= 1948 =

1948 in various calendars
- Gregorian calendar: 1948; MCMXLVIII
- Ab urbe condita: 2701
- Armenian calendar: 1397; ԹՎ ՌՅՂԷ
- Assyrian calendar: 6698
- Baháʼí calendar: 104–105
- Balinese saka calendar: 1869–1870
- Bengali calendar: 1354–1355
- Berber calendar: 2898
- British Regnal year: 12 Geo. 6 – 13 Geo. 6
- Buddhist calendar: 2492
- Burmese calendar: 1310
- Byzantine calendar: 7456–7457
- Chinese calendar: 丁亥年 (Fire Pig); 4645 or 4438 — to — 戊子年 (Earth Rat); 4646 or 4439
- Coptic calendar: 1664–1665
- Discordian calendar: 3114
- Ethiopian calendar: 1940–1941
- Hebrew calendar: 5708–5709
- Hindu calendars
- Vikram Samvat: 2004–2005
- Shaka Samvat: 1869–1870
- Kali Yuga: 5048–5049
- Holocene calendar: 11948
- Igbo calendar: 948–949
- Iranian calendar: 1326–1327
- Islamic calendar: 1367–1368
- Japanese calendar: Shōwa 23 (昭和２３年)
- Javanese calendar: 1879–1880
- Juche calendar: 37
- Julian calendar: Gregorian minus 13 days
- Korean calendar: 4281
- Minguo calendar: ROC 37 民國37年
- Nanakshahi calendar: 480
- Thai solar calendar: 2491
- Tibetan calendar: མེ་མོ་ཕག་ལོ་ (female Fire-Boar); 2074 or 1693 or 921 — to — ས་ཕོ་བྱི་བ་ལོ་ (male Earth-Rat); 2075 or 1694 or 922

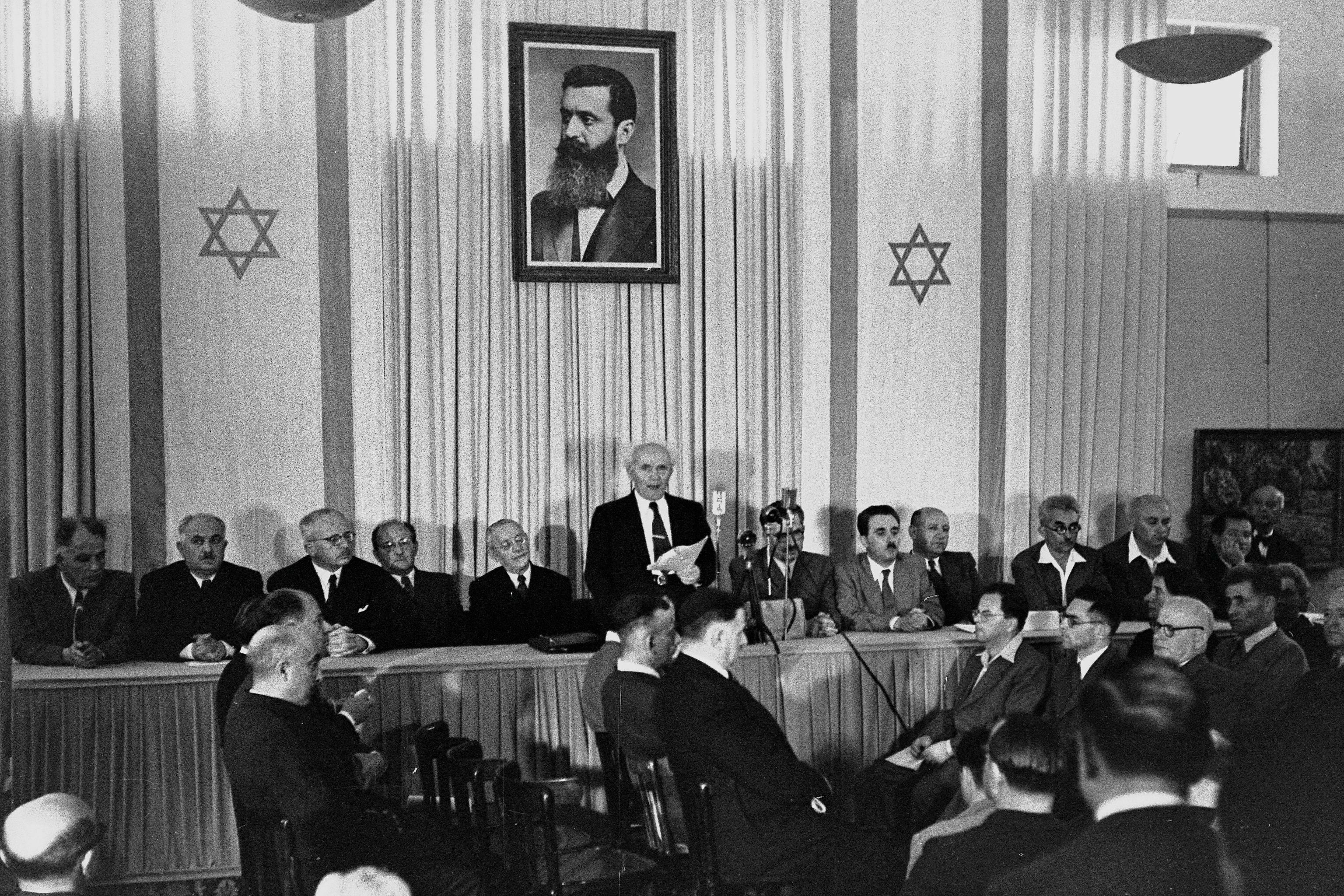
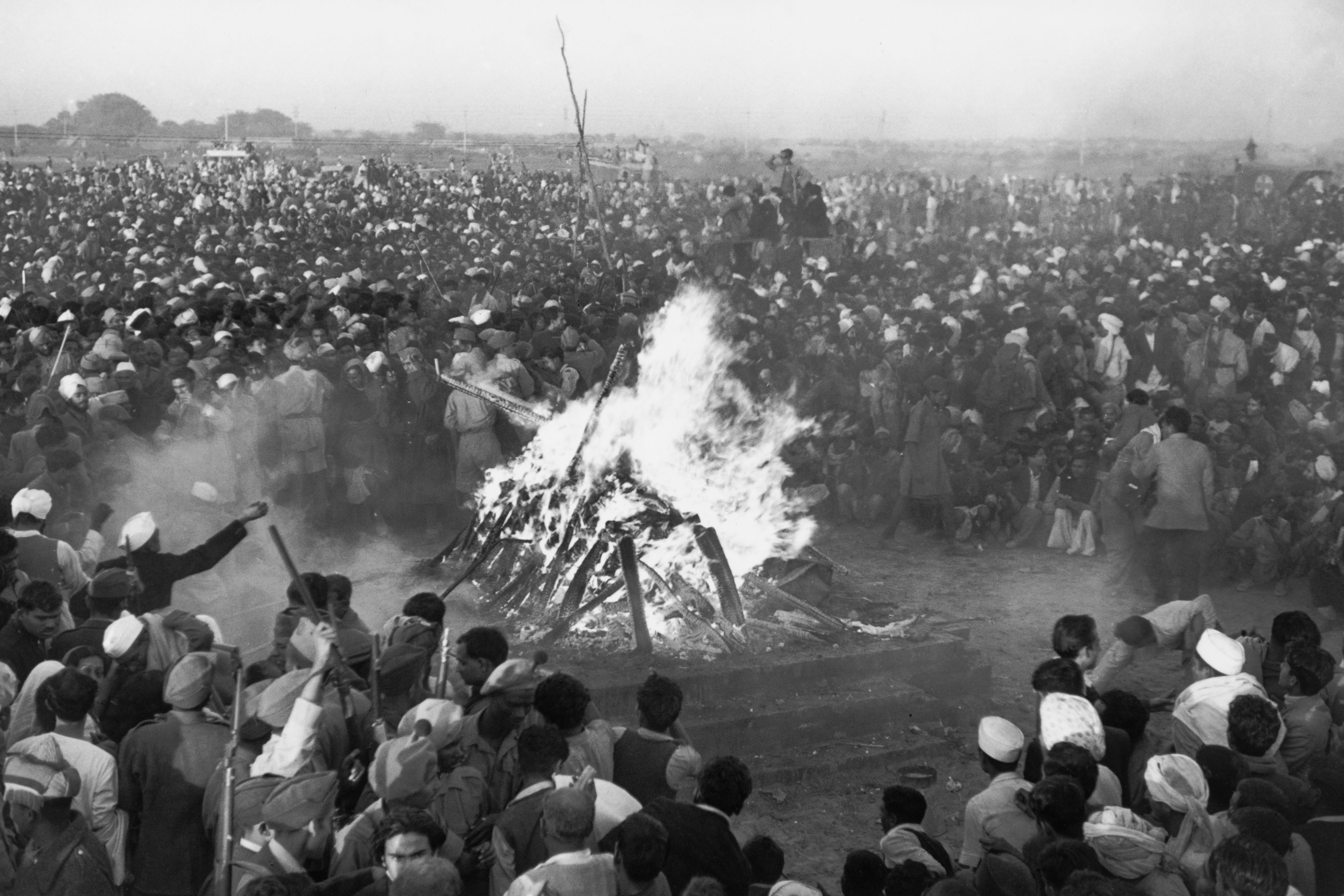
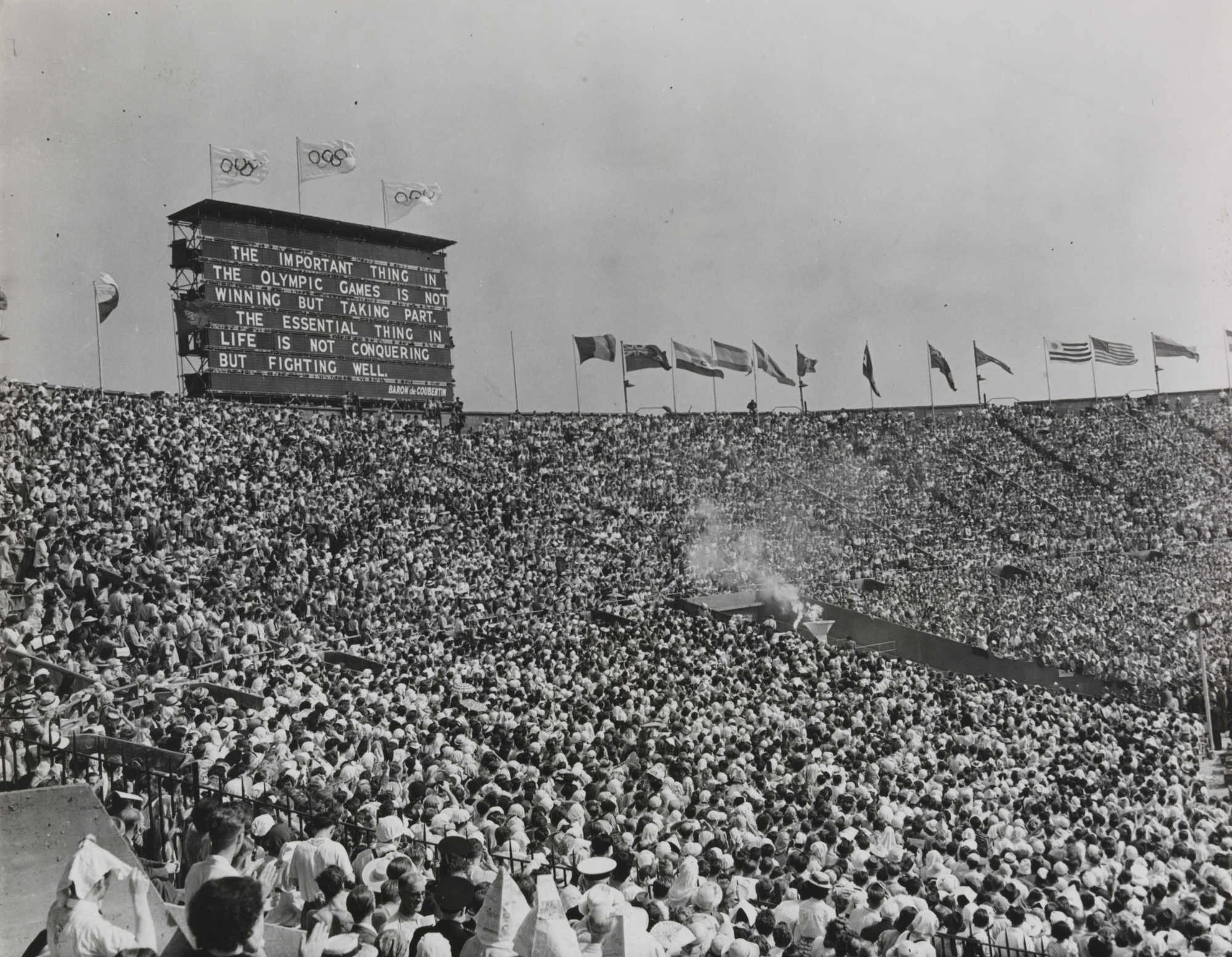
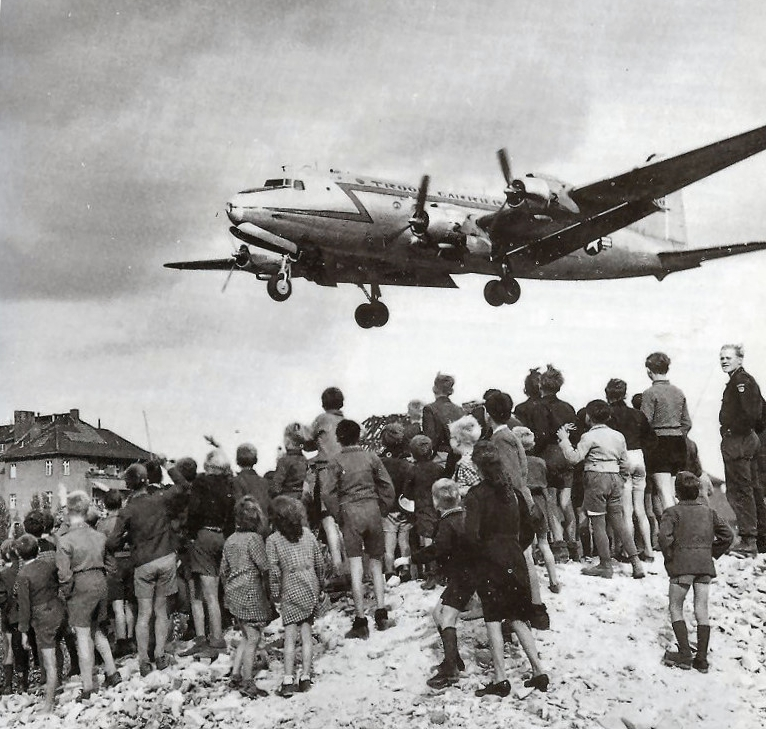
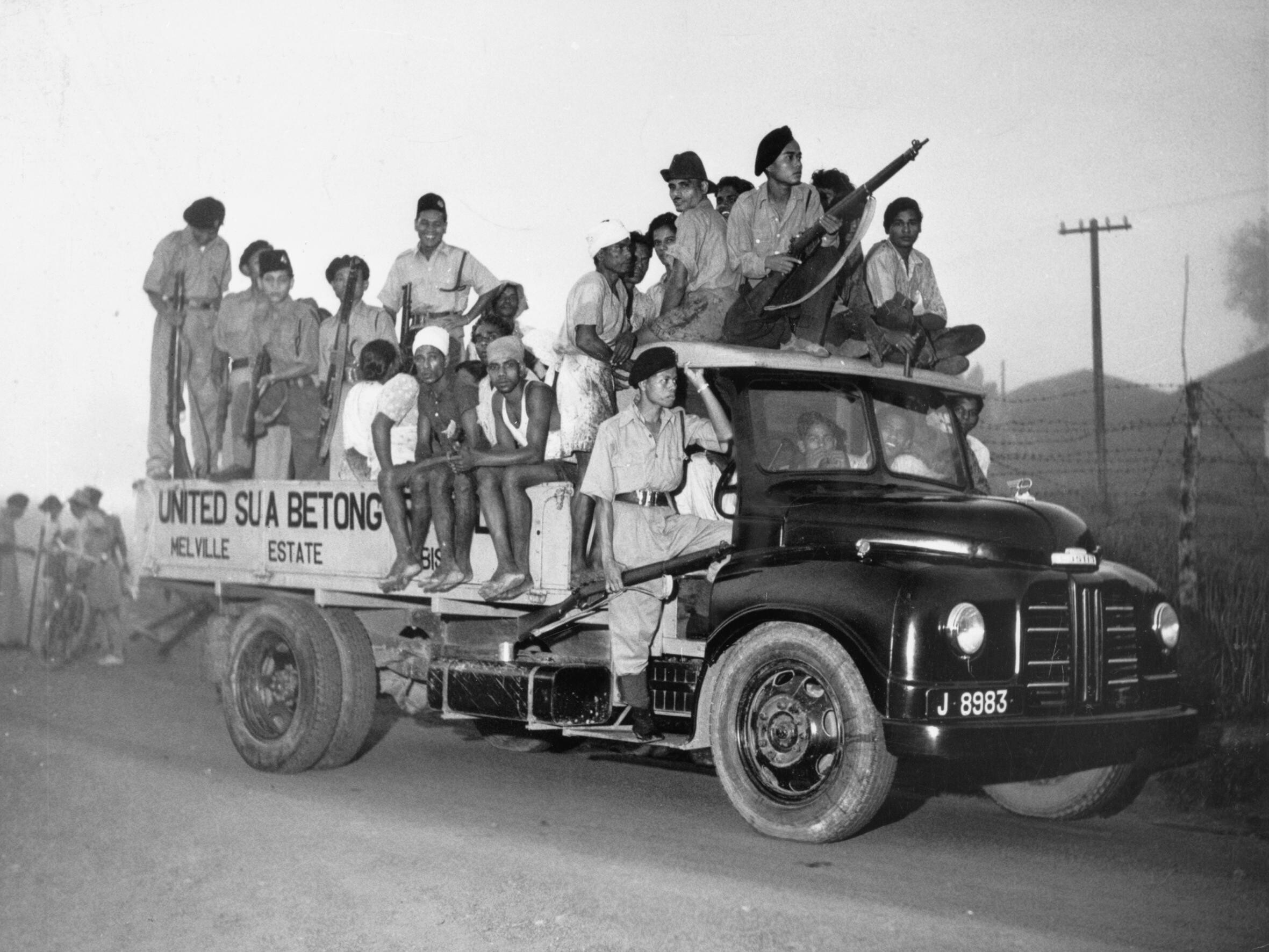
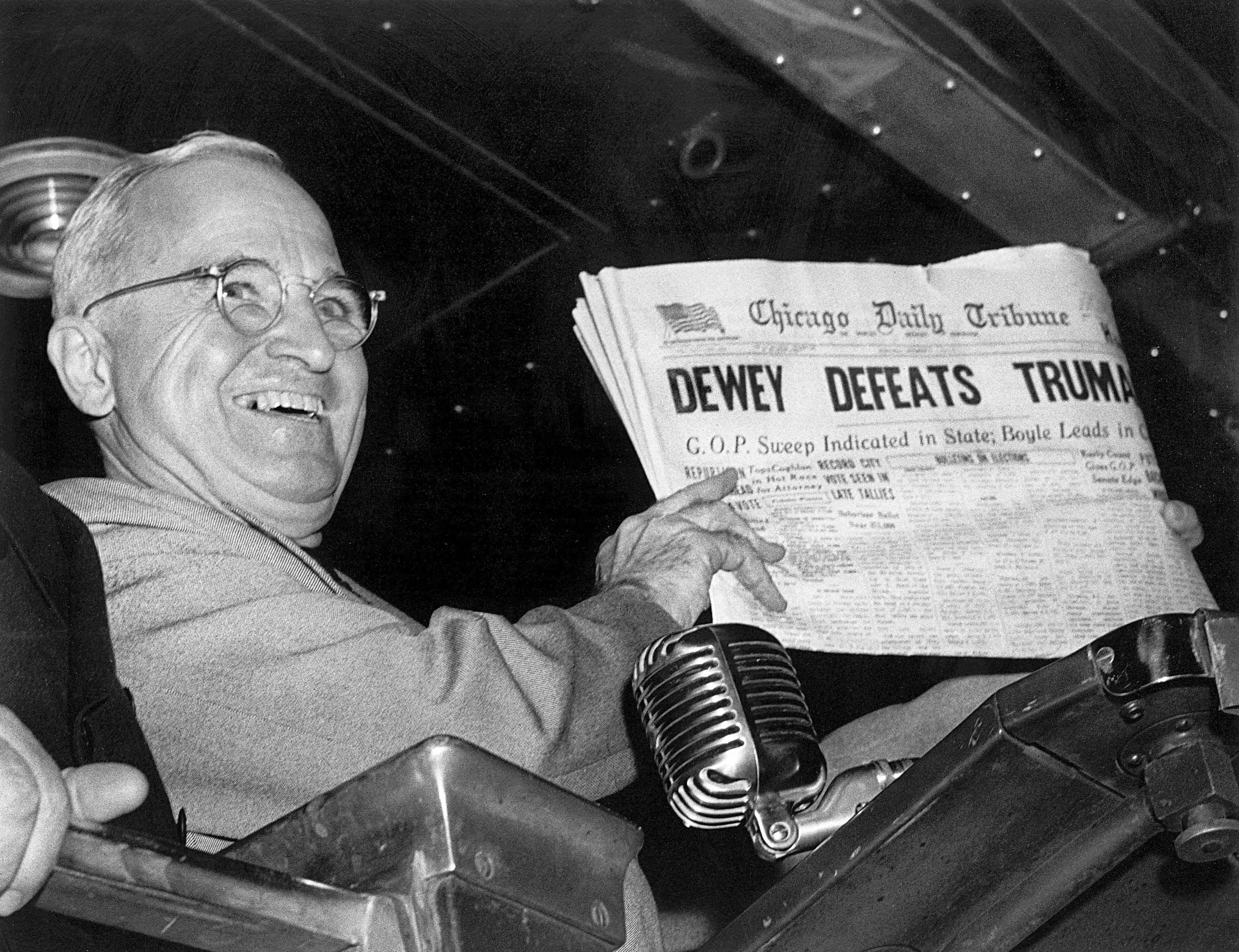
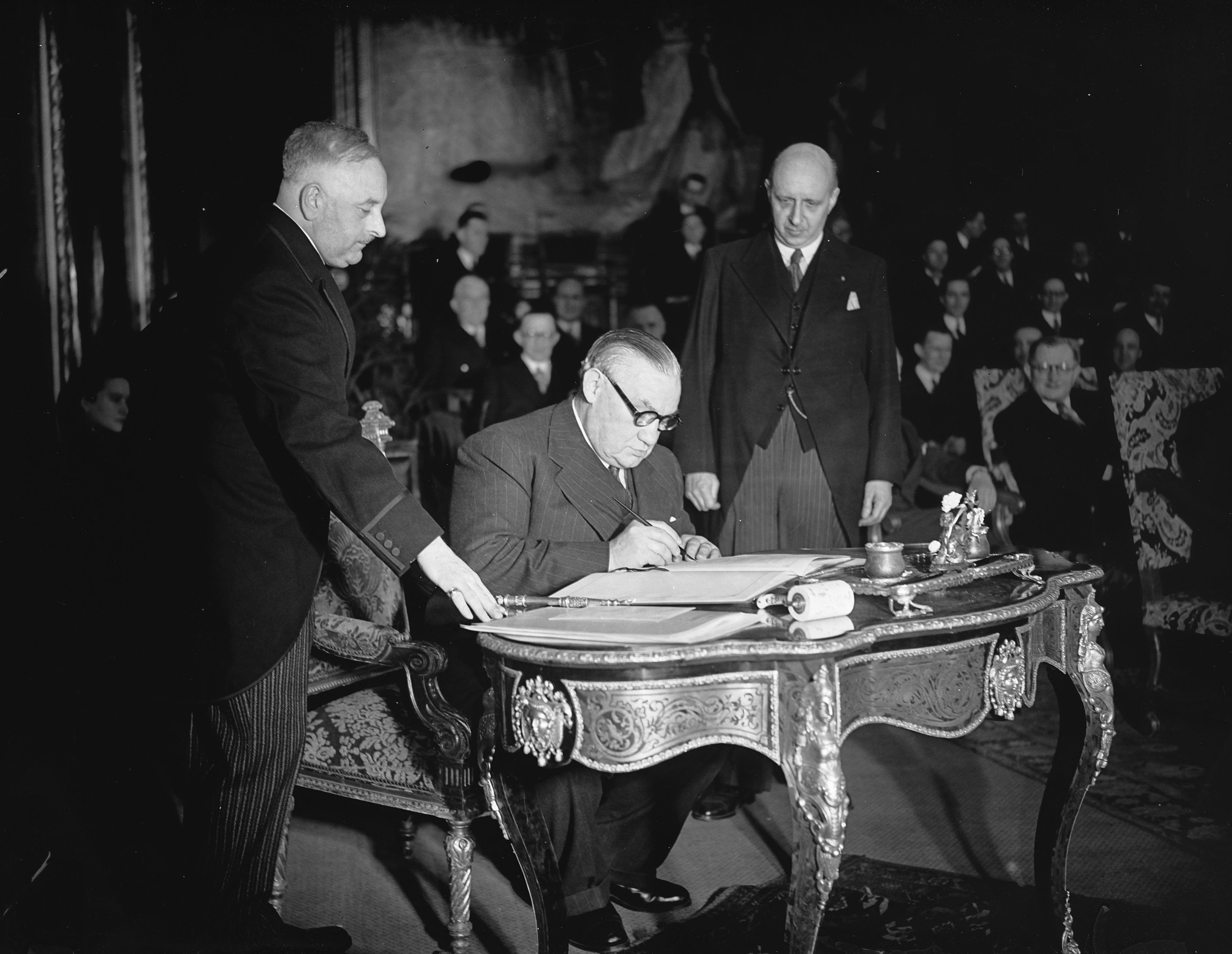
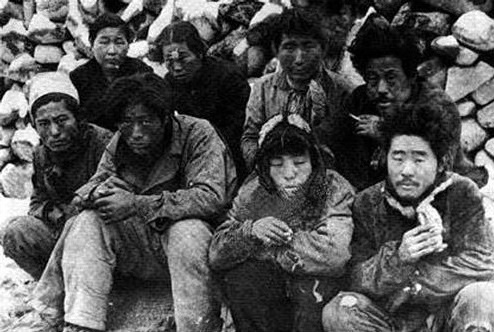
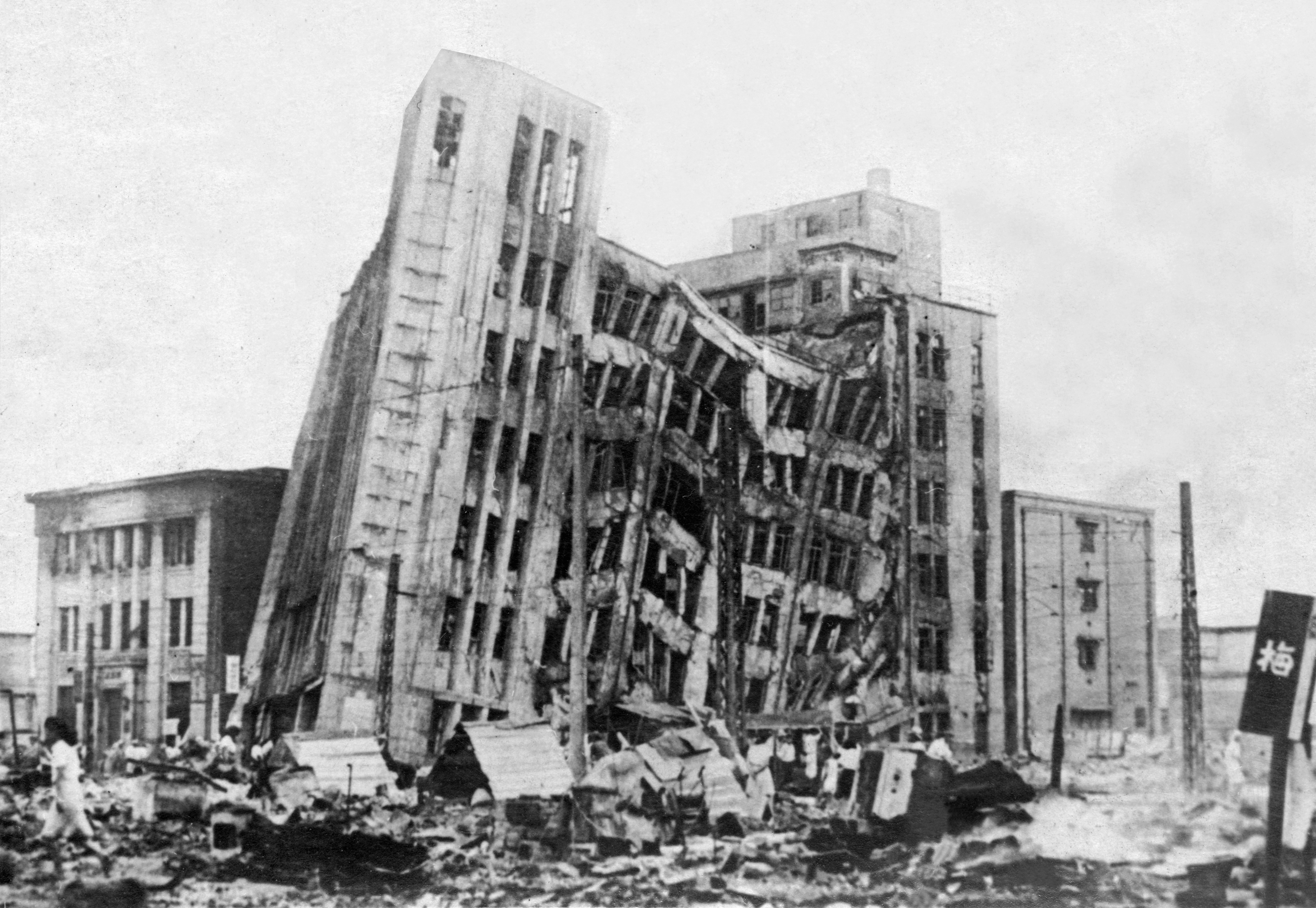
From top to bottom, left to right:
- The Israeli Declaration of Independence establishes the State of Israel, sparking the 1948 Arab–Israeli War;
- Mahatma Gandhi is assassinated in New Delhi;
- The 1948 Summer Olympics open in London, the first since World War II;
- The Berlin Blockade begins, leading to the U.S.-led Airlift;
- The Malayan Emergency erupts against British forces;
- The 1948 United States presidential election sees Harry S. Truman's surprise victory;
- The Treaty of Brussels is signed, forming a Western defense alliance;
- The Jeju uprising in South Korea is brutally suppressed;
- The 1948 Fukui earthquake devastates Japan.

1948 (MCMXLVIII) was a leap year starting on Thursday of the Gregorian calendar, the 1948th year of the Common Era (CE) and Anno Domini (AD) designations, the 948th year of the 2nd millennium, the 48th year of the 20th century, and the 9th year of the 1940s decade.

== Events ==
=== January ===
- January 1
  - The General Agreement on Tariffs and Trade (GATT) is inaugurated.
  - The current Constitutions of Italy and of New Jersey (both later subject to amendment) go into effect.
  - The railways of Britain are nationalized, to form British Railways.
- January 4 – Burma gains its independence from the United Kingdom, becoming an independent republic, named the 'Union of Burma', with Sao Shwe Thaik as its first President and U Nu its first Prime Minister.
- January 5 – In the United States:
  - Warner Brothers shows the first color newsreel (Tournament of Roses Parade and the Rose Bowl Game).
  - The first Kinsey Report, Sexual Behavior in the Human Male, is published.
- January 7 – Mantell UFO incident: Kentucky Air National Guard pilot Thomas Mantell crashes while in pursuit of an unidentified flying object.
- January 12 – Mahatma Gandhi begins his fast-unto-death in Delhi, to stop communal violence during the Partition of India.
- January 17 – A truce is declared between nationalist Indonesian and Dutch troops in Java.
- January 22 – British foreign secretary Ernest Bevin proposes the formation of a Western Union between Britain, France and the Benelux countries to stand up against the Soviet Union. The Treaty of Brussels is signed March 17 as a consequence, a predecessor to NATO.
- January 26 – Teigin poison case: a man masquerading as a doctor poisons 12 of 16 bank employees of the Tokyo branch of Imperial Bank and takes the money; artist Sadamichi Hirasawa is later sentenced to death for the crime, but is never executed.
- January 29 – A DC-3 aircraft crash at Los Gatos Creek, near Coalinga, California, kills 4 US citizens and 28 deportees, commemorated in a protest song ("Deportee (Plane Wreck at Los Gatos)") by Woody Guthrie.
- January 30
  - Assassination of Mahatma Gandhi: Indian pacifist and leader Mahatma Gandhi is shot by Nathuram Godse in New Delhi.
  - The 1948 Winter Olympics open in St Moritz, Switzerland.
- January 31 – The British crown colony of the Malayan Union, Penang and Malacca form the Federation of Malaya.

=== February ===
- February 1
  - The Soviet Union begins to jam Voice of America broadcasts.
  - The Federation of Malaya is proclaimed.
- February 4 – Ceylon (later known as Sri Lanka) becomes an independent country, within the British Commonwealth adopting King George VI as the King of Ceylon.
- February 11 – General Douglas Gracey becomes Commander-in-chief of Pakistan Army.
- February 16 – Miranda, innermost of the large moons of Uranus, is discovered by Gerard Kuiper.
- February 18 – Éamon de Valera, Irish head of government from 1918 to 1932, loses power to an opposition coalition. John A. Costello is appointed Taoiseach by President Seán T. O'Kelly, until 1960.
- February 19 – The Conference of Youth and Students of Southeast Asia Fighting for Freedom and Independence convenes in Calcutta.
- February 21 – The United States stock car racing organization NASCAR is founded by Bill France Sr. with other drivers.
- February 22 – The first of the Ben Yehuda Street bombings in Jerusalem kills between 49 and 58 civilians and injures between 140 and 200.
- February 25 – 1948 Czechoslovak coup d'état: Edvard Beneš, President of Czechoslovakia, cedes control of the country to the Communist Party, a day celebrated by that regime as "Victorious February" (Czech: Vítězný únor; Slovak: Víťazný Február) until November 1989.
- February 28
  - Accra Riots: Riots take place in Accra, capital of the British colony of Gold Coast, when a peaceful protest march by ex-servicemen is broken up by police, leaving several members of the group dead, among them Sergeant Adjetey, one of the leaders.
  - The 2nd Congress of the Communist Party of India convenes in Calcutta.

=== March ===
- March 8 – McCollum v. Board of Education: The United States Supreme Court rules that religious instruction in public schools violates the U.S. Constitution.
- March 12 – The Costa Rican Civil War begins.
- March 17
  - The Treaty of Brussels is signed by Belgium, France, Luxembourg, the Netherlands and the United Kingdom, providing for economic, social and cultural collaboration and collective self-defence.
  - The Hells Angels motorcycle gang is founded in California.
- March 18 – The Round Table Conference convenes in The Hague, Netherlands, to prepare the decolonization process for the Caribbean island of Aruba and the other Dutch Colonies. Aruba presents the mandate of the Aruban People for Aruba to become an independent country, under the sovereignty of the House of Orange, based on Aruba's first state constitution presented officially since August 1947, and a (4th) member state of the future Dutch Commonwealth.
- March 20
  - Singapore holds its first elections.
  - Renowned Italian conductor Arturo Toscanini makes his television debut, conducting the NBC Symphony Orchestra in an all-Wagner program in the United States.
  - The 20th Academy Awards Ceremony is held in Los Angeles. Gentleman's Agreement wins the Academy Award for Best Picture.
- March 25 – The United States Proposal for Temporary United Nations Trusteeship for Palestine is announced by Harry S. Truman.

=== April ===
- April – Children's Bargain Town, a predecessor of toy and child-related retailer Toys "R" Us, is founded in Washington, D.C., United States.
- April 1 – Physicists Ralph Asher Alpher and George Gamow publish the Alpher–Bethe–Gamow paper, about the Big Bang.
- April 3
  - United States President Harry S. Truman signs the Marshall Plan, which authorizes $5 billion in aid for 16 countries.
  - Jeju Uprising: Residents revolt on Jeju Island, South Korea, eventually leading to the deaths of between 14,000 and 30,000.
  - Beethoven's Symphony No. 9 is played on television in its entirety for the first time, in a series of concerts featuring Arturo Toscanini conducting the NBC Symphony Orchestra in the United States. The chorus is conducted by Robert Shaw.
- April 5 – 1947–48 Civil War in Mandatory Palestine: Haganah launches Operation Nachshon, provoking the 1948 Palestinian expulsion and flight.
- April 6 – The Finno-Soviet Treaty is signed in Moscow.
- April 7– The World Health Organization is established by the United Nations.
- April 9
  - Liberal politician Jorge Eliécer Gaitán's assassination provokes a violent riot in Bogotá (the Bogotazo) and a further 10 years of violence (La Violencia) across Colombia.
  - The Deir Yassin massacre takes place in British Mandatory Palestine.
- April 13 – The Hadassah medical convoy massacre takes place, in British Mandatory Palestine.
- April 15 – Pan American World Airways flight 1-10 crashes on approach to Shannon Airport in Ireland, killing all but one of the thirty-one passengers and crew.
- April 16 – The Organisation for Economic Co-operation and Development is founded, as the Organisation for European Economic Co-operation (OEEC).
- April 18 – Italian general election, 1948: The first democratic general election with universal suffrage is held in Italy. The Christian Democracy party achieves a majority over the Popular Democratic Front Communist-Socialist coalition.
- April 19
  - Burma joins the United Nations.
  - The American Broadcasting Company (otherwise known as ABC) begins television services, on WFIL-TV in Philadelphia (later WPVI-TV).
- April 22
  - Civil War in Mandatory Palestine: Battle of Haifa – Jewish paramilitary group Haganah captures Haifa from the Arab Liberation Army.
  - WTVR begins television services. WTVR is the first TV station south of Washington D.C., giving it the nickname "The South's First Television station".
- April 23 – First National Games of Pakistan held in Karachi.
- April 24 – The Costa Rican Civil War ends.
- April 30
  - The Organization of American States (OAS) is founded.
  - The English-built Land Rover is unveiled at the Amsterdam Motor Show.

=== May ===
- May – The RAND Corporation is established, as an independent nonprofit policy research and analysis institution, in the United States.
- May 9 – Solar eclipse of May 9, 1948: An annular solar eclipse is visible in Japan and South Korea, and is the 32nd solar eclipse of Solar Saros 137. This eclipse is very short, lasting just 0.3 seconds. The path width is just about 200 meters wide (approximately 218 yards).
- May 11 – Luigi Einaudi becomes President of the Italian Republic.

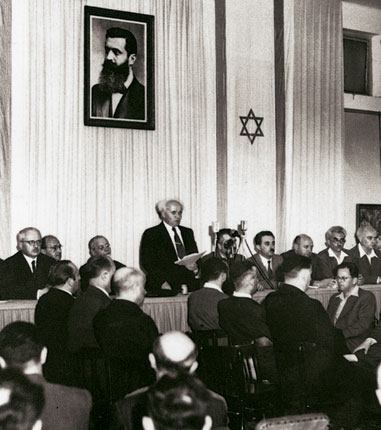
Israeli Declaration of Independence, 1948

- May 14 – The Israeli Declaration of Independence is made. David Ben-Gurion becomes the first prime minister, a provisional position that will become formalized on February 14, 1949.
- May 15
  - 1948 Arab–Israeli War: The British Mandate of Palestine is officially terminated; expeditionary forces from Egypt, Transjordan, Syria and Iraq invade Israel and clash with Israeli forces after declaring war.
  - The murder of June Anne Devaney a 3-year-old girl in Blackburn, England. To solve the crime, officers take 46,253 sets of fingerprints before identifying her murderer.
  - Australian cricket team in England in 1948: The touring Australians set an all-time first-class record, by scoring 721 runs in a day against Essex.
- May 16
  - Chaim Weizmann is elected as the first President of Israel
  - New York City Fire Department Rescue 5 is founded for Staten Island.
- May 18 – The first Legislative Yuan of the Republic of China officially convenes in Nanjing.
- May 22 – The Soviets launch Operation Vesna, the largest Lithuanian deportation to Siberia.
- May 25 – The United Church of Christ in the Philippines (UCCP) is founded at Ellinwood Malate Church in Manila.
- May 26 – The United States Congress passes Public Law 557 which permanently establishes the Civil Air Patrol as the auxiliary of the United States Air Force.
- May 28 – Daniel François Malan defeats Jan Smuts and becomes Prime Minister of South Africa, which starts the era of apartheid (which is finally dismantled by F. W. de Klerk in 1994).
- May 29 – The Casimir effect is predicted by Dutch physicist Hendrik Casimir.
- May 30 – A dike along the Columbia River breaks, obliterating Vanport, Oregon, within minutes; 15 people die and tens of thousands are left homeless.

=== June ===
- June 1 – Puma, a global sports goods brand, is founded in Bavaria, West Germany, by Rudolf Dassler, having split from his brother "Adi".
- June 3 – The Palomar Observatory telescope is finished in California.
- June 10 – Hasan Saka forms the new government of Turkey. (17th government; Hasan Saka had served twice as a prime minister)
- June 11 – The first monkey astronaut, Albert I, is launched into space from White Sands, New Mexico.
- June 15 – Chinese newspaper Renmin Ribao (People's Daily) is first published in Pingshan County, Hebei.
- June 17 – United Airlines Flight 624, a Douglas DC-6, crashes near Mount Carmel, Pennsylvania, killing 43 and injuring 84 people on board.
- June 18
  - Malayan Emergency: A state of emergency is declared in the Federation of Malaya, due to a communist insurgency.
  - Columbia Records introduces its 33 1/3 rpm long playing phonograph format.
- June 20 – The U.S. Congress recesses for the remainder of 1948, after an overtime session closes at 7:00 a.m. (to be shortly interrupted by Truman's recall from Congressional recess for July 20, 1948).
- June 21
  - The Deutsche Mark becomes the official currency of the future Federal Republic of Germany.
  - The Manchester Baby in England becomes the first stored-program computer to successfully execute a program.
- June 22
  - The ship HMT Empire Windrush brings more than 800 Afro-Caribbean immigrants to Tilbury near London, the start of a large wave of immigration to Britain.
  - David Lean's Oliver Twist, based on Charles Dickens's famous novel, premieres in the UK. It is banned for 3 years in the U.S., because of alleged antisemitism in depicting master criminal Fagin, played by Alec Guinness.

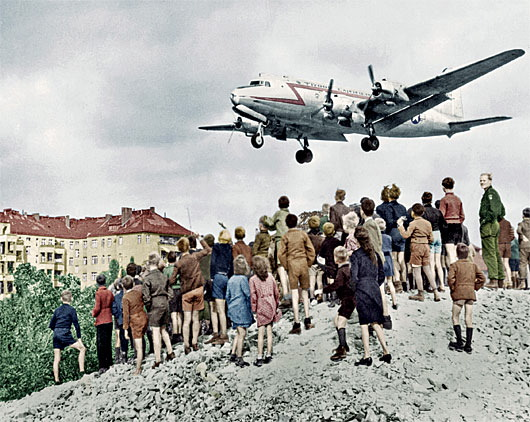
A C-54 Skymaster landing at Berlin Tempelhof Airport

- June 24
  - Cold War: The Berlin Blockade begins.
  - The first World Health Assembly of the World Health Organization is held in Geneva.
- June 26
  - William Shockley files the original patent for the grown-junction transistor, the first bipolar junction transistor.
  - The Berlin Airlift begins.
- June 28
  - The Cominform Resolution marks the beginning of the Informbiro period in Yugoslavia and the Soviet/Yugoslav split.
  - The 6.8 M_{w} Fukui earthquake strikes Fukui, Japan; 3,769 are killed, 22,203 injured.
  - Lotte Group, a global conglomerate in Northeast Asia (South Korea and Japan), is founded.

=== July ===
- July 5 – The National Health Service in the United Kingdom begins functioning, giving the right to universal healthcare, free at point of use.
- July 6 – The world's first Air Car-ferry service is flown by a Bristol Freighter of Silver City Airways, from Lympne to Le Touquet across the English Channel.
- July 13 – The Coptic Orthodox Church of Alexandria and Ethiopian Orthodox Tewahedo Churches reach an agreement, leading to the promotion of the Ethiopian church to the rank of an autocephalous Patriarchate. Five bishops are immediately consecrated by the Patriarch of Alexandria and the successor to Abuna Qerellos IV is granted the power to consecrate new bishops, who are empowered to elect a new Patriarch for their church.
- July 14 – The attempted assassination of Palmiro Togliatti, general secretary of the Italian Communist Party, results in numerous strikes all over the country.
- July 15 – The first London chapter of Alcoholics Anonymous is founded.
- July 16 – Three armed men hijack the Cathay Pacific passenger plane Miss Macao and shoot the pilot; the plane crashes, killing 26 of 27 people on board.
- July 20 – Cold War:
  - President Harry S. Truman issues the second peacetime military draft in the United States, amid increasing tensions with the Soviet Union (the first peacetime draft occurred in 1940 under President Roosevelt)
  - Eugene Dennis, William Z. Foster and ten other Communist Party USA leaders are arrested and charged under the Alien Registration Act.
- July 22 – The Dominion of Newfoundland votes to join Canada, after a referendum.
- July 26 – U.S. President Truman signs Executive Order 9981, ending racial segregation in the United States Armed Forces.
- July 28 – Around 200 die in an explosion at a chemical plant in Ludwigshafen, Germany.
- July 29 – The 1948 Summer Olympics begin in London, the first since the 1936 Summer Olympics in Berlin.
- July 31
  - At Idlewild Field in New York, New York International Airport (later renamed John F. Kennedy International Airport) is dedicated.
  - American defector Elizabeth Bentley, previously working on behalf of the Soviet Union, appears under subpoena before the House Un-American Activities Committee (HUAC) of the United States House of Representatives regarding Communist espionage; she implicates Whittaker Chambers.
- July–October – Claude E. Shannon publishes "A Mathematical Theory of Communication" in Bell System Technical Journal (US), regarded as a foundation of information theory and all modern digital communications, which also leads to the adoption of the term bit.

=== August ===
- August 3 – Whittaker Chambers appears under subpoena before the HUAC and alleges that several former U.S. Federal officials were communists, including Harry Dexter White and Alger Hiss.
- August 5 – Alger Hiss appears before the HUAC, to deny the allegations of Whittaker Chambers.
- August 10–23 – The Herrenchiemsee convention prepares the draft for the Basic Law for the Federal Republic of Germany.
- August 12 – Babrra massacre: About 600 unarmed members of the Khudai Khidmatgar movement are shot dead on the orders of the Chief Minister of the North-West Frontier Province, Abdul Qayyum Khan Kashmiri, on Babrra ground in the Hashtnagar region of Charsadda District, North-West Frontier Province (modern-day Khyber Pakhtunkhwa), Pakistan.
- August 13 – Harry Dexter White and Donald Hiss refute allegations of Communism by Whittaker Chambers, before the HUAC.
- August 14 – 1948 Ashes series: Australian batsman Don Bradman, playing his last Test cricket match, against England at The Oval, is bowled by Eric Hollies for a duck (leaving his career Test batting average at 99.94); however, "The Invincibles" win the match by an innings and 149 runs, and The Ashes 4–0.
- August 14 – Beaver drop, an Idaho Department of Fish and Game program to relocate beavers from Northwestern Idaho to the Chamberlain Basin in Central Idaho. The program involves parachuting beavers into the Chamberlain Basin.
- August 15 – The southern half of Korea is established as the Republic of Korea (South Korea).
- August 17 – The HUAC holds a private session between Alger Hiss and Whittaker Chambers.
- August 18 – The Danube Commission is created by the Belgrade Convention (enters into force 11 May 1949).
- August 19 – Toho strikes: A sitdown strike at Toho film studio in Tokyo ends after the studio is surrounded by 2,000 police and a platoon of U.S. Eighth Army soldiers.
- August 20 – Lee Pressman, Nathan Witt and John Abt, represented by Harold I. Cammer, plead the Fifth Amendment, in response to allegations of Communism by Whittaker Chambers before the HUAC.
- August 23 – The World Council of Churches is established in Amsterdam, the Netherlands.
- August 24 – The first meeting of the charter members of the American Chamber of Commerce in Japan (ACCJ) is held.
- August 25 – The HUAC holds its first-ever televised congressional hearing, featuring "Confrontation Day" between Whittaker Chambers and Alger Hiss.
- August 27 – Whittaker Chambers states that Alger Hiss was a communist on Meet the Press radio.

=== September ===
- September 4 – Queen Wilhelmina of the Netherlands abdicates for health reasons.
- September 5 – Robert Schuman becomes Prime Minister of France.
- September 6 – Juliana is formally inaugurated to succeed her mother as queen regnant of the Netherlands.
- September 9 – The northern half of Korea is formally declared the Democratic People's Republic of Korea (North Korea), with Kim Il Sung as prime minister.
- September 11 – Muhammad Ali Jinnah, founder and first Governor-General of Pakistan, dies. Pakistan is in a state of shock as it mourns the departure of the father of the nation. The day is a public holiday nationwide.
- September 13–18 – Indian annexation of Hyderabad ("Operation Polo"): The princely state of Hyderabad is invaded by the Indian Armed Forces in a "police action", in the aftermath of Pakistani leader Jinnah's death. The Nizam of Hyderabad surrenders his state, which is amalgamated into the newly independent Dominion of India; thousands are killed as a result of this event.
- September 13 – Margaret Chase Smith of Maine is elected United States Senator, becoming the first woman to serve in both the U.S. House of Representatives and the United States Senate.
- September 17 – Lehi members, also known as the Stern Gang, assassinate Swedish count Folke Bernadotte, United Nations Mediator in Palestine, in Jerusalem.
- September 18 – An inaugural motor race is held at Goodwood Circuit, West Sussex, England.
- September 20 – The city of Rabwah is established in Pakistan.
- September 27 – Alger Hiss files a slander suit against Whittaker Chambers, for his August 27 radio statement in the United States.
- September 29 – Laurence Olivier's film of Hamlet opens in the U.S.

=== October ===
- October 5 – The International Union for the Protection of Nature (later known as the International Union for Conservation of Nature, IUCN) is established in Fontainebleau, France.
- October 6 – 1948 Ashgabat earthquake: A 7.3 M_{s} earthquake near Ashgabat, Soviet Turkmenistan kills 10,000–110,000.
- October 10 – The R-1 missile on test becomes the first Soviet launch to enter space.
- October 16 – The 57th Street Art Fair in Chicago, the oldest juried art fair in the American Midwest, is founded.
- October 19 – Presidents North Carolina Gave the Nation, a monument honoring three presidents of the United States, was dedicated at the North Carolina State Capitol in Raleigh, North Carolina.
- October 20 – Brandeis University is formally founded in Massachusetts.
- October 26 – Donora Smog of 1948: A killer smog settles into Donora, Pennsylvania.
- October 29 – 1948 Arab–Israeli War: Massacres of Palestinian Arab villagers by the Israel Defense Forces:
  - Al-Dawayima massacre: Between 30 and 145 are killed.
  - Safsaf massacre: At least 52 are killed.
- October 30 – Gozo luzzu disaster: A luzzu fishing boat overloaded with passengers capsizes and sinks in the Gozo Channel off Qala, Gozo, Malta, killing 23 of the 27 people on board.

=== November ===
- November 1
  - The Foley Square trial of Eugene Dennis and ten other CPUSA leaders begins, in New York City.
  - Athenagoras I is elected the 268th Ecumenical Patriarch of Constantinople.
  - A boiler and ammunition explosion aboard merchant ship Xuan Huai evacuating troops of the Republic of China Army from Yingkou, China for Taiwan causes thousands of deaths.

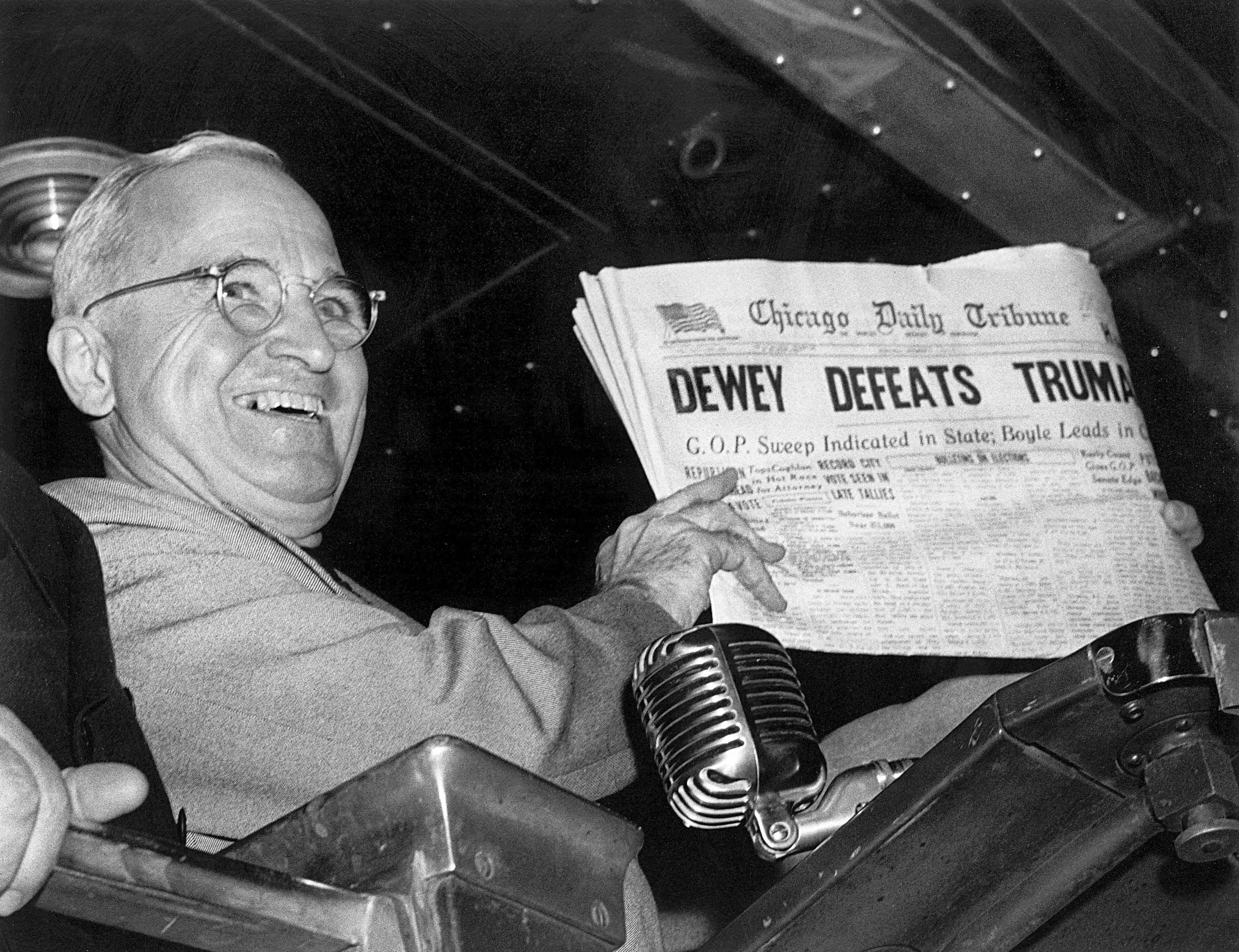
Truman holds up an erroneous banner headline of the Chicago Daily Tribune.

- November 2 – 1948 United States presidential election: Democratic incumbent Harry S. Truman defeats Republican Thomas E. Dewey, "Dixiecrat" Strom Thurmond and Progressive party candidate Henry A. Wallace.
- November 12 – In Tokyo, an international war crimes tribunal sentences seven Japanese military and government officials to death, including General Hideki Tojo, for their roles in World War II.
- November 15 – Louis Stephen St. Laurent becomes Canada's 12th prime minister.
- November 16
  - Operation Magic Carpet to transport Jews from Yemen to Israel begins.
  - The University of the Andes (Universidad de los Andes) is founded in Bogotá, Colombia.
- November 17
  - Mohammad Reza Shah Pahlavi divorces his second wife, the former Princess Fawzia of Egypt.
  - Whittaker Chambers produces secret government papers, handwritten and typewritten by Alger Hiss, during pretrial examination.
- November 20 – Geoffrey B. Orbell rediscovers the Takahē, last seen 50 years previously, near Lake Te Anau, New Zealand.
- November 24 – In Venezuela, president Rómulo Gallegos is ousted by a military junta.
- November 27 – The Calgary Stampeders defeat the Ottawa Rough Riders 12–7 before 20,013 fans at Toronto's Varsity Stadium, to win their first Grey Cup and complete the only perfect season to date in Canadian football.

=== December ===
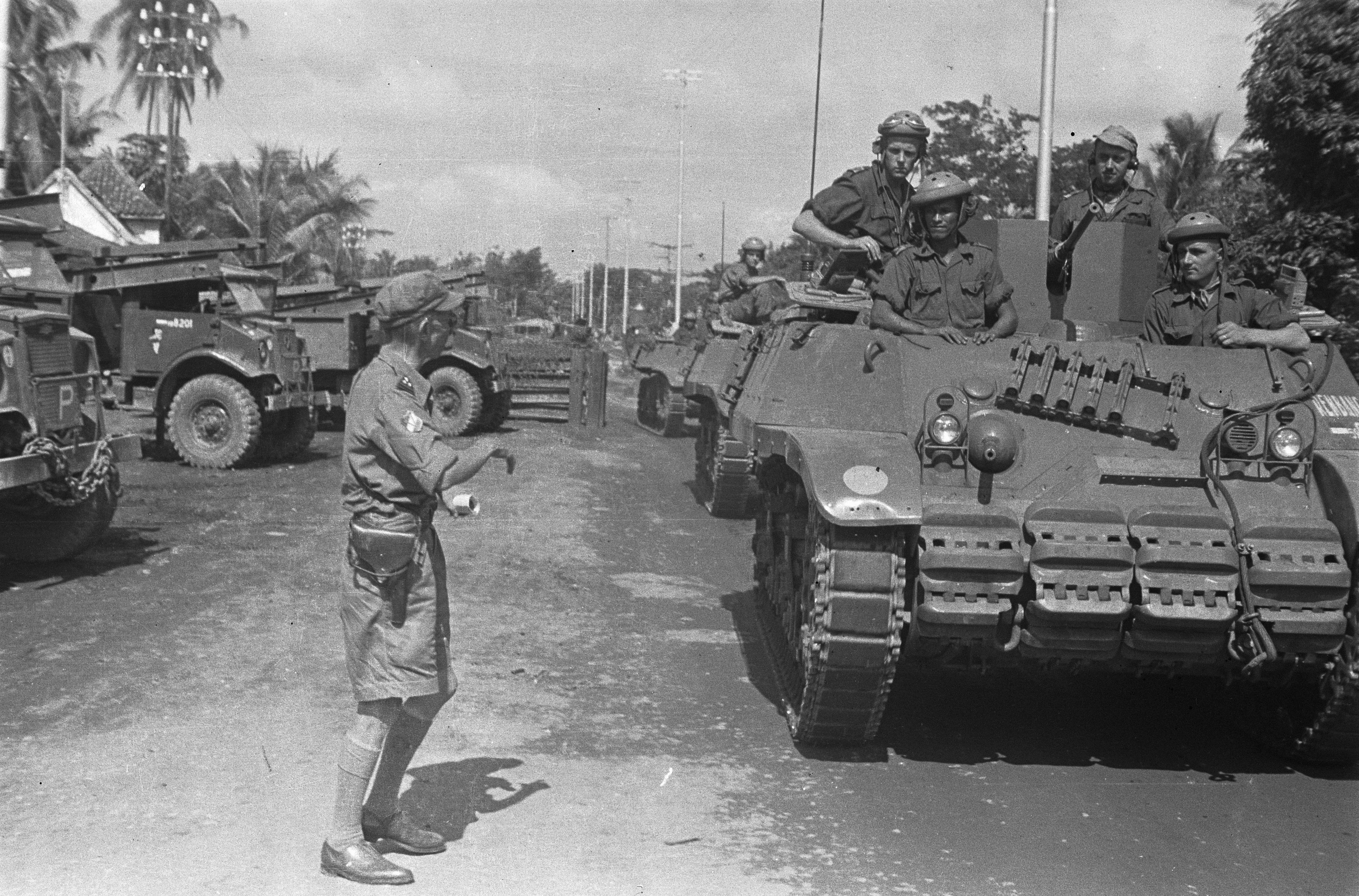
Dutch forces in the Dutch East Indies, 1948

- December 1 – José Figueres Ferrer abolishes the army in Costa Rica, making it the first country in history to do so.
- December 2 – The United States House Un-American Activities Committee subpoenas and retrieves the "Pumpkin Papers" from the farm of Whittaker Chambers.
- December 4 – Chinese liner SS Kiangya sinks after an explosion occurs at the stern, which is thought to have been caused by a Japanese mine from World War 2, killing up to 3920 people.
- December 6 – Richard Nixon displays microfilm from the "Pumpkin Papers" to the press.
- December 9 – The United Nations General Assembly adopts the Genocide Convention.
- December 10 – The United Nations General Assembly adopts the Universal Declaration of Human Rights.
- December 11–12 – Malayan Emergency: Batang Kali massacre: Scots Guards shoot 24 Chinese villagers in Malaya.
- December 15 – The United States Department of Justice indicts Alger Hiss, on two counts of perjury.
- December 17 – The Finnish Security Police is established to remove communist leadership from its predecessor, the State Police.
- December 19 – In the American National Football League, the Philadelphia Eagles defeat the Chicago Cardinals 7–0, to win the championship.
- December 20
  - Indonesian National Revolution: The Dutch military captures Yogyakarta, the temporary capital of the newly formed Republic of Indonesia.
  - American economist and former State Department official and spy for the Soviet Union Laurence Duggan falls to his death, from the 16th story window of his Manhattan office.
- December 23 – Seven Japanese military and political leaders, convicted of war crimes by the International Military Tribunal for the Far East, are executed by Allied occupation authorities, at Sugamo Prison in Tokyo, Japan.
- December 26
  - The last Soviet troops withdraw from North Korea.
  - Cardinal József Mindszenty is arrested in Hungary and accused of treason and conspiracy.
- December 28 – A Muslim Brotherhood member assassinates Egyptian Prime Minister Mahmud Fahmi Nokrashi.
- December 30 – The musical Kiss Me, Kate opens for the first of 1,077 performances in New York City.
- December 31 – Arab-Israeli War: Israeli troops drive Egyptians from the Negev.

=== Date unknown ===
- The Fresh Kills Landfill, the world's largest, opens on Staten Island, New York.
- The Slovak city Gúta is renamed Kolárovo.
- The Vielha Tunnel is opened, giving access to the Val d'Aran in the Spanish Pyrenees; at this time it is the longest road tunnel in the world.
- The Oakridge Transit Centre opens in Vancouver, British Columbia.
- The last recorded sighting is made of the Caspian tiger, in Kazakh SSR.
- A pack of wolves kills about 40 children in Darovskoy District, in Russia.
- The last edition of the Index Librorum Prohibitorum is published in the Vatican.
- Charles Warrell creates the first I-Spy books in the United Kingdom.
- Rev. W. Awdry's third book, James the Red Engine, is published in the United Kingdom.
- Inspired by World War II fighter planes, Cadillac introduces the first automobile to sport tailfins.
- The inaugural 6 Hours of Watkins Glen sports car endurance race is held in the United States.

== Births ==
=== January ===
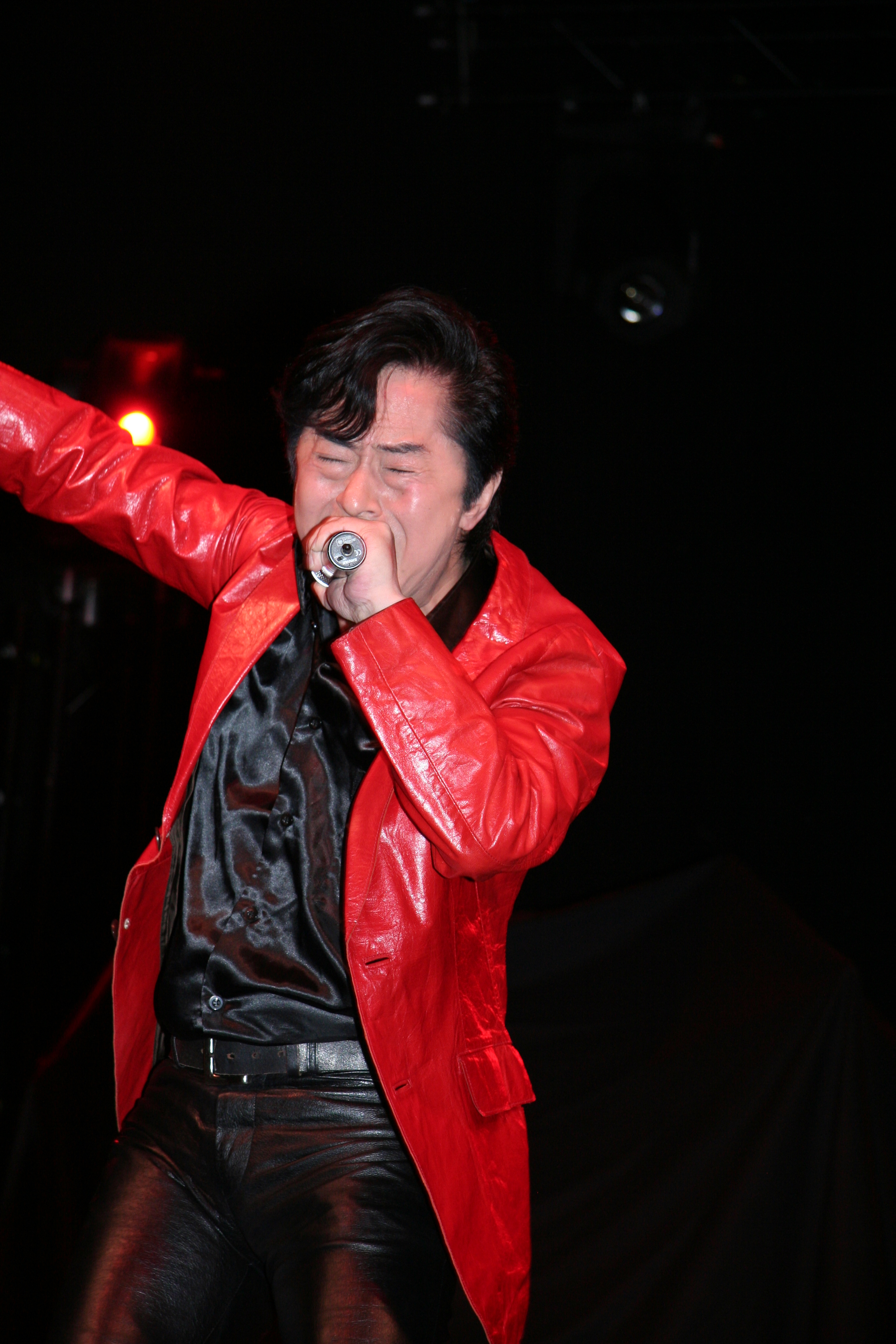
Ichirou Mizuki

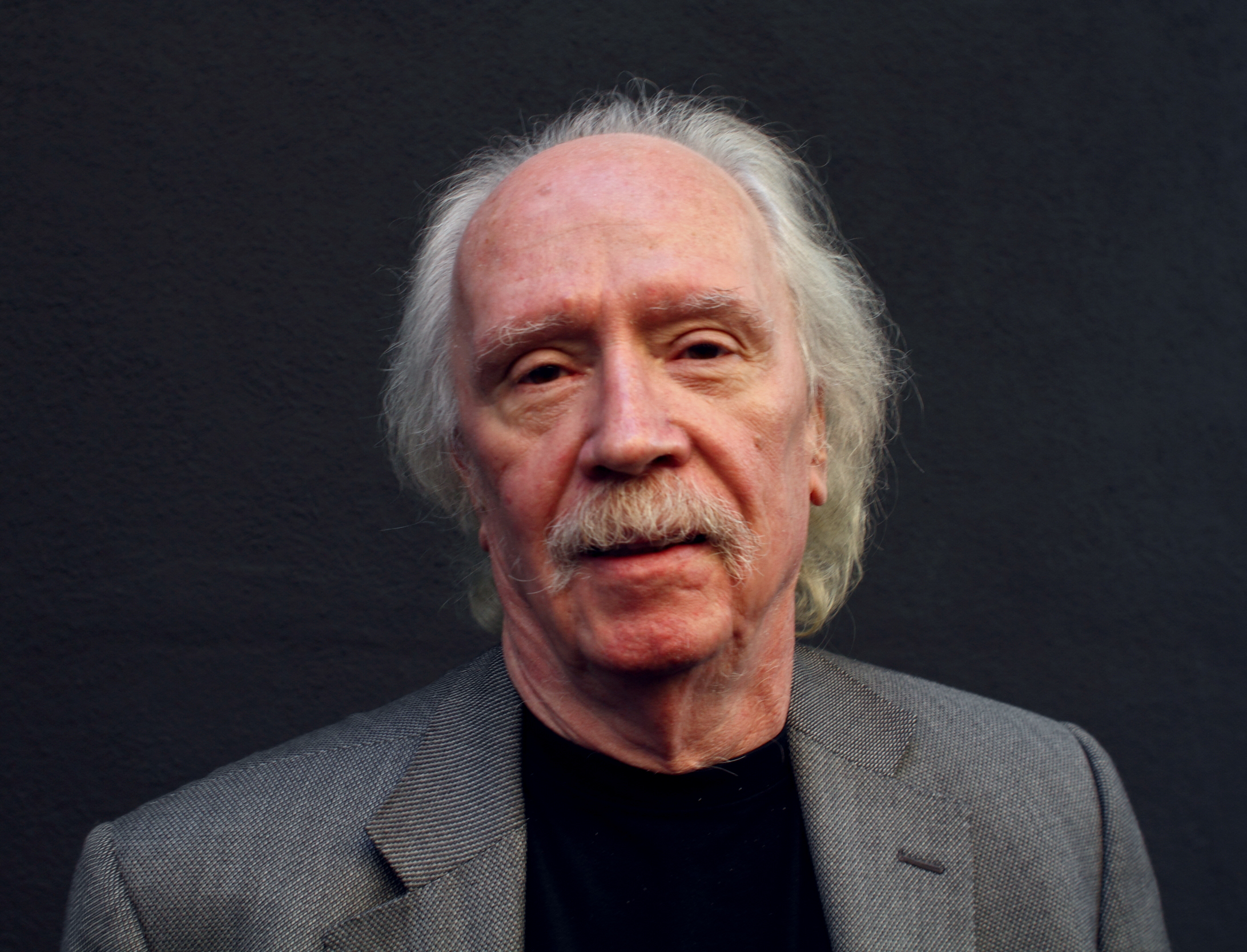
John Carpenter

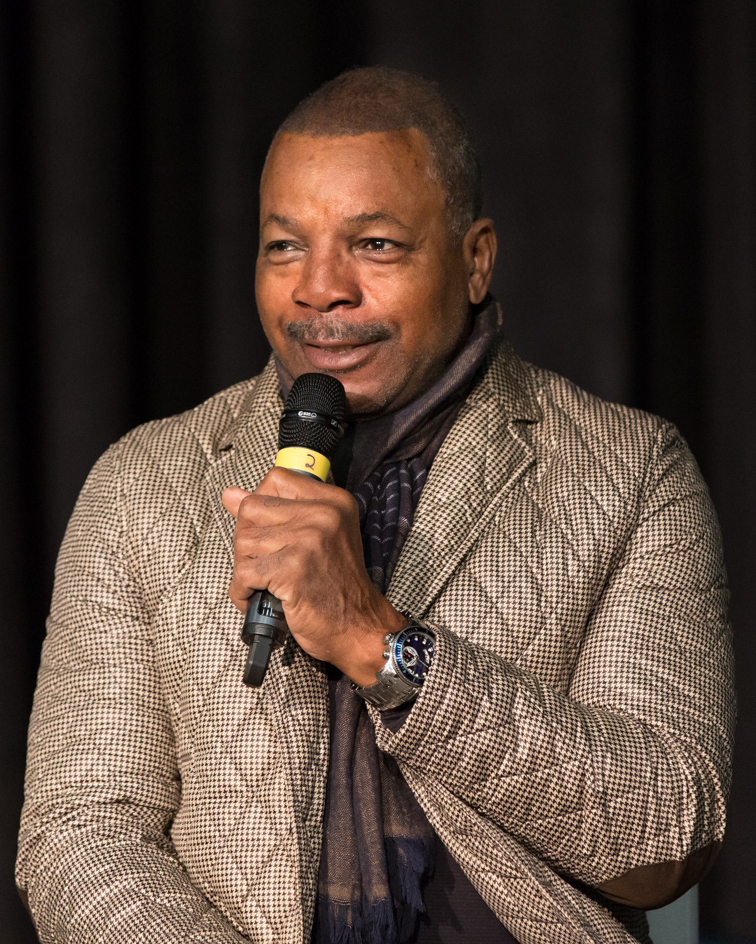
Carl Weathers

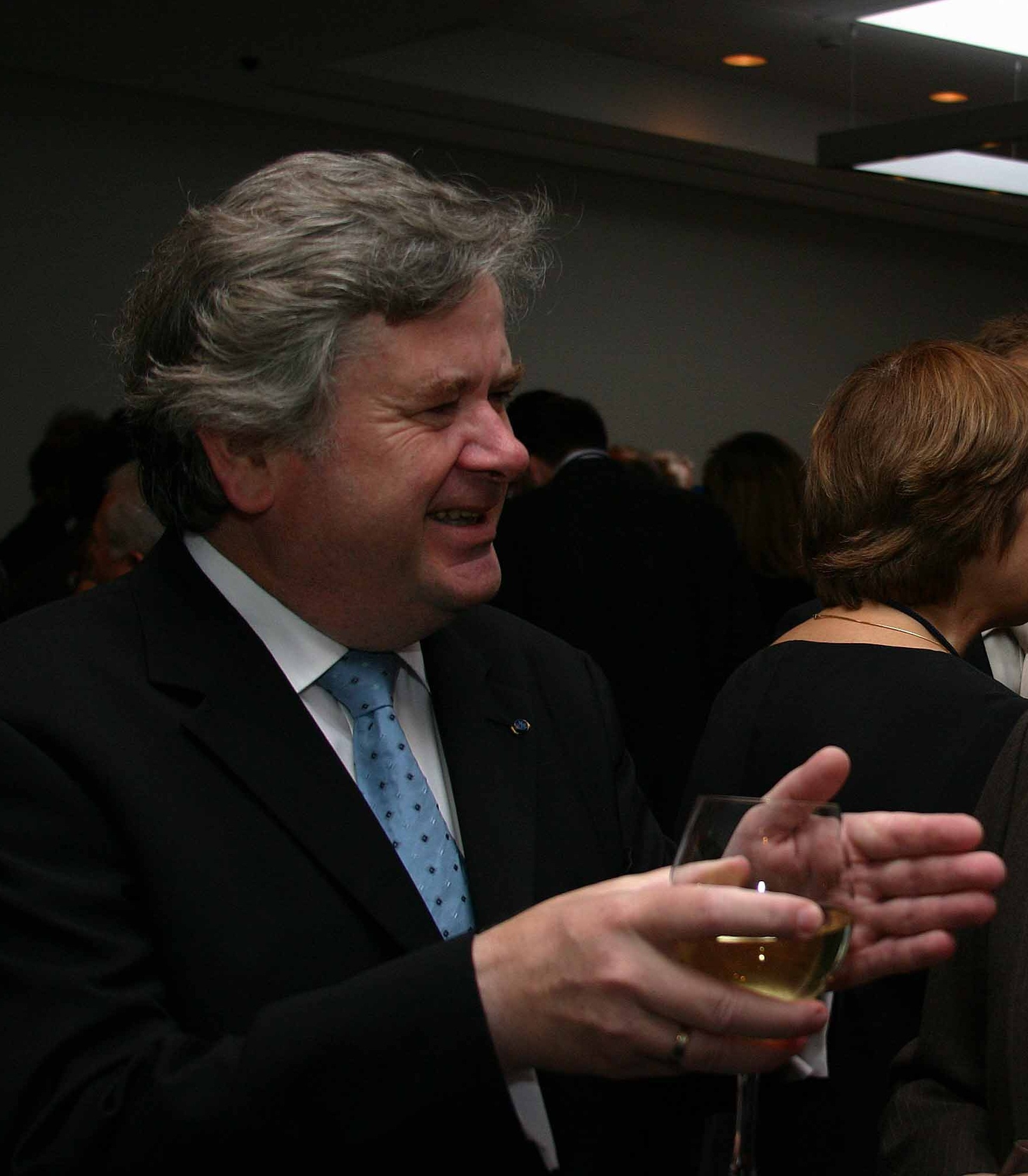
Davíð Oddsson

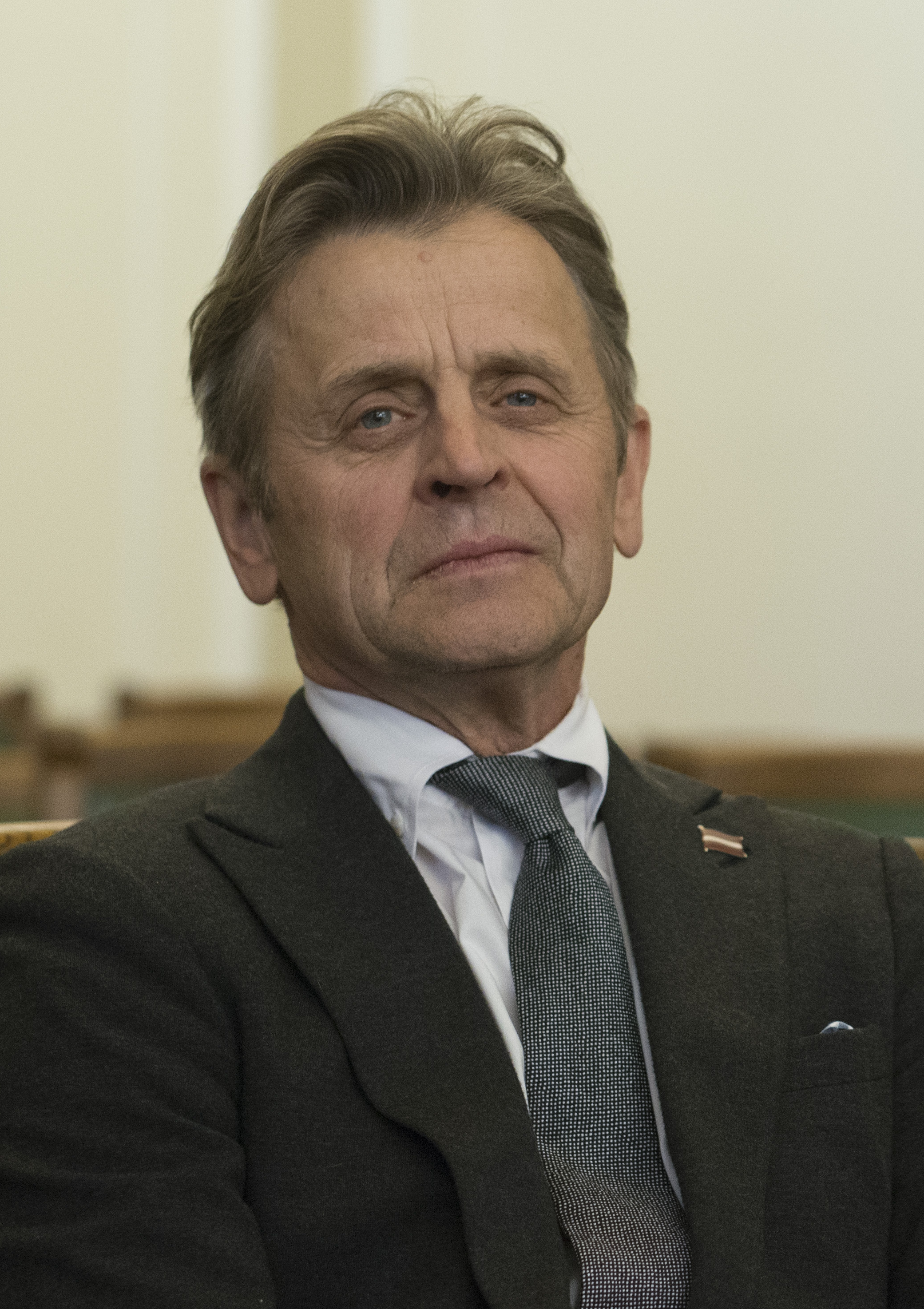
Mikhail Baryshnikov

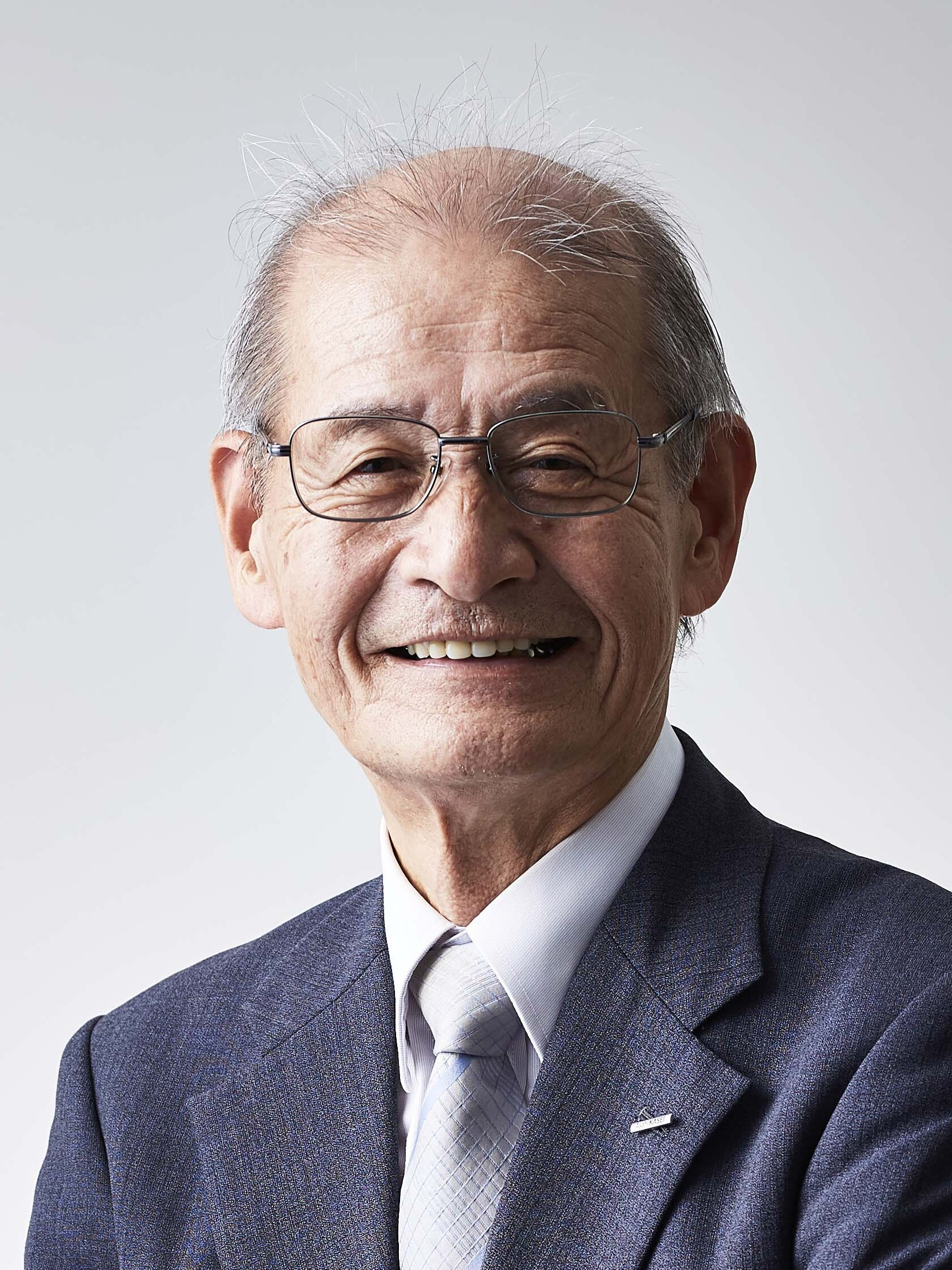
Akira Yoshino

- January 1 – Allan Alcorn, American engineer
- January 2
  - Judith Miller, American journalist
  - Joyce Wadler, American writer, memoirist
  - Deborah Watling, English actress (d. 2017)
- January 3 – Wanda Seux, Paraguayan vedette, dancer and actress (d. 2020)
- January 5
  - Wally Foreman, Australian media icon (d. 2006)
  - Ted Lange, African-American actor, director (The Love Boat)
- January 6
  - Guy Gardener, American astronaut
  - Bob Wise, Governor of West Virginia
- January 7
  - Kenny Loggins, American rock singer (Footloose)
  - Ichirou Mizuki, Japanese voice actor (d. 2022)
- January 10
  - Remu Aaltonen, Finnish musician
  - Donald Fagen, American rock keyboardist (Steely Dan)
  - Teresa Graves, African-American actress and comedian (Get Christie Love) (d. 2002)
  - Mischa Maisky, Latvian cellist
- January 11
  - Hiroshi Wajima, Japanese sumo wrestler (d. 2018)
  - Terry Goodkind, American writer (d. 2020)
  - Danne Larsson, Swedish musician
- January 12
  - Kenny Allen, English footballer
  - Anthony Andrews, English actor
- January 13
  - V. Krishnasamy, Malaysian footballer (d. 2020)
  - Françoise David, Canadian spokesperson
- January 14
  - T Bone Burnett, American record producer, musician
  - Muhriz of Negeri Sembilan, Yamtuan Besar of Negeri Sembilan
  - Carl Weathers, African-American actor, football player (Rocky IV, Action Jackson) (d. 2024)
- January 15 – Ronnie Van Zant, American rock musician (Lynyrd Skynyrd) (d. 1977)
- January 16
  - John Carpenter, American film director, producer, screenwriter and composer
  - Gregor Gysi, German politician
  - Cliff Thorburn, Canadian snooker player
  - Tsuneo Horiuchi, Japanese baseball pitcher, manager
- January 17
  - Billy T. James, New Zealand comedian, musician and actor (d. 1991)
  - Davíð Oddsson, Prime Minister of Iceland (d. 2026)
- January 18 – M. C. Gainey, American actor
- January 19
  - Lawrence Cartwright, Bahamian politician
  - Robert Llewellyn Lyons, Canadian politician
- January 20
  - Nancy Kress, American science fiction writer
  - Jerry L. Ross, American air engineer
- January 23
  - Katharine Holabird, American writer
  - Mitoji Yabunaka, Japanese politician
- January 24
  - Miklós Németh, Hungarian economist and politician, Prime Minister of Hungary from 1988 until 1990
- January 27
  - Mikhail Baryshnikov, Russian dancer
- January 28
  - Ilkka Kanerva, Finnish politician (d. 2022)
  - Charles Taylor, Liberian politician, 22nd President of Liberia
- January 29 – Marc Singer, Canadian actor (V)
- January 30
  - Akira Yoshino, Japanese chemist, Nobel Prize laureate
  - Paul Magee, Provisional Irish Republican Army member
- January 31
  - Paul Jabara, American actor, singer and songwriter (d. 1992)
  - Muneo Suzuki, Japanese politician

=== February ===
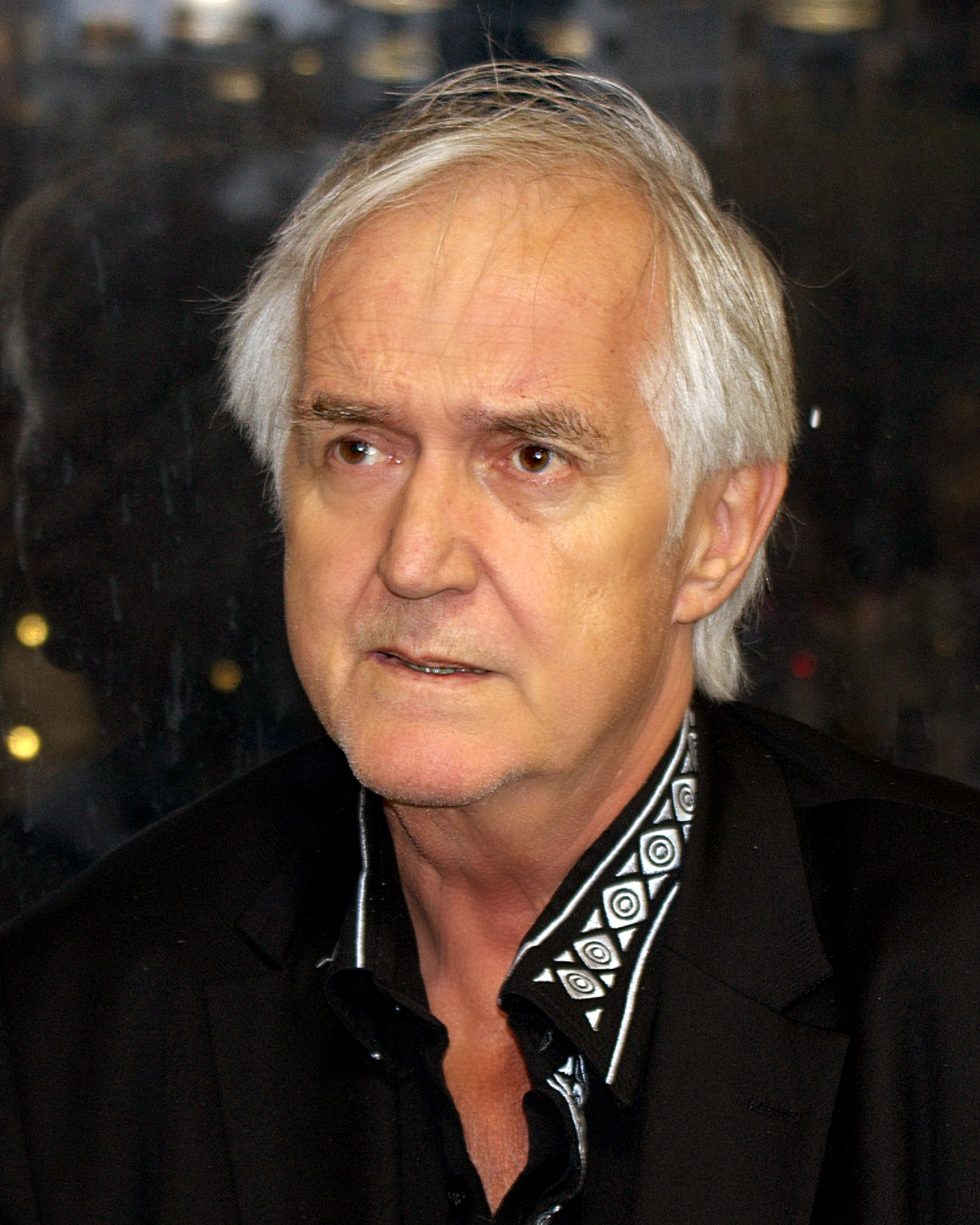
Henning Mankell

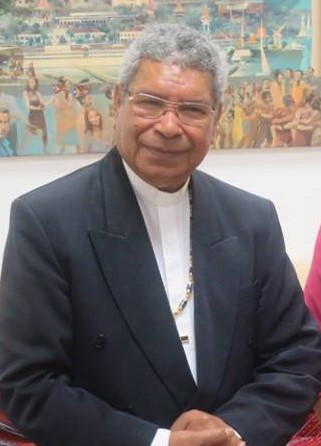
Carlos Felipe Ximenes Belo

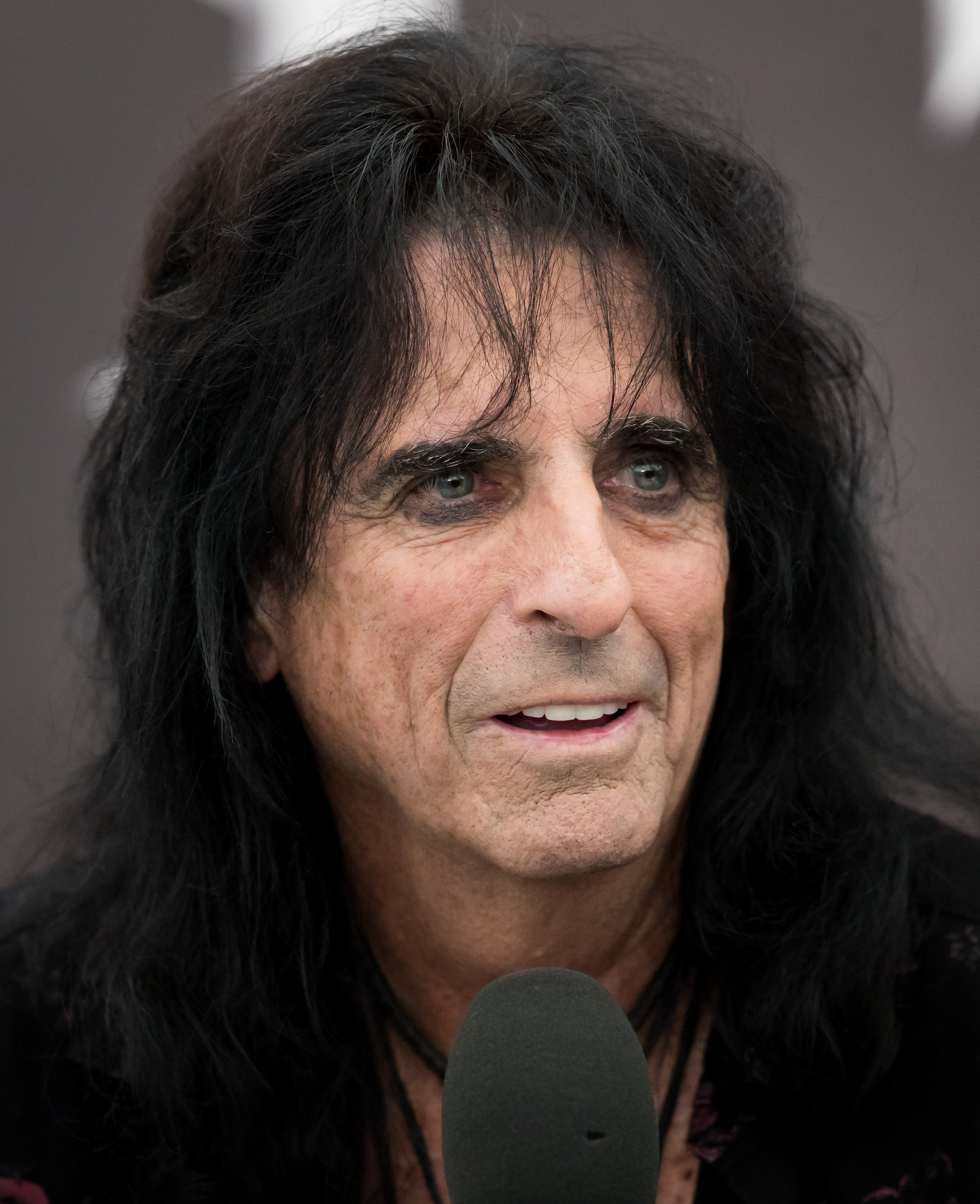
Alice Cooper

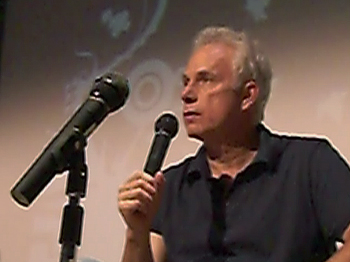
Christopher Guest

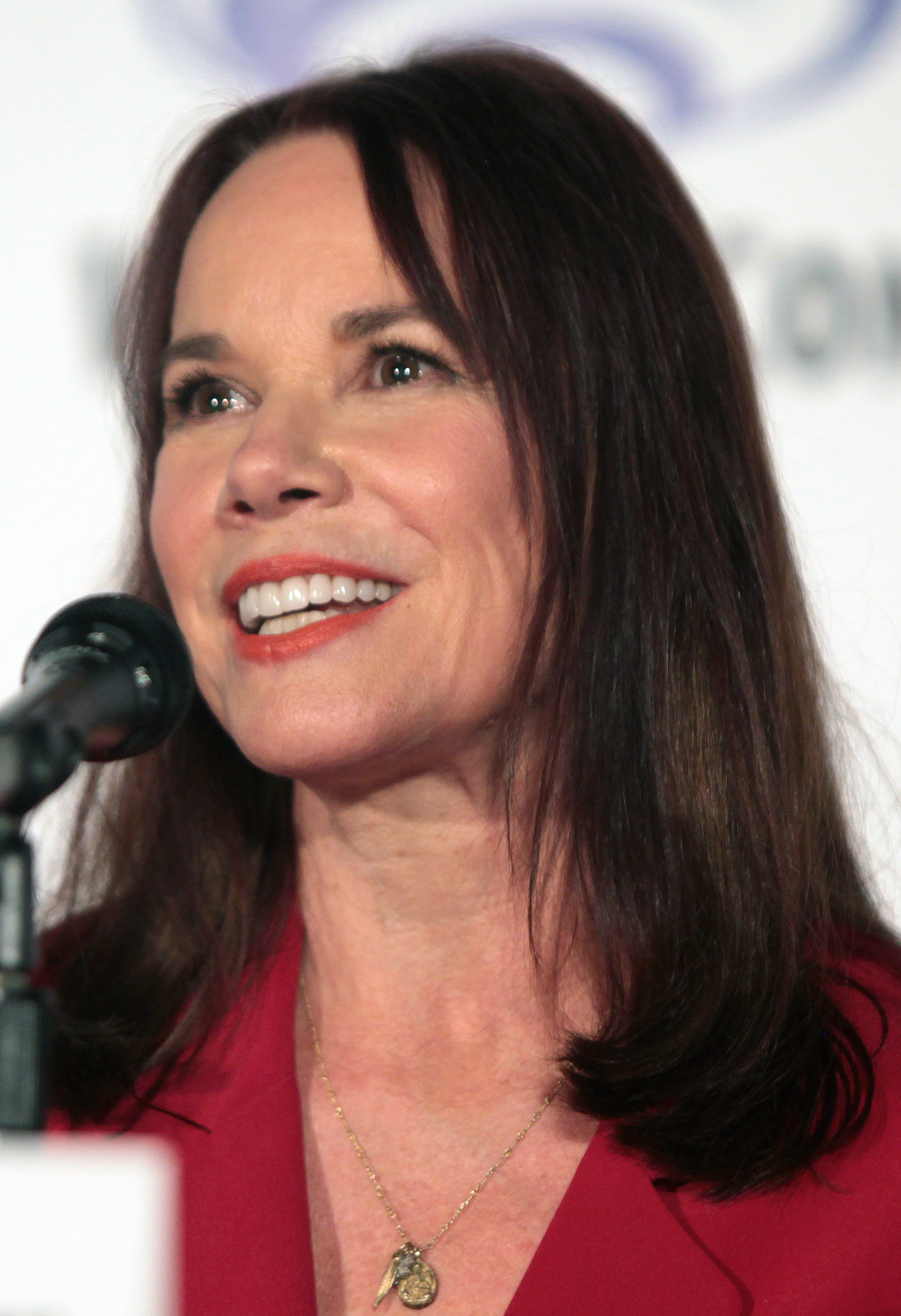
Barbara Hershey

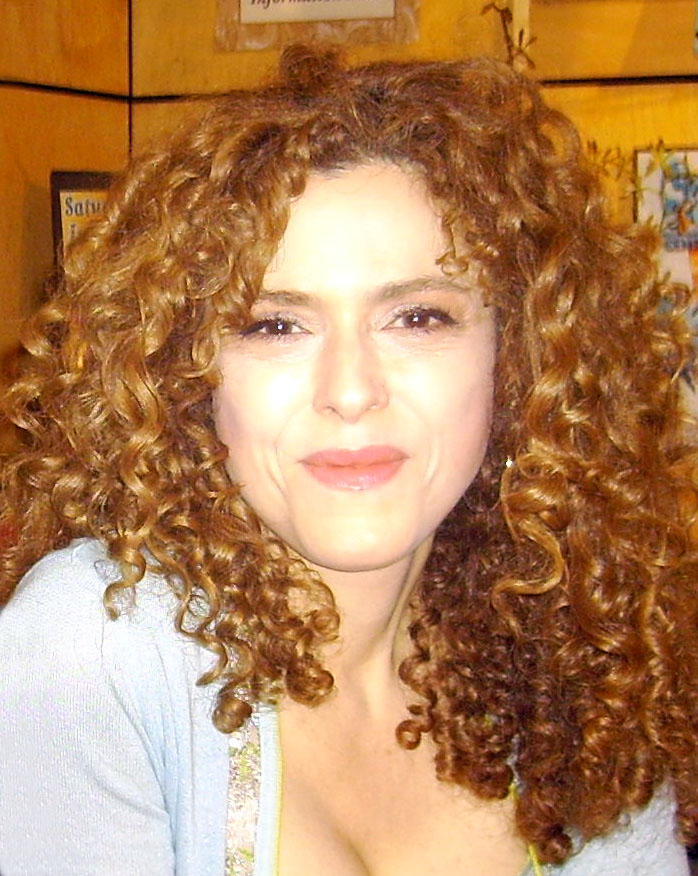
Bernadette Peters

- February 1 – Rick James, African-American urban singer-songwriter, multi-instrumentalist and record producer (d. 2004)
- February 2
  - Ina Garten, American cooking author
  - Roger Williamson, British race car driver (d. 1973)
- February 3
  - Carlos Filipe Ximenes Belo, East Timorean Catholic bishop, recipient of the Nobel Peace Prize
  - Henning Mankell, Swedish crime novelist (d. 2015)
- February 4
  - Alice Cooper, American hard rock singer and musician (School's Out)
  - Ram Baran Yadav, President of Nepal
- February 5
  - Jim Dornan, Northern Irish obstetrician and gynecologist (d. 2021)
  - Sven-Göran Eriksson, Swedish football manager (d. 2024)
  - Christopher Guest, American actor, screenwriter, director and composer (National Lampoon, Saturday Night Live)
  - Barbara Hershey, American actress (Beaches)
  - Tom Wilkinson, English actor (d. 2023)
- February 7
  - Susan Doran, British historian
  - Jimmy Greenspoon, American keyboardist, composer (Three Dog Night) (d. 2015)
- February 8 – Dan Seals, American musician (d. 2009)
- February 9
  - David Hayman, Scottish film, television and stage actor, director
  - Greg Stafford, American game designer, publisher (d. 2018)
- February 10
  - Ûssarĸak K'ujaukitsoĸ, Greenlandic Inuk politician, human rights activist (d. 2018)
  - John Magnier, Irish businessman, thoroughbred racehorse breeder
- February 11 – Chris Rush, American stand-up comedian
- February 12 – Raymond Kurzweil, American inventor, author
- February 13 – Kitten Natividad, Mexican-American film actress (d. 2022)
- February 14
  - Jackie Martling, American comedian, radio personality
  - Wally Tax, Dutch musician (d. 2005)
  - Raymond Teller, American illusionist and magician, one half of the duo Penn & Teller
  - Yehuda Shoenfeld, Israeli physician, autoimmunity researcher
- February 15 – Larry DiTillio, American film and TV series writer (d. 2019)
- February 16 – Eckhart Tolle, German-Canadian spiritual author
- February 17
  - György Cserhalmi, Hungarian actor
  - José José, Mexican singer, actor (d. 2019)
- February 18 – Sinéad Cusack, Irish actress
- February 19
  - Pim Fortuyn, Dutch politician, author (d. 2002)
  - Tony Iommi, English heavy metal guitarist
  - Elizabeth Sackler, American activist
  - Raúl Grijalva, American politician, member of the U.S. House of Representatives (d. 2025)
- February 20 – Jennifer O'Neill, American model, actress
- February 21 – Christian Vander (musician), French drummer, founder of progressive rock/Zeuhl group Magma
- February 22
  - John Ashton, American actor (d. 2024)
  - Leslie H. Sabo Jr., American Medal of Honor recipient (d. 1970)
- February 24
  - Jayalalithaa, Indian politician, film actress (d. 2016)
  - Walter Smith, Scottish football manager (d. 2021)
- February 25 – Danny Denzongpa, Indian actor
- February 28
  - Steven Chu, American physicist, Nobel Prize laureate
  - Mike Figgis, American director, screenwriter and composer
  - Kjell Isaksson, Swedish pole vaulter
  - Bernadette Peters, American actress, singer
  - Mercedes Ruehl, American actress
  - Alfred Sant, Leader of Malta Labour Party (1992–), Prime Minister of Malta (1996–1998)
- February 29
  - Khalid Salleh, Malaysian actor, poet (d. 2018)
  - Ken Foree, American actor
  - Henry Small, American-born Canadian singer

=== March ===
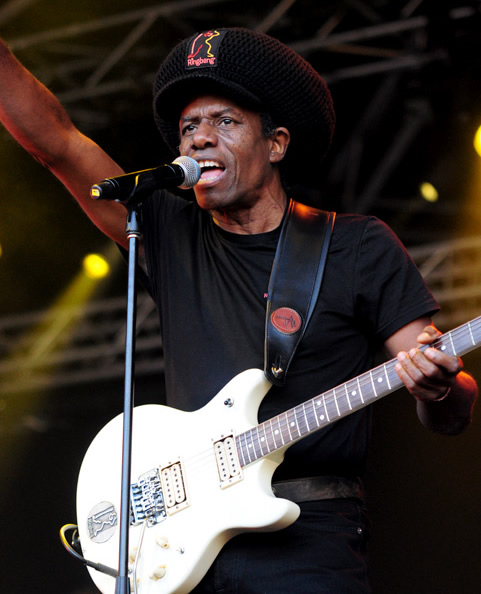
Eddy Grant

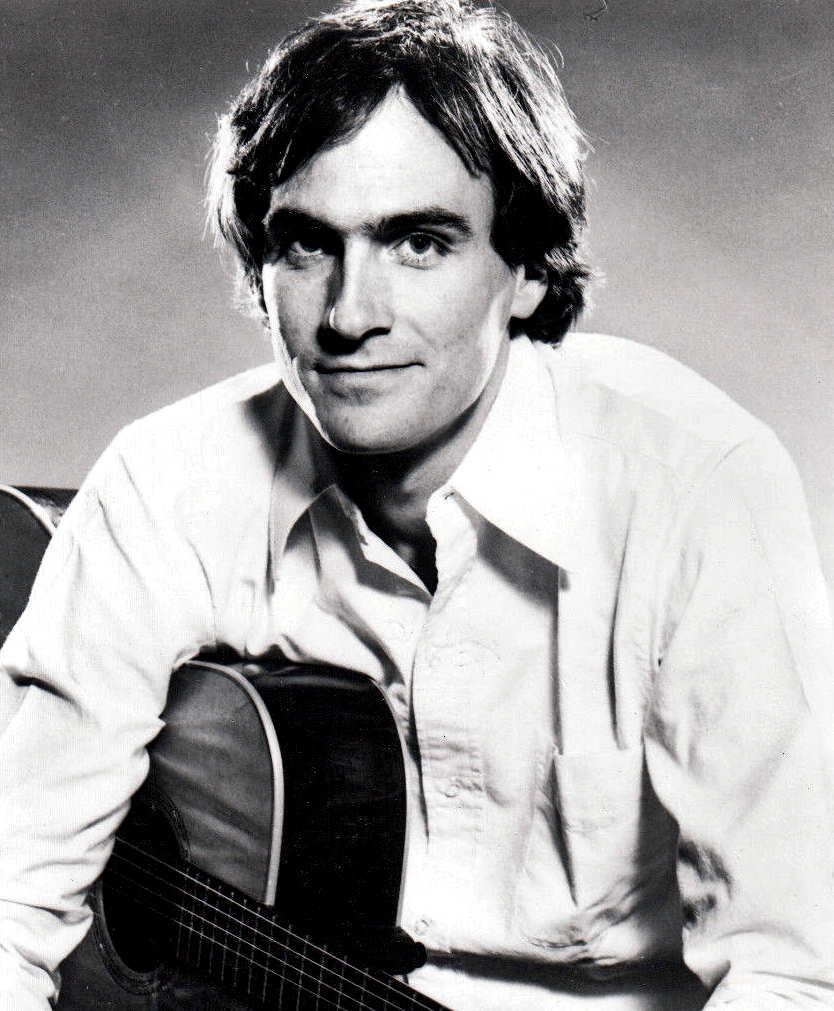
James Taylor

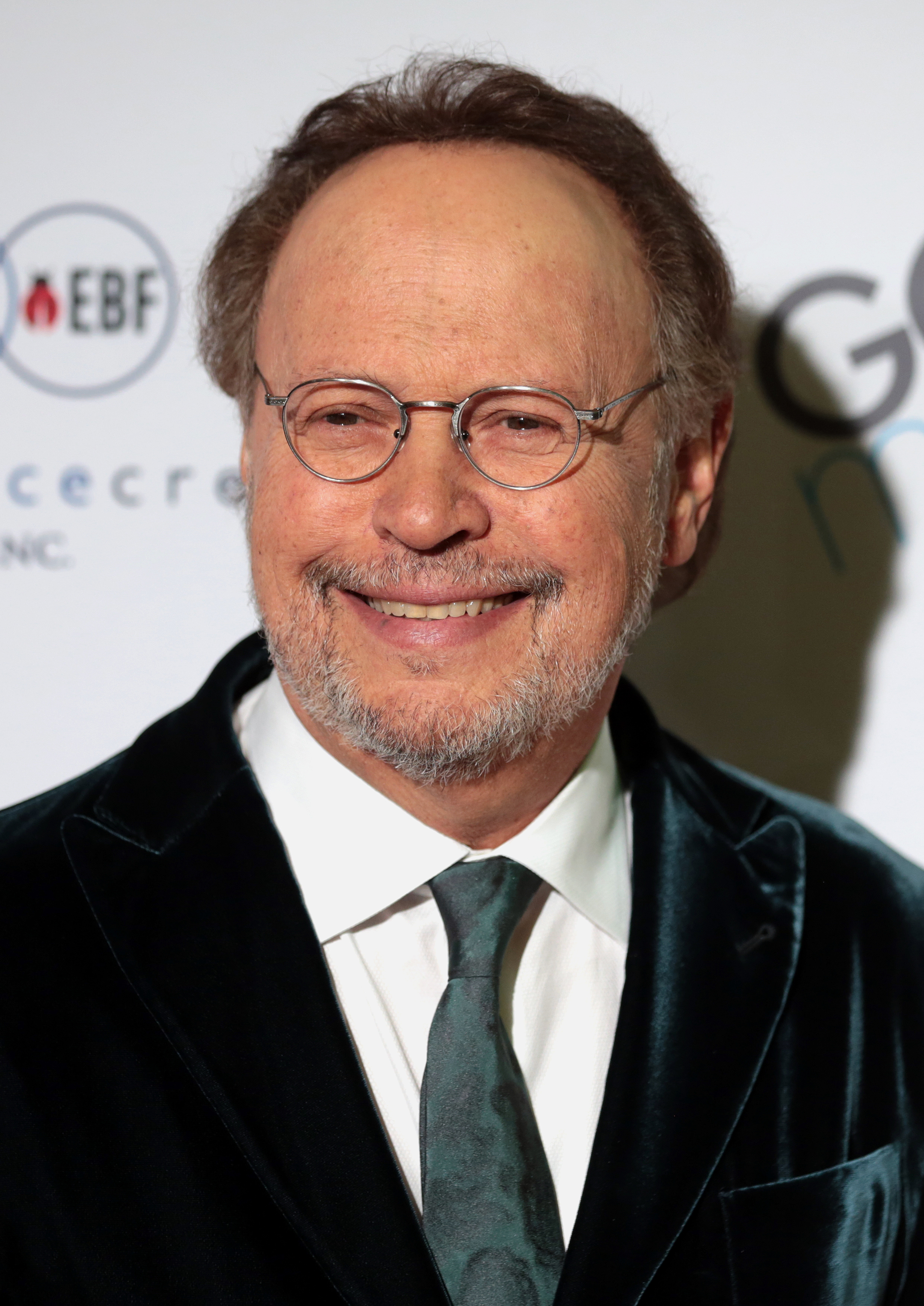
Billy Crystal

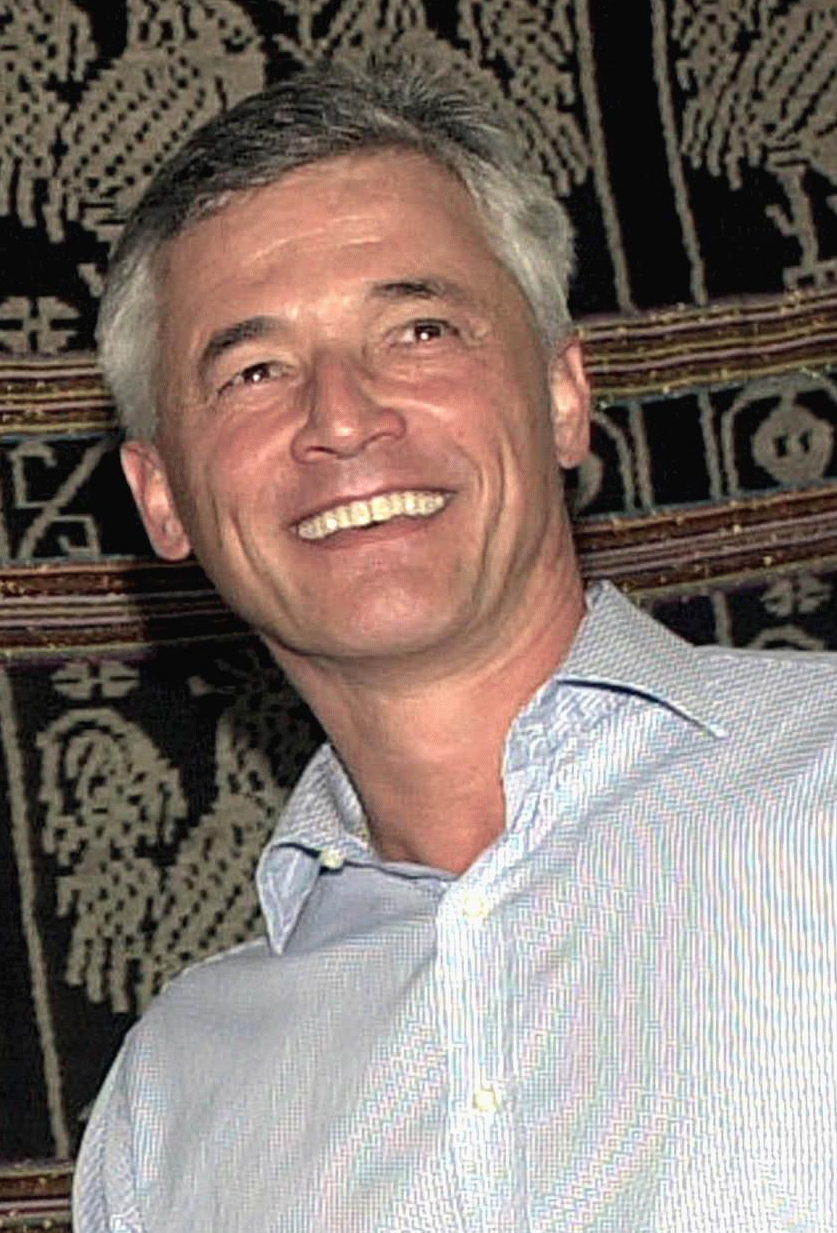
Sérgio Vieira de Mello

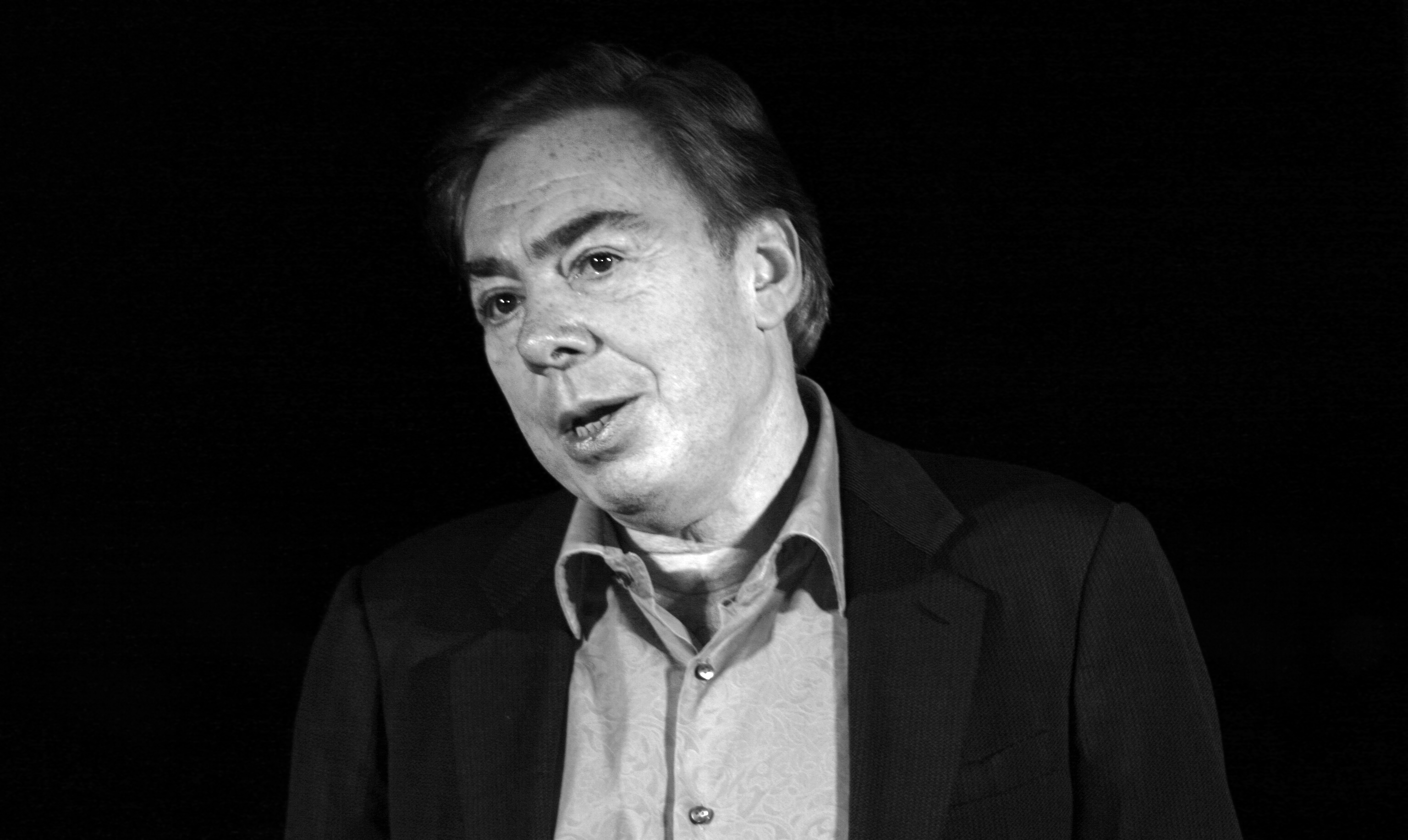
Andrew Lloyd Webber

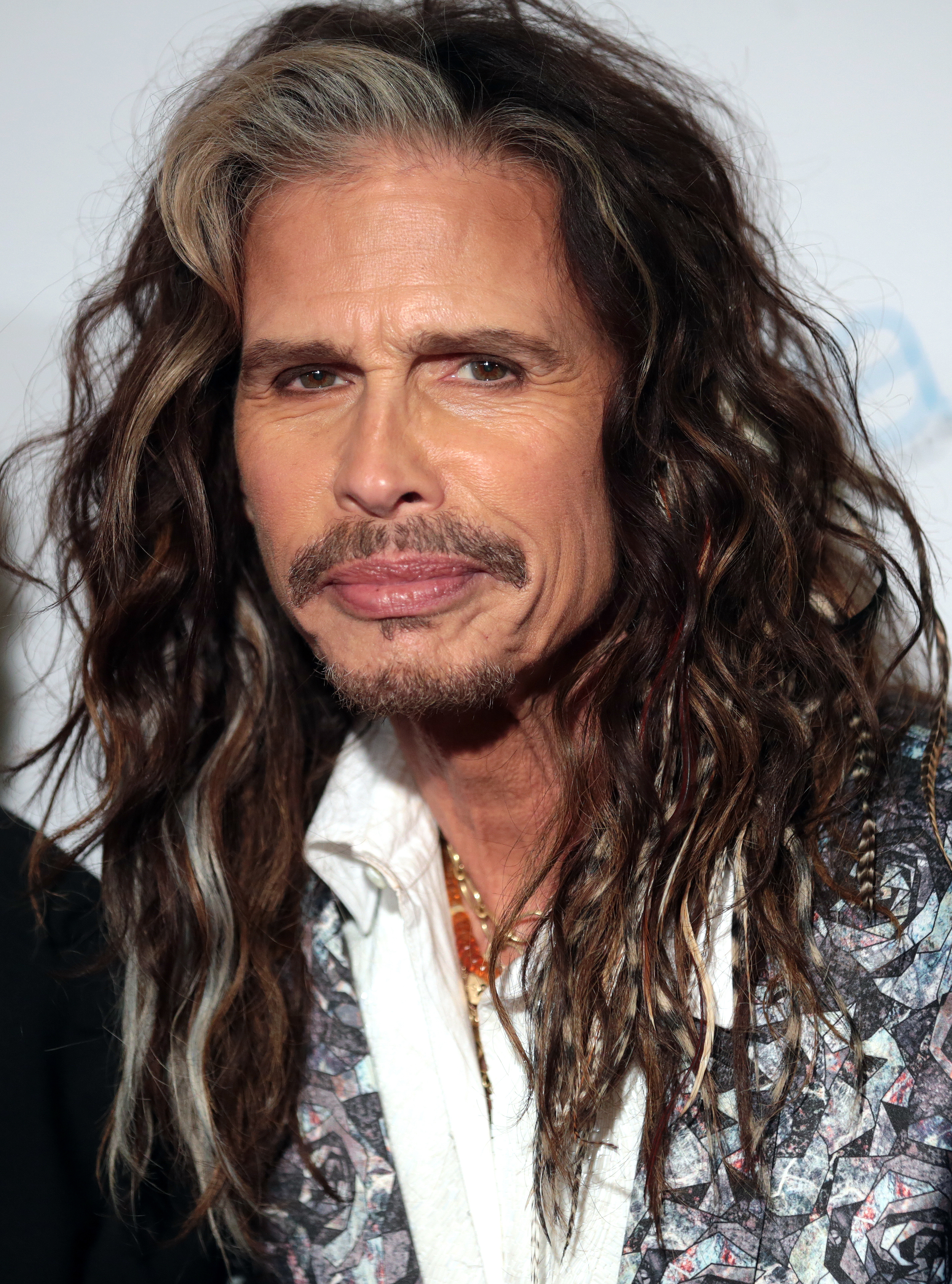
Steven Tyler

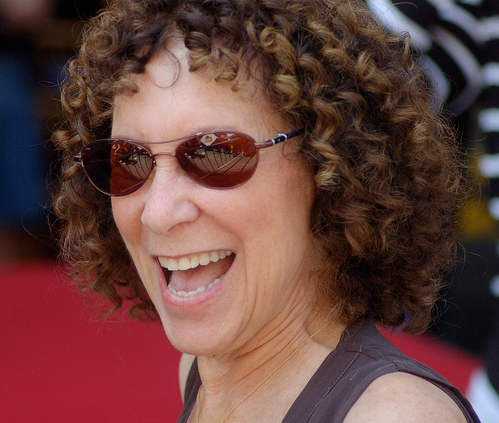
Rhea Perlman

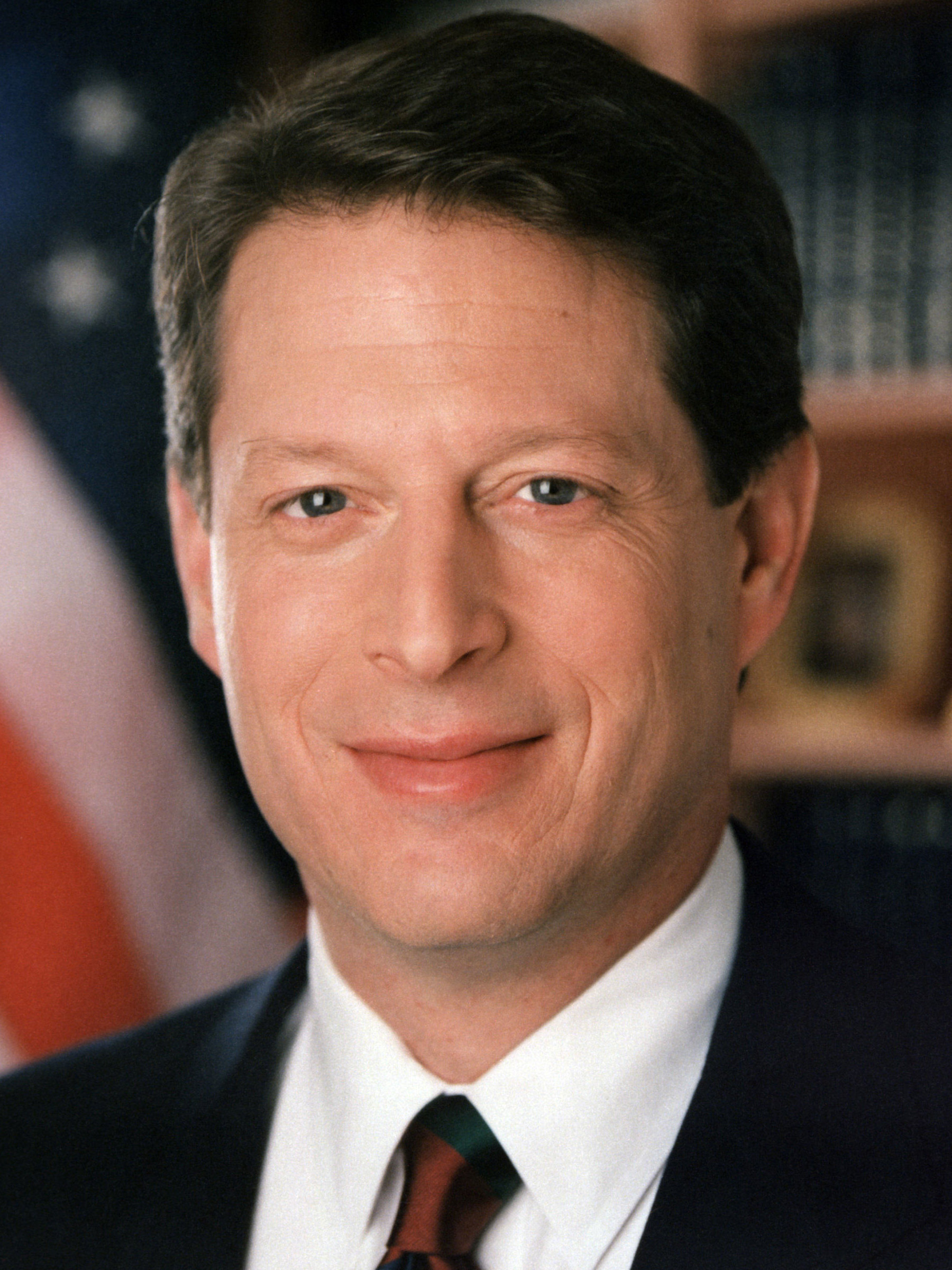
Al Gore

- March 1 – Gopanarayan Das, Indian politician (d. 2022)
- March 2
  - R. T. Crowley, American pioneer of electronic commerce
  - Rory Gallagher, Irish musician (d. 1995)
  - Jeff Kennett, Australian politician
- March 3
  - Steve Wilhite, American computer scientist, developer of the GIF image format at CompuServe in 1987 (d. 2022)
- March 4
  - Lindy Chamberlain-Creighton, Australian author (A Cry in the Dark)
  - James Ellroy, American writer
  - Tom Grieve, American baseball player
  - Leron Lee, American baseball player
  - Chris Squire, English bassist (Yes) (d. 2015)
  - Shakin' Stevens, Welsh singer
  - Brian Cummings, American voice actor
- March 5
  - Eddy Grant, Guyanese British singer, musician ("Electric Avenue")
  - Elaine Paige, English singer, actress
- March 6 – Anna Maria Horsford, African-American actress (Amen)
- March 8
  - Sinta Nuriyah, 4th First Lady of Indonesia, wife of Abdurrahman Wahid
  - Jonathan Sacks, British Orthodox rabbi, philosopher, theologian, author and politician (d. 2020)
- March 9
  - László Lovász, Hungarian mathematician
  - Jeffrey Osborne, American singer ("On the Wings of Love")
- March 10 – Doug Clark, American serial killer (d. 2023)
- March 11
  - Dominique Sanda, French actress
- March 12 – James Taylor, American singer, songwriter ("Fire and Rain")
- March 13 – Maurice A. de Gosson, Austrian mathematician
- March 14 – Billy Crystal, American actor, comedian
- March 15 – Sérgio Vieira de Mello, Brazilian diplomat (d. 2003)
- March 16 – Margaret Weis, American science fiction writer
- March 17 – William Gibson, American/Canadian writer
- March 18
  - Jessica B. Harris, American historian and journalist
  - Bobby Whitlock, American singer, songwriter and musician (d. 2025)
- March 20
  - John de Lancie, American actor
  - Bobby Orr, Canadian hockey player
  - Helene Vannari, Estonian actress (d. 2022)
- March 22
  - Inri Cristo, Brazilian educator who claims to be Jesus Christ reincarnated
  - Wolf Blitzer, American television journalist (CNN)
  - Andrew Lloyd Webber, English composer (Jesus Christ Superstar)
- March 25 – Bonnie Bedelia, American actress
- March 26
  - Nash the Slash (b. James Jeffrey Plewman), Canadian musician (d. 2014)
  - Steven Tyler, American rock singer, songwriter (Aerosmith)
  - Gayyur Yunus, Azerbaijani painter
- March 28
  - Jayne Ann Krentz, American novelist
  - Dianne Wiest, American actress
- March 29
  - Mike Heideman, American basketball coach (d. 2018)
  - Bud Cort, American actor (d. 2026)
- March 30 – Eddie Jordan, Irish founder of Jordan Grand Prix (d. 2025)
- March 31
  - Rhea Perlman, American actress (Cheers)
  - Al Gore, American politician and environmentalist, 45th Vice President of the United States
  - Thijs Van Leer, Dutch musician

=== April ===
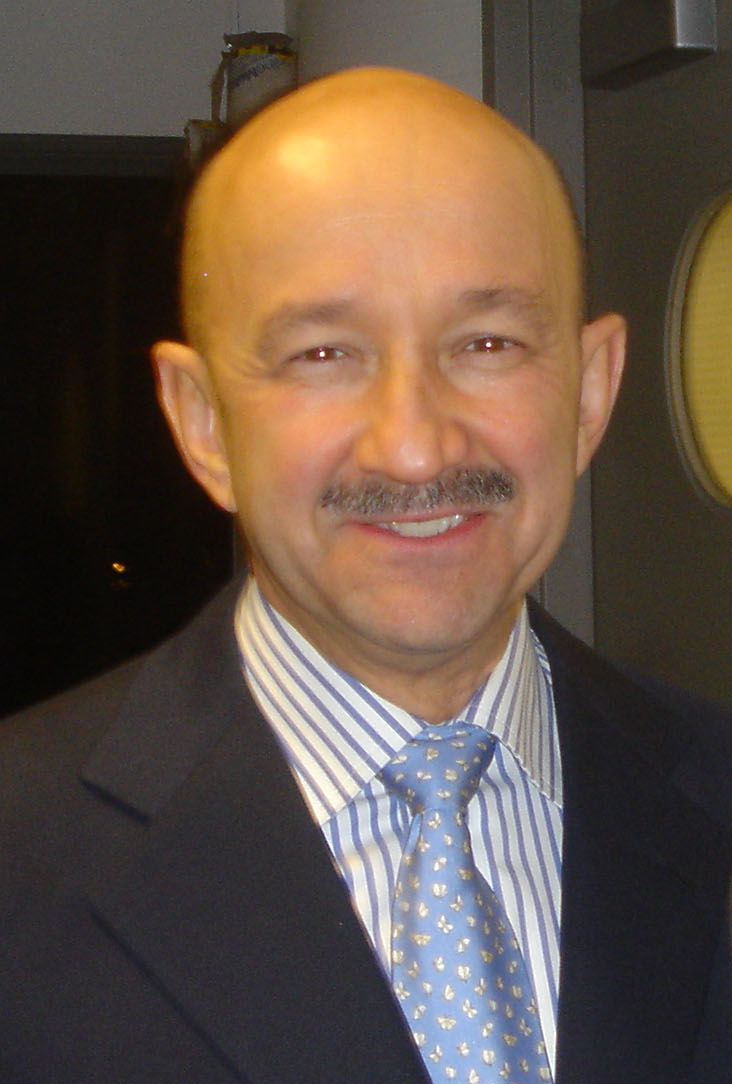
Carlos Salinas de Gortari

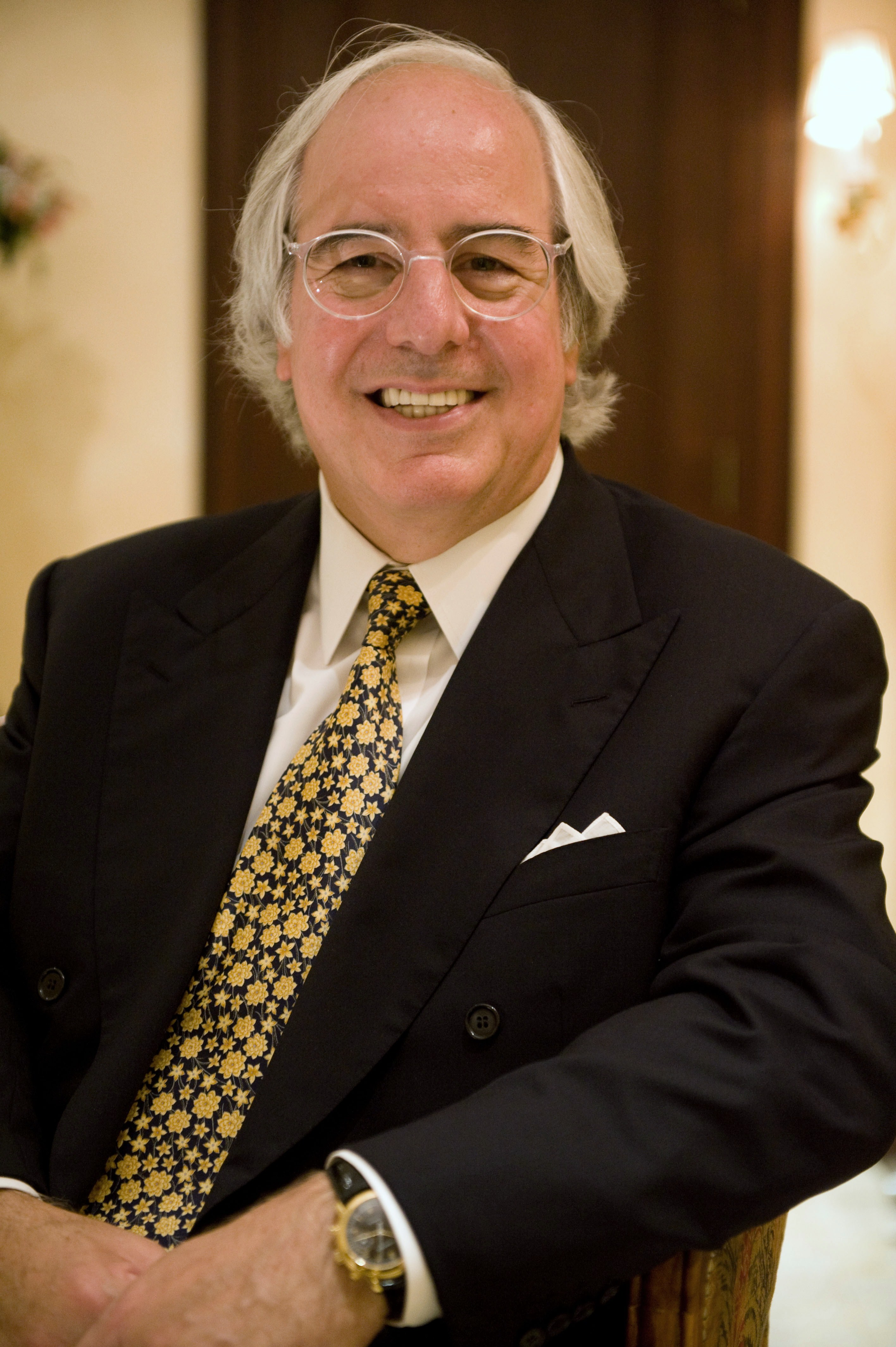
Frank Abagnale

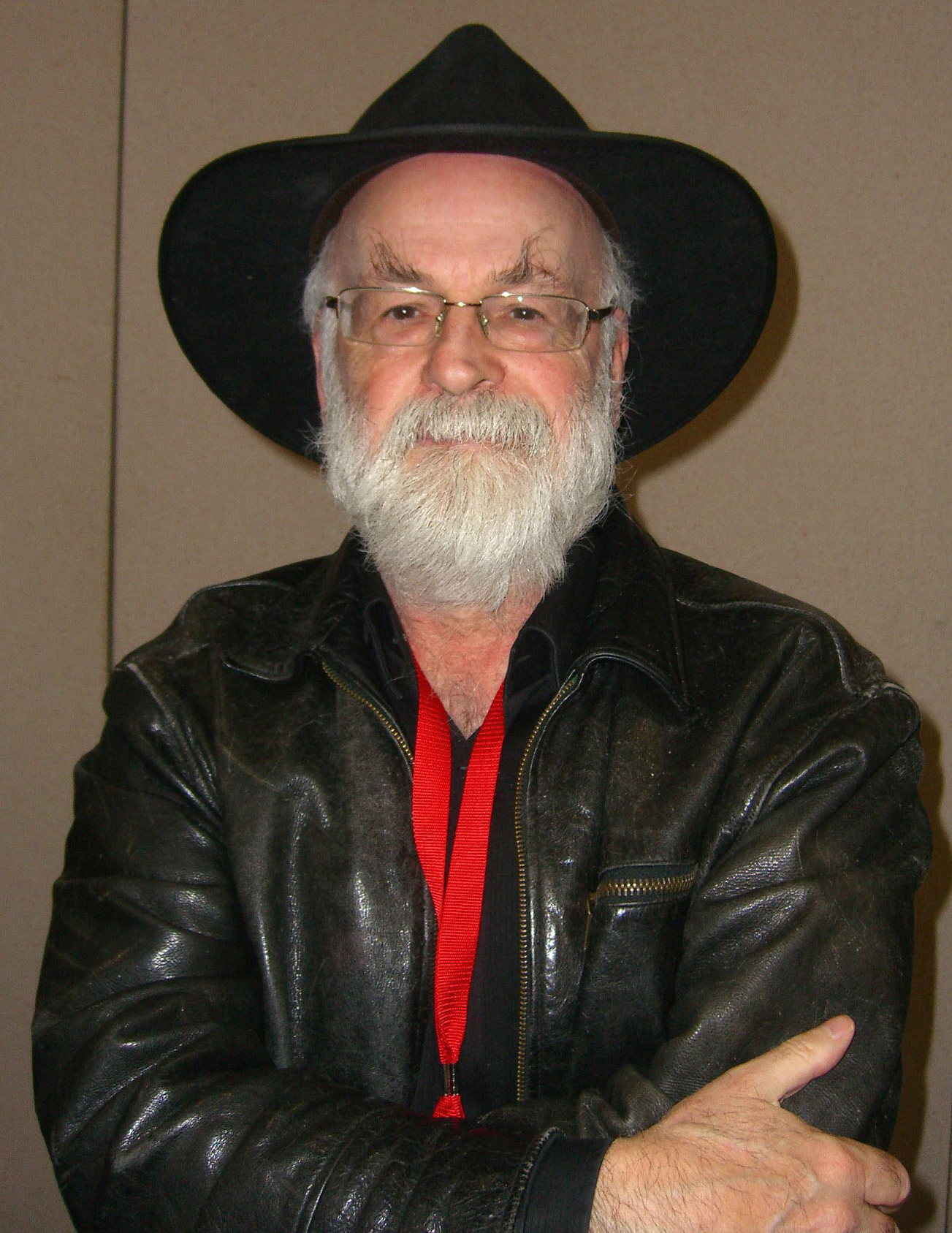
Terry Pratchett

- April 1 – Jimmy Cliff, Jamaican singer, actor
- April 2
  - Bob Lienhard, American basketball player (d. 2018)
  - Roald Als, Danish cartoonist
- April 3 – Carlos Salinas de Gortari, Mexican economist, politician and 53rd President of Mexico (1988–1994)
- April 4
  - Squire Parsons, American gospel singer, songwriter (d. 2025)
  - Dan Simmons, American fantasy, science fiction author (d. 2026)
  - Berry Oakley, American musician (d. 1972)
- April 5 – Neil Portnow, American President of The Recording Academy (NARAS)
- April 7
  - Arnie Robinson, American Olympic Long jump champion (d. 2020)
  - John Oates, American rock singer, guitarist (Hall & Oates)
  - Pietro Anastasi, Italian football player (d. 2020)
- April 9 – Jaya Bachchan, Indian actress and politician
- April 10 – Fauzi Bowo, Indonesian politician and diplomat, governor of Jakarta
- April 12
  - Jeremy Beadle, English TV presenter (d. 2008)
  - Don Fernando, American pornographic film actor, director
  - Joschka Fischer, German politician
  - Marcello Lippi, Italian football player, manager
- April 13
  - Nam Hae-il, 25th Chief of Naval Operations of the Republic of Korea Navy
  - Mikhail Shufutinsky, Soviet, Russian singer, actor and TV presenter
- April 15 – Michael Kamen, American composer (d. 2003)
- April 16
  - Ammar El Sherei, Egyptian music icon, celebrity (d. 2012)
  - Kazuyuki Sogabe, Japanese voice actor (d. 2006)
- April 17
  - Jan Hammer, Czech-American composer, pianist and keyboardist
  - Peter Jenni, Swiss experimental particle physicist
- April 18 – Avi Arad, Israeli-American film producer
- April 20 – Paul Milgrom, American economist, Nobel Prize laureate
- April 21
  - Paul Davis, American singer, songwriter (Cool Night) (d. 2008)
  - Josef Flammer, Swiss ophthalmologist (after whom Flammer syndrome is named)
- April 24 – István Szívós, Hungarian water polo player (d. 2019)
- April 27
  - Amrit Kumar Bohara, Nepalese politician
  - Frank Abagnale, American con man, imposter
  - Si Robertson, American reality star, preacher, hunter, outdoorsman and U.S. Army veteran
- April 28
  - Terry Pratchett, English comic fantasy, science fiction author (d. 2015)
  - Marcia Strassman, American actress, singer (Welcome Back, Kotter) (d. 2014)
- April 29
  - Michael Karoli, German musician (d. 2001)
  - John Batchelor, American author and radio host
- April 30 – Jocelyne Saab, Lebanese journalist, film director (d. 2019)

=== May ===
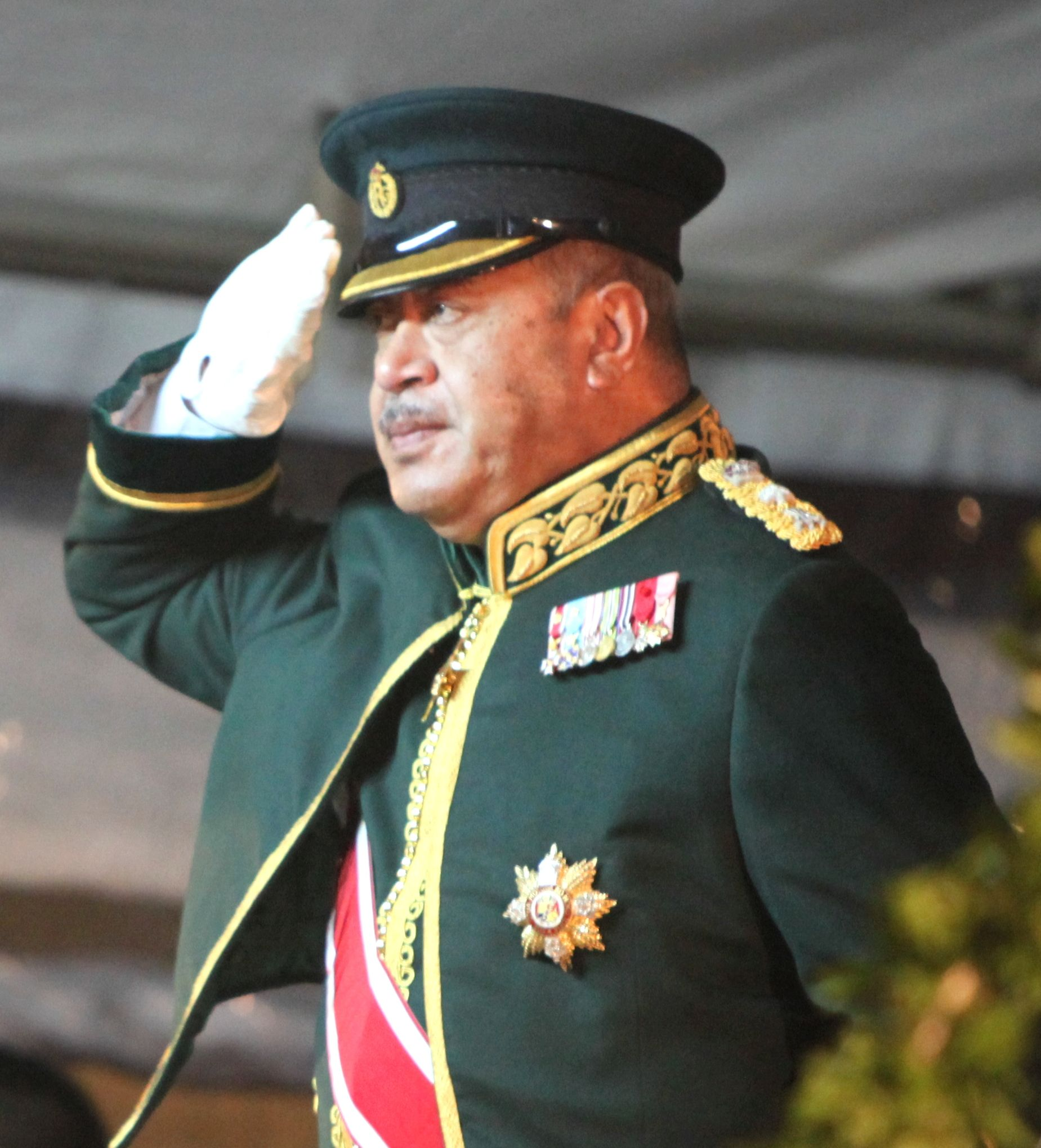
George Tupou V

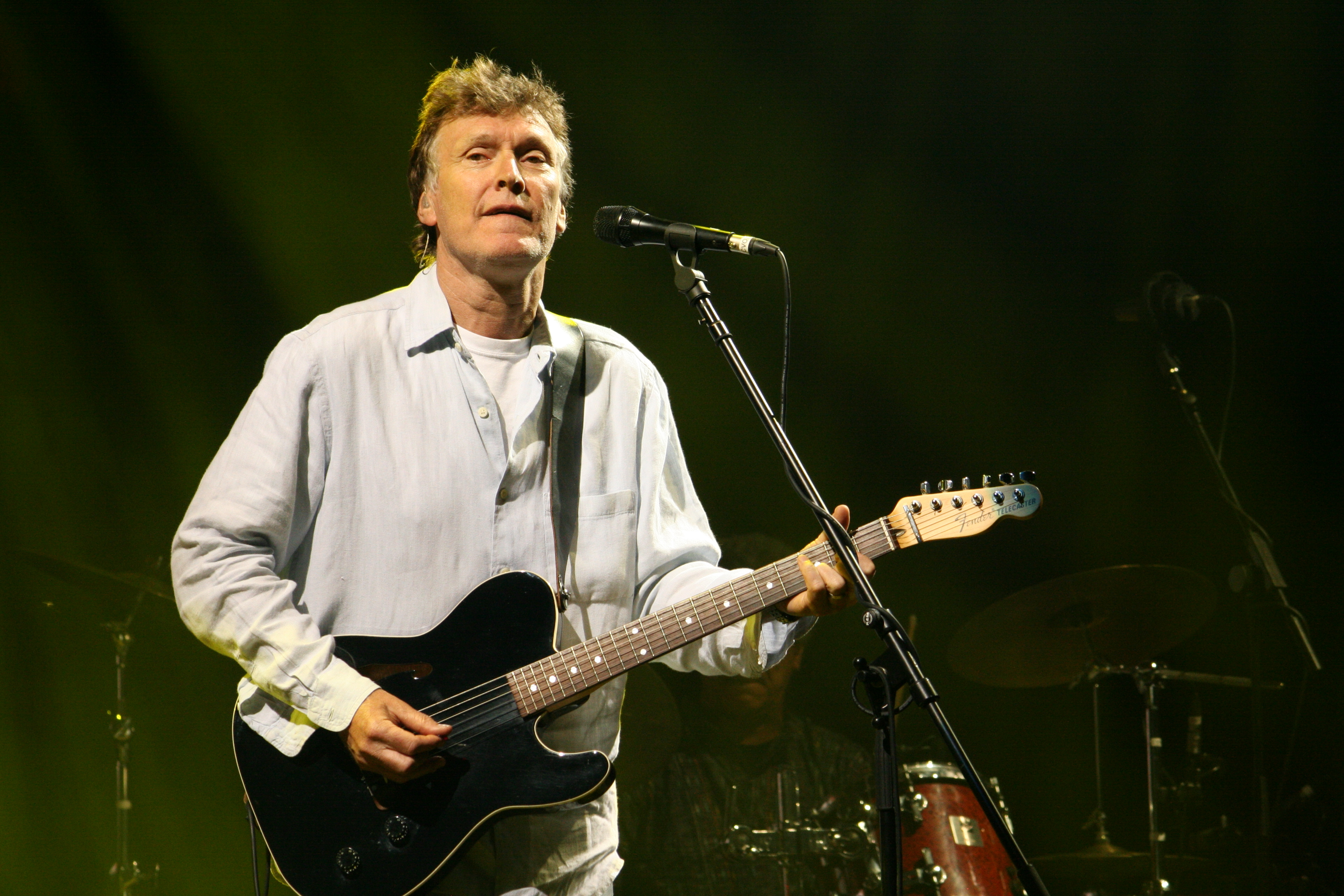
Steve Winwood

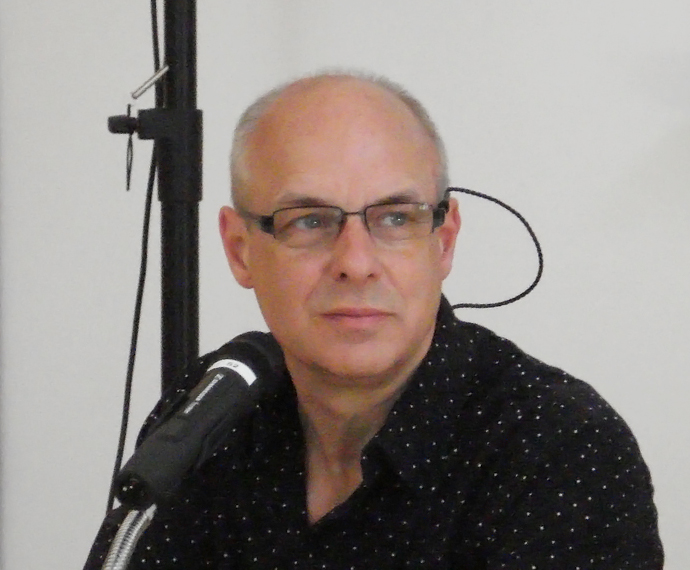
Brian Eno

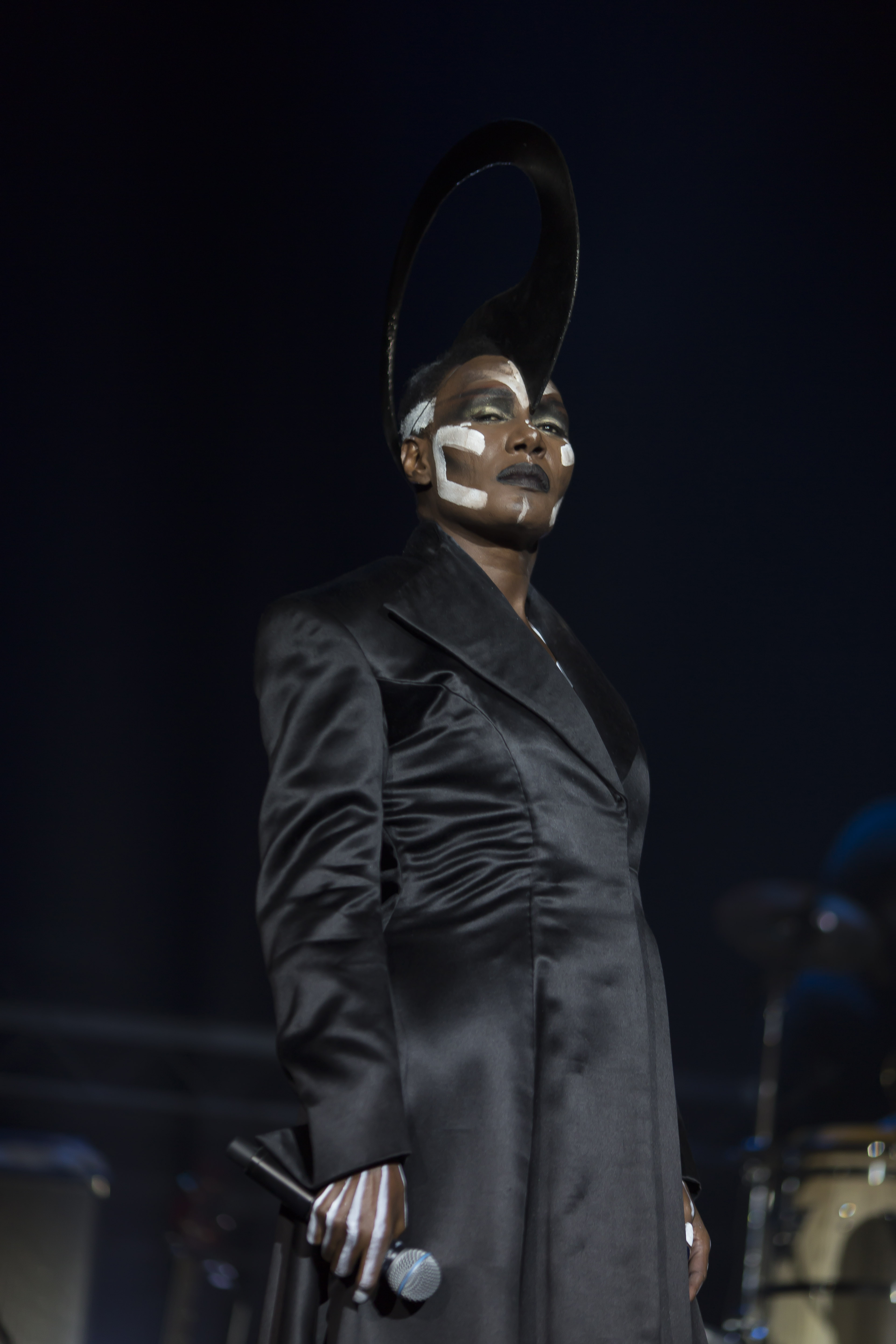
Grace Jones

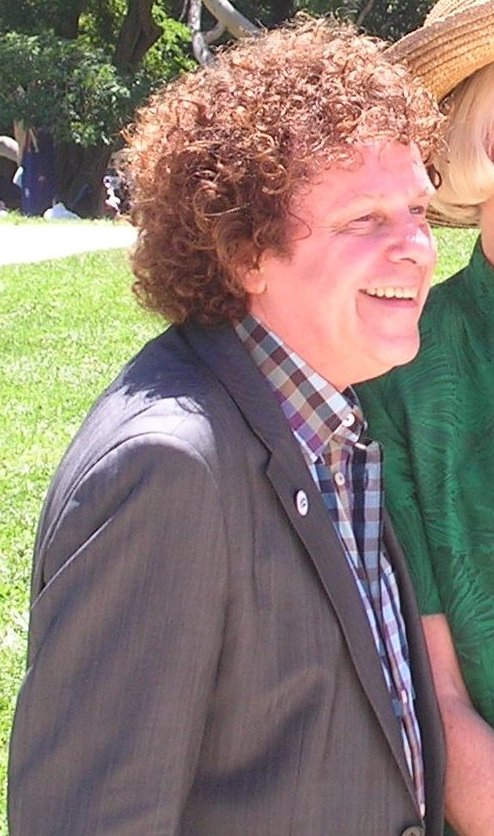
Leo Sayer

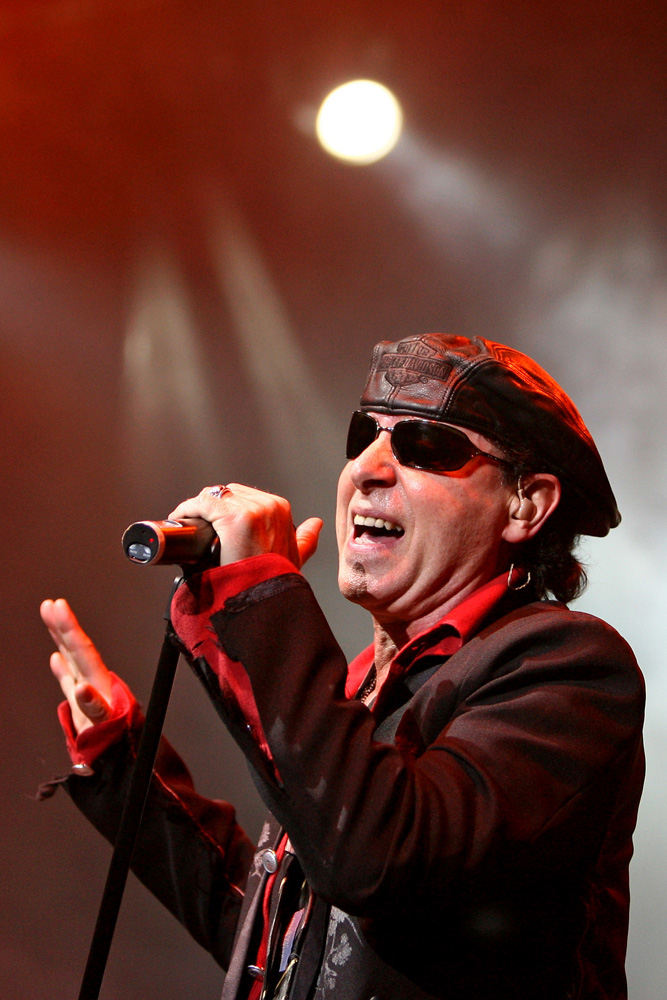
Klaus Meine

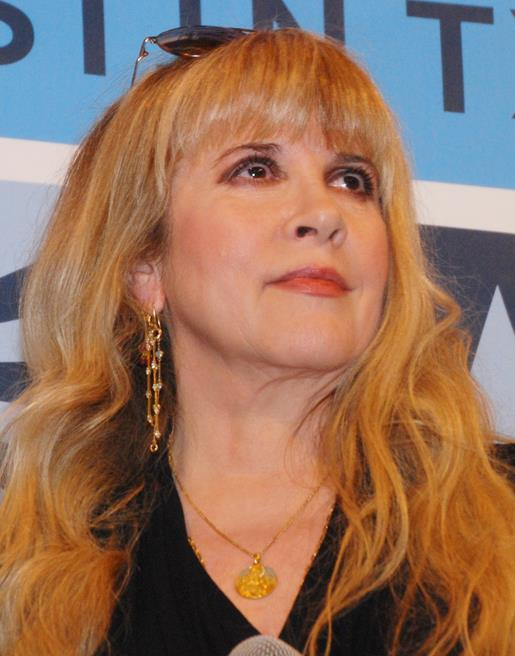
Stevie Nicks

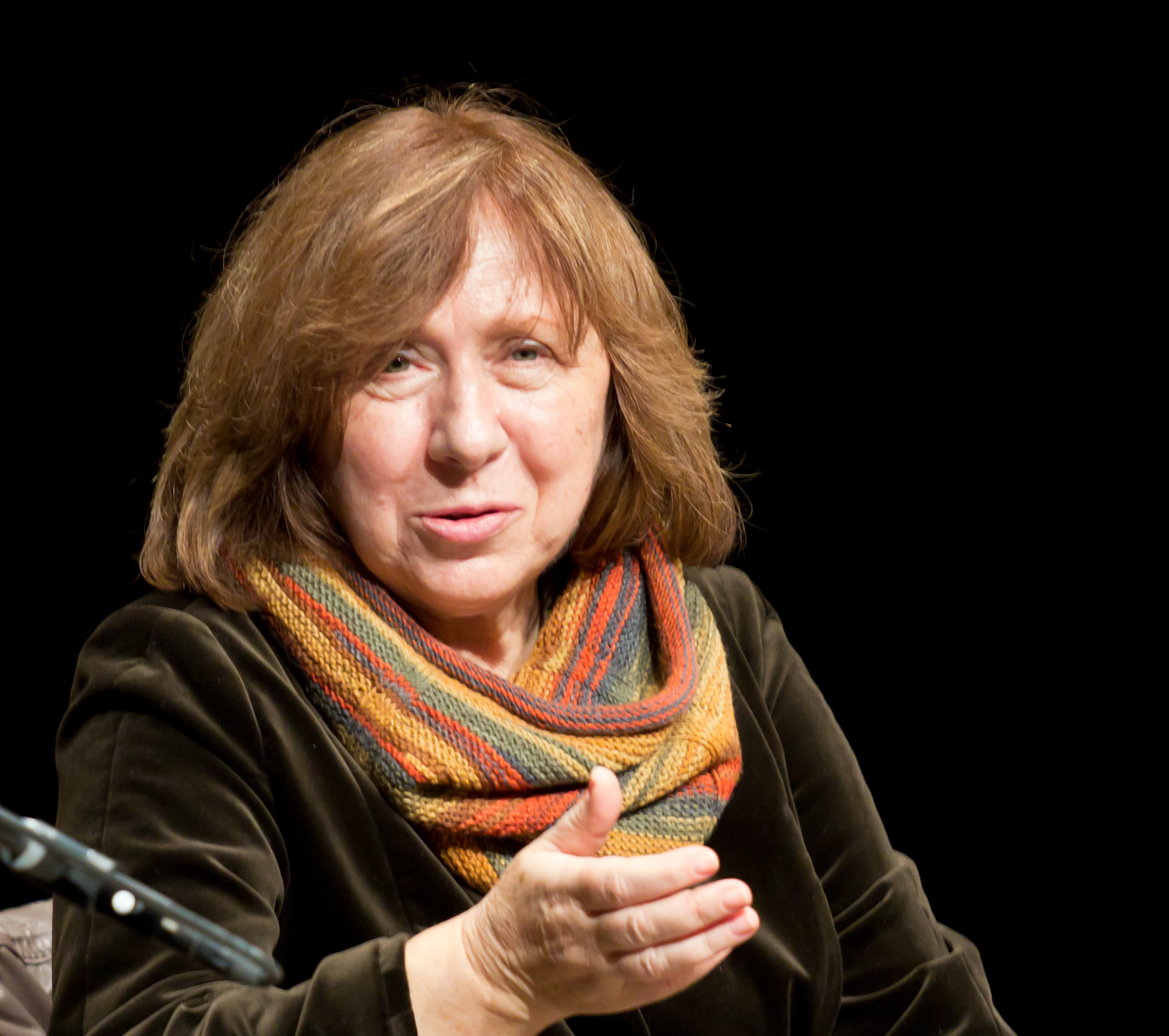
Svetlana Alexievich

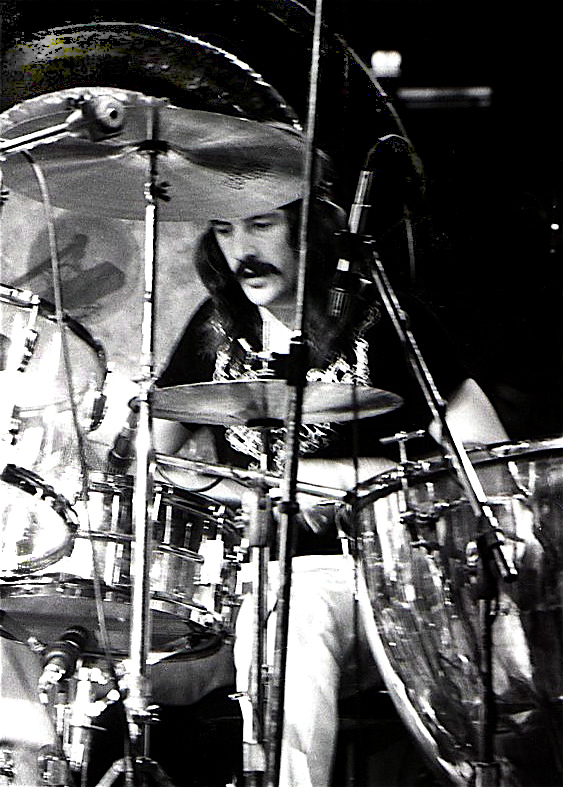
John Bonham

- May 2
  - Vladimir Matorin, Russian opera singer
  - Larry Gatlin, American singer, songwriter
- May 3
  - William H. Miller, American maritime historian
  - Chris Mulkey, American actor
- May 4
  - Jan Kantůrek, Czech translator (d. 2018)
  - Tanya Falan, American singer
  - King George Tupou V of Tonga (d. 2012)
- May 5
  - Joe Esposito, American singer, songwriter
  - Richard Pacheco, American pornographic actor
  - Bill Ward, English rock drummer
- May 7 – Susan Atkins, convicted murderer and ex-follower of Charles Manson (d. 2009)
- May 8
  - Dame Felicity Lott, English soprano
  - Stephen Stohn, Canadian television producer
- May 9
  - Steven W. Mosher, American social scientist, author
  - Calvin Murphy, American basketball player, analyst
- May 10 – Meg Foster, American actress
- May 11
  - Pam Ferris, Welsh actress
  - Shigeru Izumiya, Japanese musician
- May 12
  - Steve Winwood, English rock singer ("Higher Love")
  - Lindsay Crouse, American actress
- May 14 – Bob Woolmer, Indian-born English cricket coach (d. 2007)
- May 15
  - Yutaka Enatsu, Japanese professional baseball pitcher
  - Brian Eno, English musician, record producer
- May 16 – Jesper Christensen, Danish actor
- May 17 – Penny DeHaven, American country singer (d. 2014)
- May 18
  - Olivia Harrison, American author and film producer
  - Mikko Heiniö, Finnish composer
- May 19 – Grace Jones, Jamaican singer, actress
- May 20 – Tesshō Genda, Japanese voice actor
- May 21
  - D'Jamin Bartlett, American musical theatre actress
  - Elizabeth Buchan, English writer
  - Jonathan Hyde, Australian-born English actor
  - Carol Potter, American actress
  - Leo Sayer, English rock musician ("When I Need You")
- May 23 – Gary McCord, American professional golfer
- May 25 – Klaus Meine, German singer (Scorpions)
- May 26
  - Dayle Haddon, Canadian model, actress (d. 2024)
  - Stevie Nicks, American rock singer, songwriter (Fleetwood Mac)
- May 27 – Wubbo de Boer, Dutch civil servant
- May 29 – Michael Berkeley, English composer
- May 30 – Paul L. Schechter, American astronomer and cosmologist
- May 31
  - Svetlana Alexievich, Belarusian writer of literary reportage, Nobel Prize laureate
  - Lynda Bellingham, English actress, broadcaster and author (d. 2014)
  - John Bonham, English rock drummer (Led Zeppelin) (d. 1980)

=== June ===
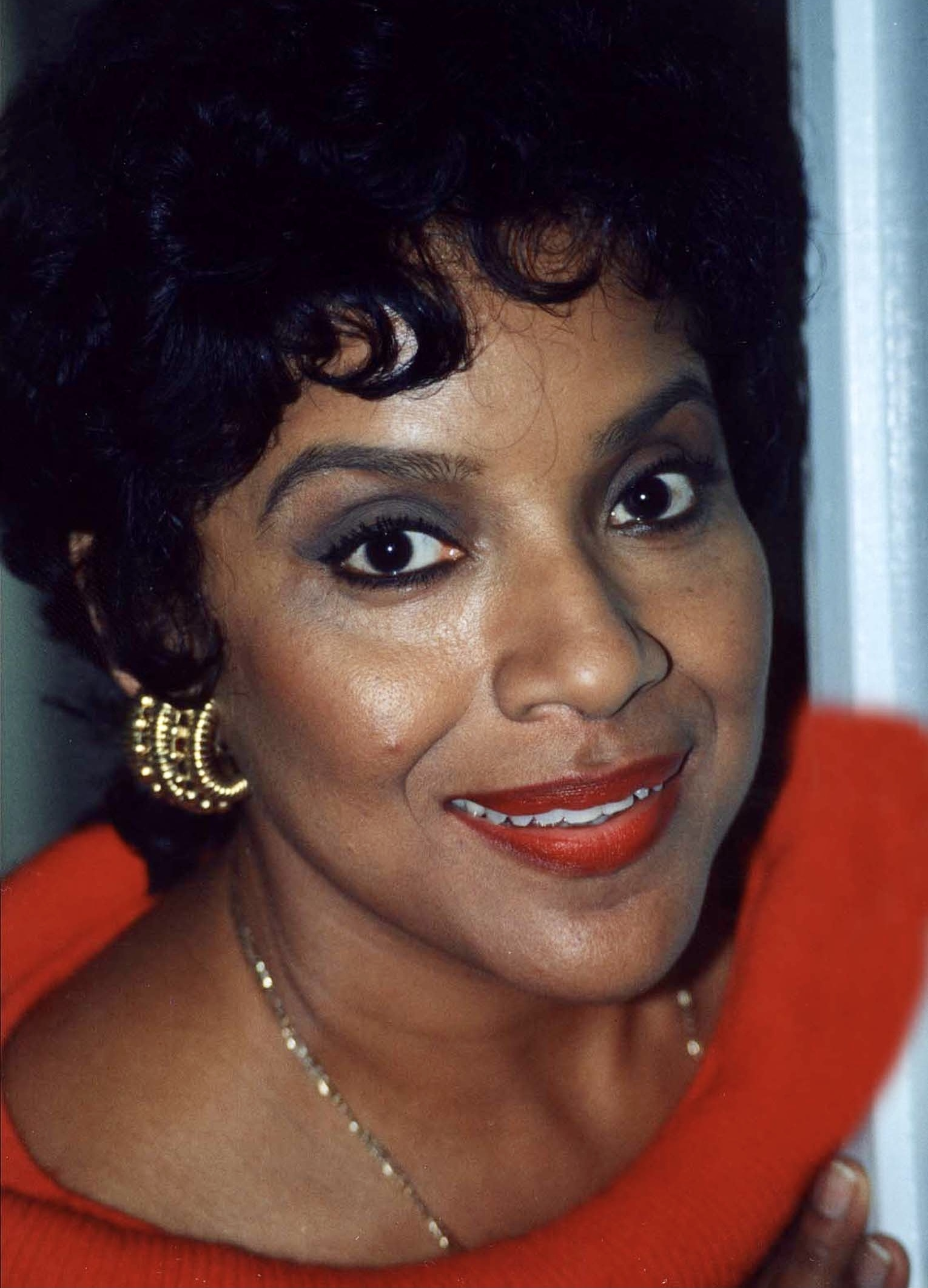
Phylicia Rashad

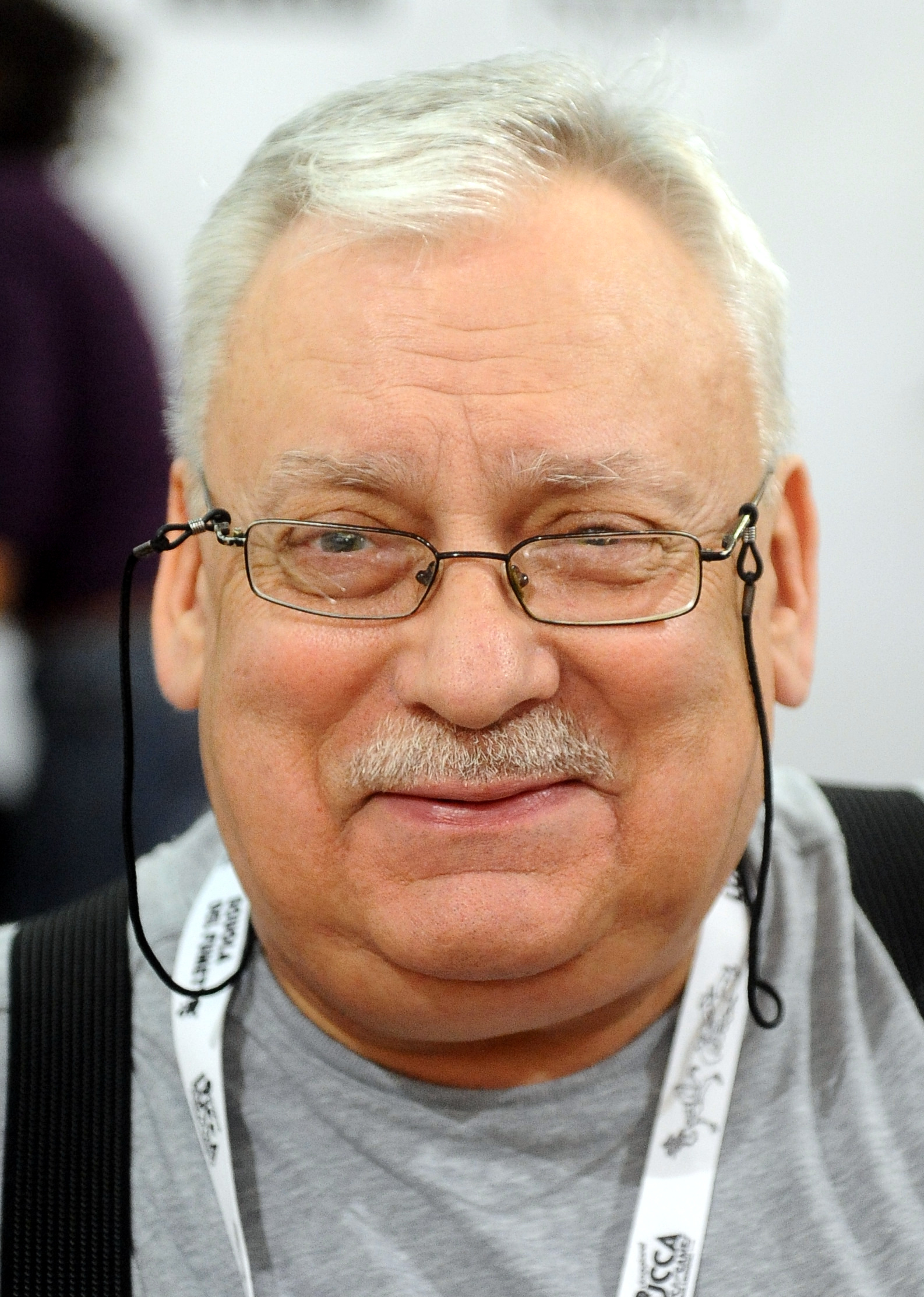
Andrzej Sapkowski

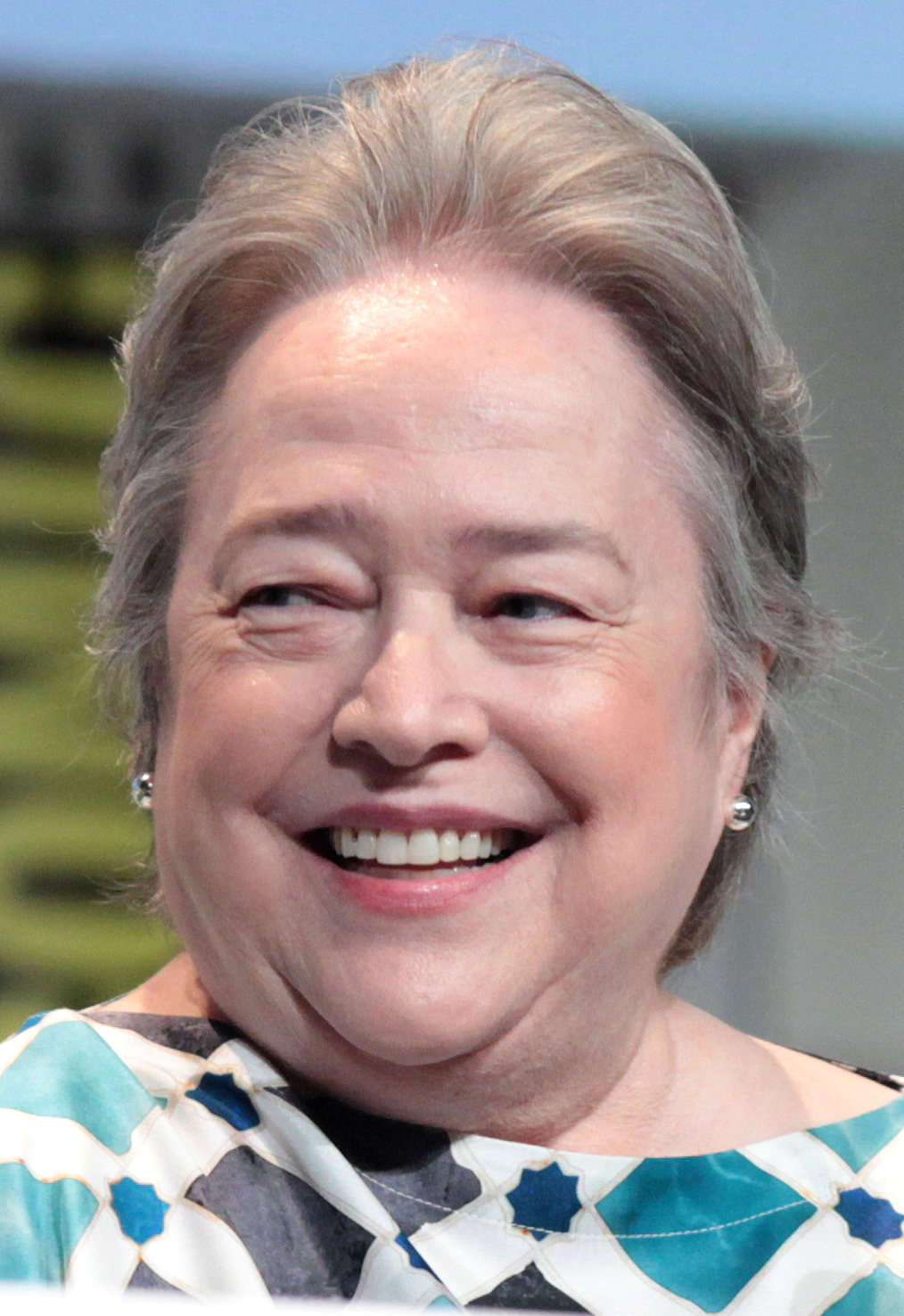
Kathy Bates

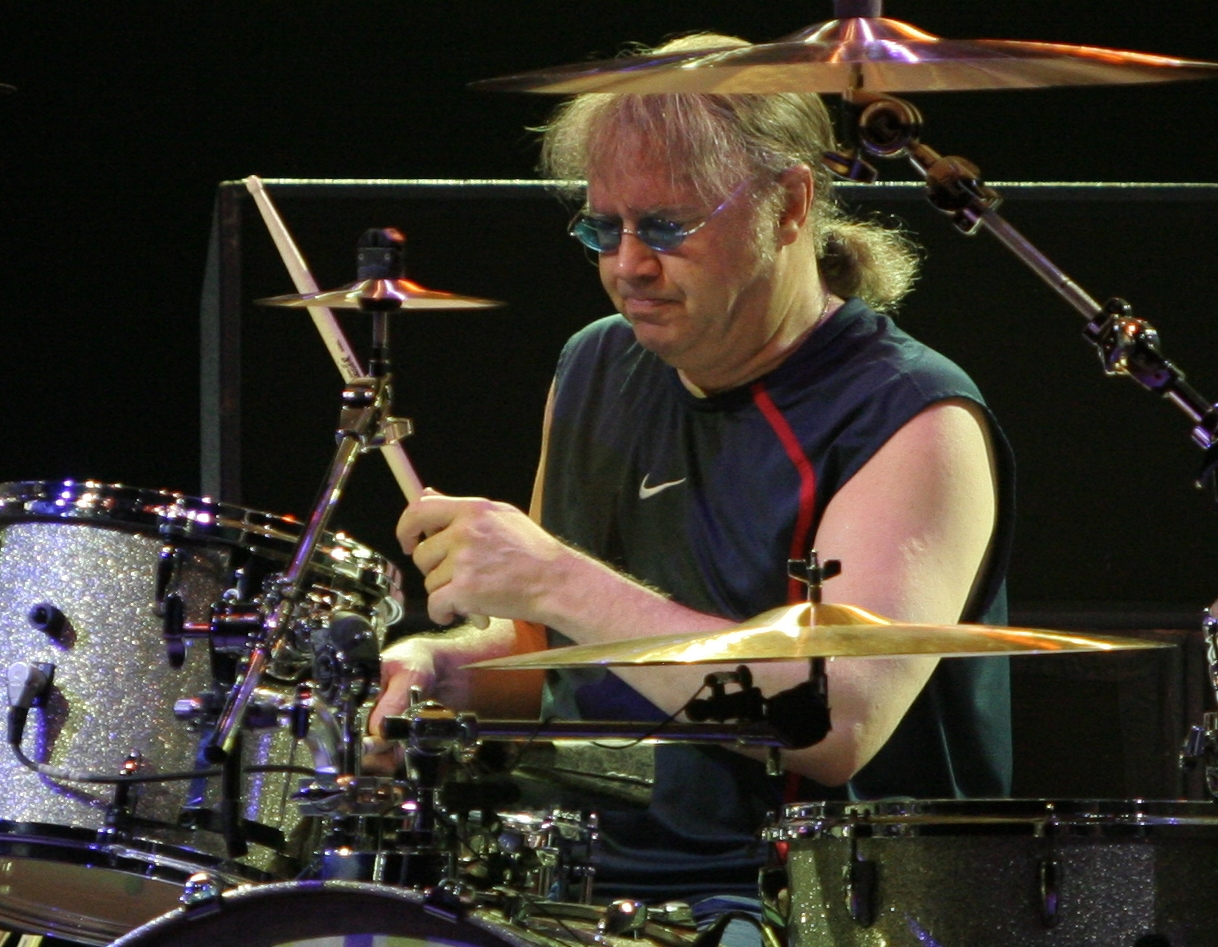
Ian Paice

- June 1
  - Powers Boothe, American actor (Guyana Tragedy: The Story of Jim Jones) (d. 2017)
  - Tom Sneva, American race car driver, Indianapolis 500 winner
- June 2 – Jerry Mathers, American actor (Leave It to Beaver)
- June 3 – Carlos Franzetti, Argentine composer and arranger
- June 4
  - Bob Champion, English jump jockey
  - David Haskell, American actor (d. 2000)
- June 6 – Richard Sinclair, English musician (Caravan)
- June 7 – Jim C. Walton, American business person, (Walmart)
- June 8
  - Jürgen von der Lippe, German television presenter, actor and comedian
  - Jad Azkoul, Lebanese-American classical guitarist
- June 9
  - Gudrun Schyman, Swedish politician
  - Gary Thorne, American play-by-play announcer
- June 10 – Subrata Roy, Indian businessman (d. 2023)
- June 11 – Dave Cash, American baseball player
- June 12 – Sadegh Zibakalam, Iranian academic reformist
- June 13 – Garnet Bailey, Canadian hockey player, scout (d. 2001)
- June 14 – Laurence Yep, American author
- June 15 – Paul Michiels, Belgian singer, songwriter
- June 16 – Terry Schofield, American basketball player
- June 17 – Dave Concepción, Venezuelan baseball player
- June 18 – Sherry Turkle, American science/social studies professor
  - Eliezer Halfin, Israeli wrestler (d. 1972)
- June 19
  - Nick Drake, English musician (d. 1974)
  - Lea Laven, Finnish singer
  - Phylicia Rashad, African-American actress (The Cosby Show)
- June 20
  - Véronique de Montchalin, French politician
  - Diana Mara Henry, American freelance photojournalist
  - Alan Longmuir, Scottish musician (d. 2018)
  - Ludwig Scotty, President of Nauru (d. 2026)
  - Tina Sinatra, American singer, actress, film producer and memoirist
- June 21
  - Don Airey, British musician
  - Lionel Rose, Australian boxer (d. 2011)
  - Jovan Aćimović, Serbian football player
  - Raffaello Martinelli, Italian prelate
  - Philippe Sarde, French film composer
  - Andrzej Sapkowski, Polish writer
  - Wolfgang Seel, German football player
  - Greg Hyder, American professional basketball player
- June 22
  - Takashi Sasano, Japanese actor
  - Shōhaku Okumura, Japanese Soto Zen
  - Peter Prijdekker, Dutch swimmer
  - Sue Roberts, American professional golfer
  - Todd Rundgren, American rock singer, record producer (Hello It's Me)
  - Curtis Johnson, American football cornerback
  - Franciszek Smuda, Polish football coach
  - Panagiotis Xanthakos, Greek sports shoote
  - Colin Waldron, English football defender
- June 23
  - Larry Coker, American football player, coach
  - Jim Heacock, American defensive coordinator
  - Luther Kent, American blues singer
- June 24
  - Stephen Martin, Australian politician, senior academic and rugby league referee
  - Patrick Moraz, Swiss keyboard player
  - Janet Museveni, First Lady of Uganda
  - Dave Orchard, South African cricketer
  - Eigil Sørensen, Danish cyclist
  - Jürgen Stars, German footballer
  - Jenny Wood, Zimbabwean swimmer
- June 25
  - Kenn George, American businessman
  - Michael Lembeck, American actor, television and film director
  - Tom Rideout, Canadian politician
- June 26
  - David Vaughan, Welsh professional golfer
  - John Pratt, English professional footballer
  - Pablo Anaya Rivera, Mexican politician
- June 27
  - Vennira Aadai Nirmala, Tamil actress
  - Michael J. Barrett, Guamanian politician
  - Camile Baudoin, American rock guitarist
- June 28
  - Deborah Moggach, English writer
  - Kathy Bates, American actress (Misery)
  - Jimmy Thomson, Scottish professional footballer
  - Brian Rowan, Scottish professional footballer
- June 29
  - Danny Adcock, Australian actor
  - Vic Brooks, English cricketer
  - Leo Burke, Canadian professional wrestler
  - Fred Grandy, American actor, politician (The Love Boat)
  - Helge Karlsen, Norwegian football player
  - Ian Paice, English musician (Deep Purple)
  - Usha Prashar, Baroness Prashar, crossbench member of the House of Lords
- June 30
  - Alice Wong, Canadian politician
  - Dag Fornæss, Norwegian speed skater
  - Peter Rossborough, English rugby union international
  - Galarrwuy Yunupingu, Australian Indigenous community leader (d. 2023)
  - Vladimir Yakunin, Russian official, head of state-run Russian Railways Company
  - Raymond Leo Burke, American cardinal, prelate

=== July ===
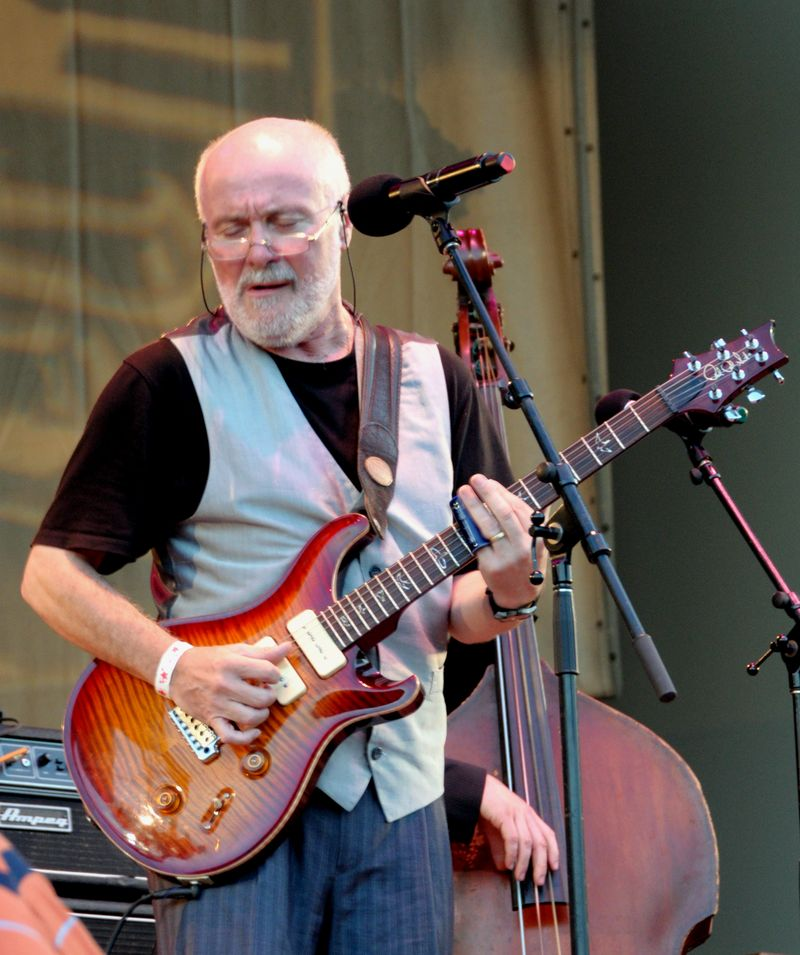
Jeremy Spencer

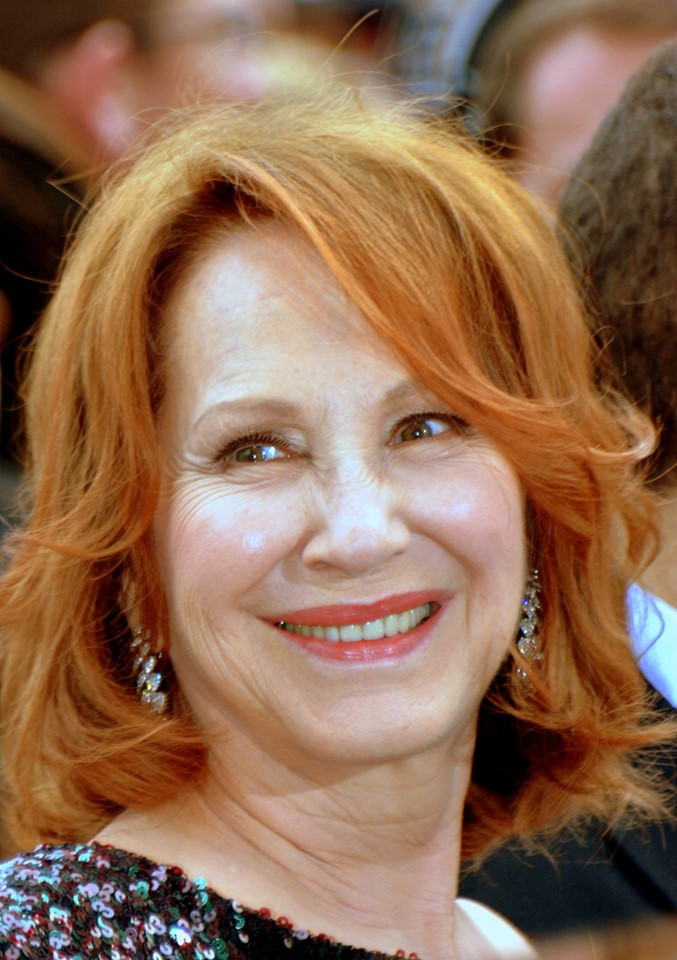
Nathalie Baye

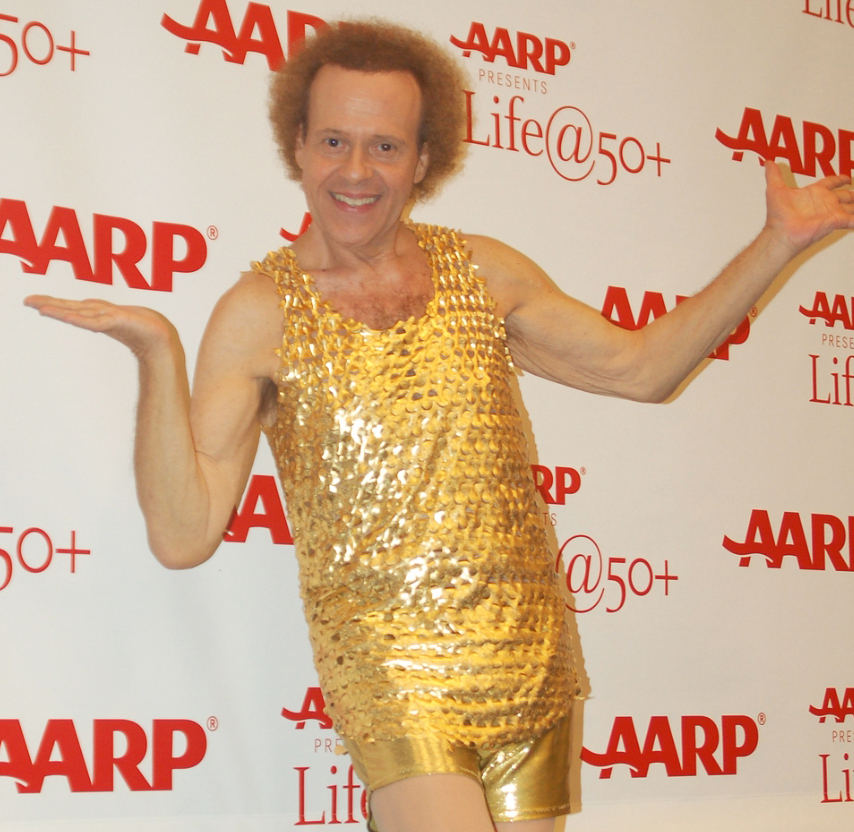
Richard Simmons

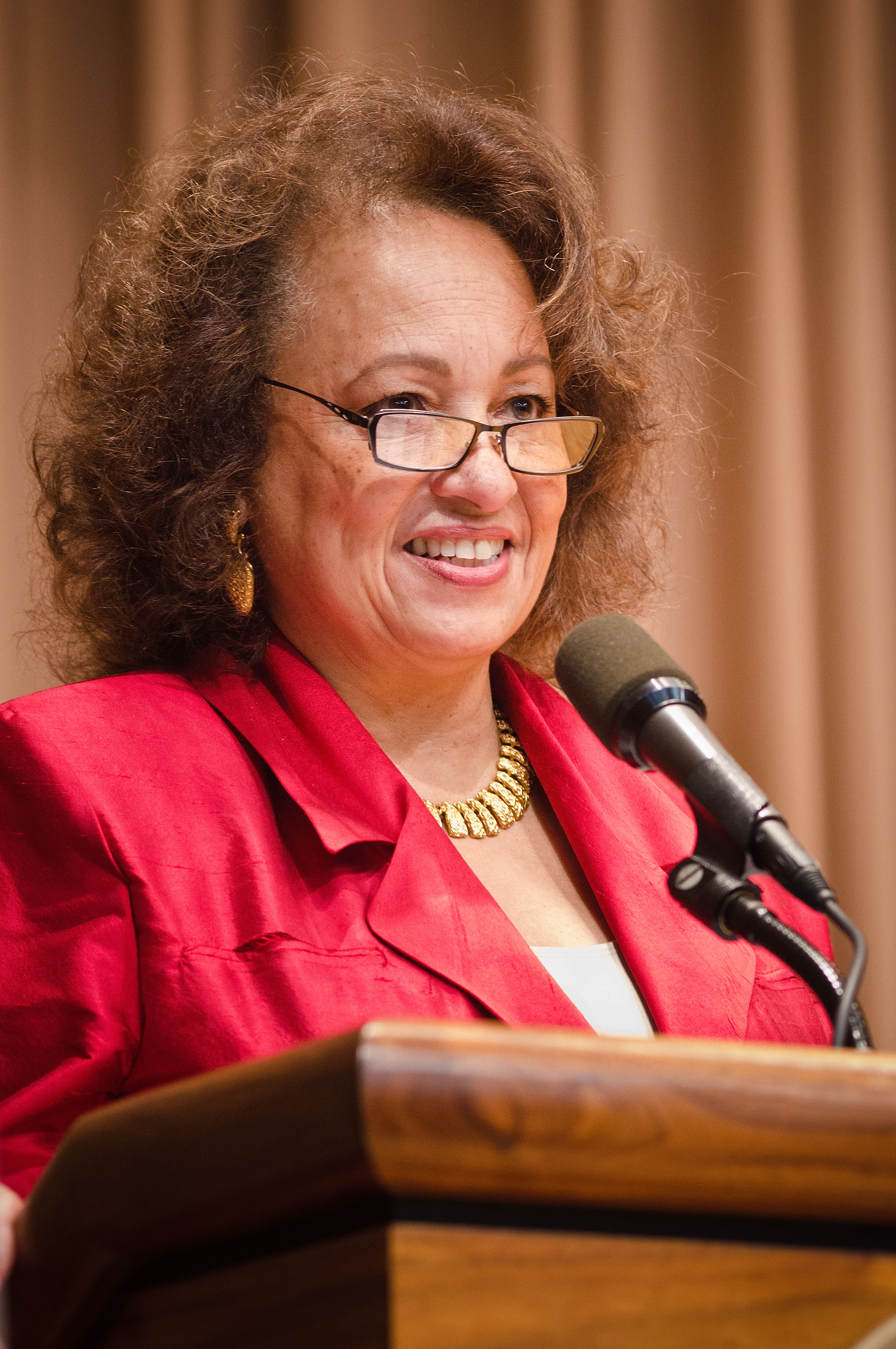
Daphne Maxwell Reid

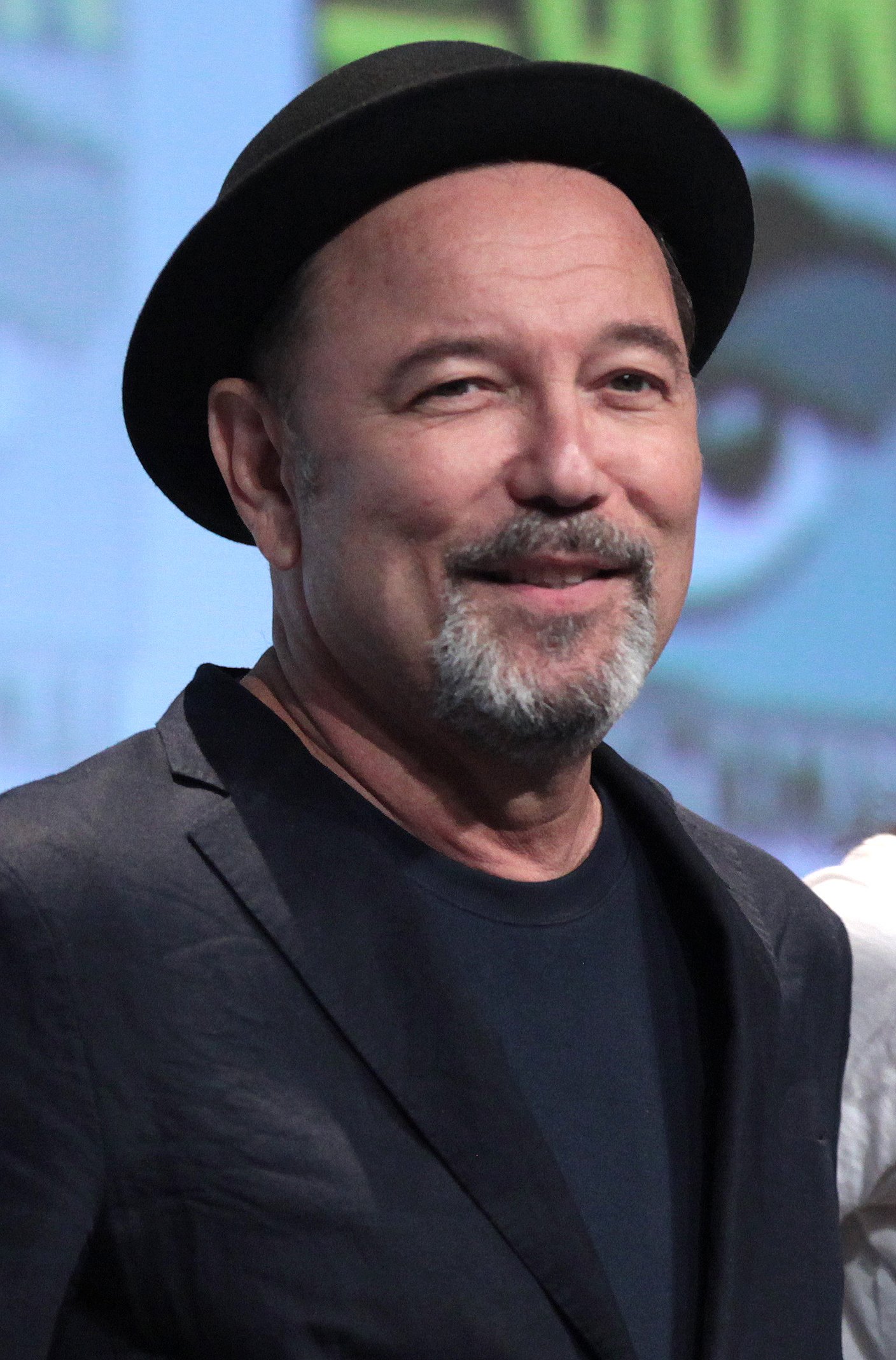
Rubén Blades

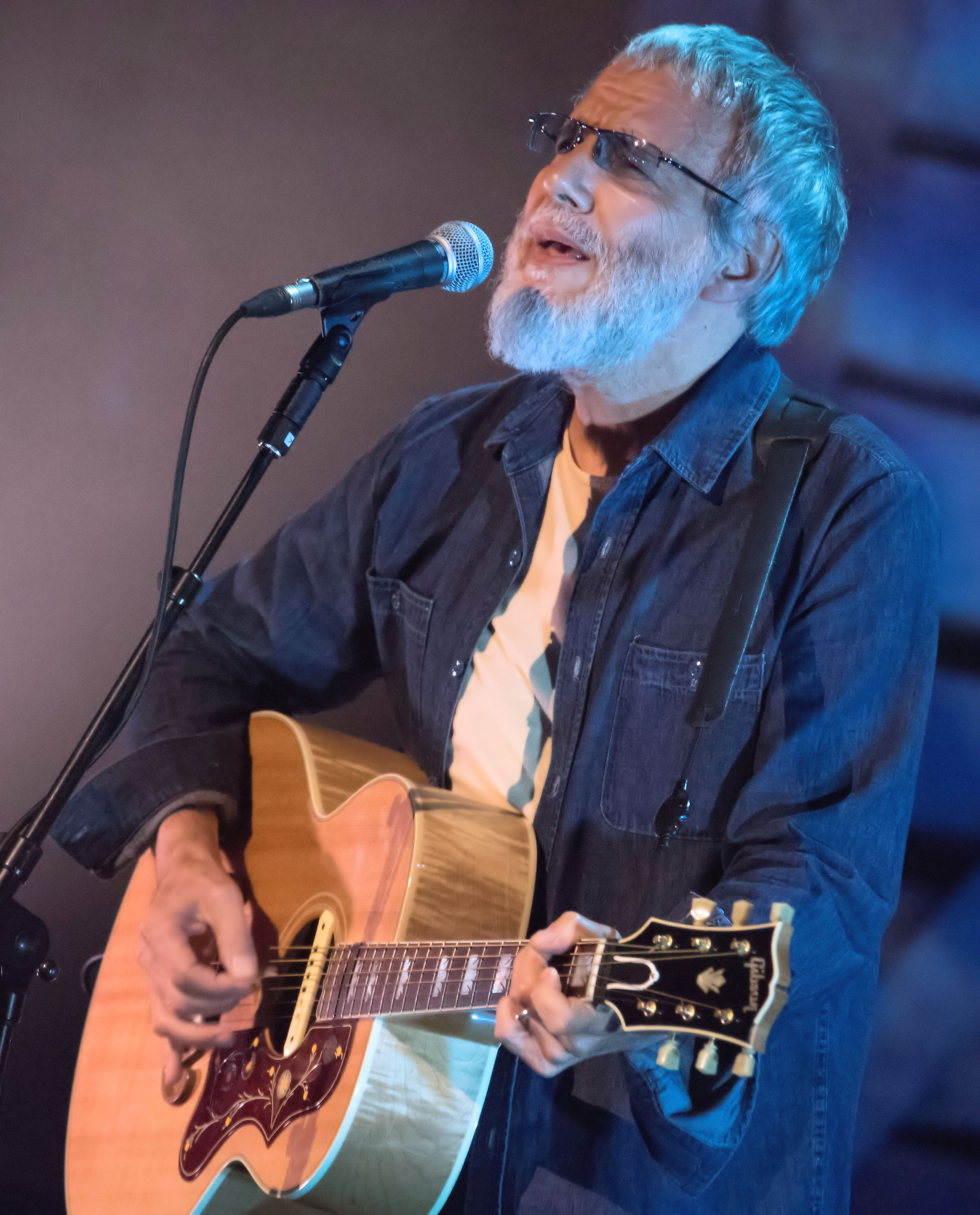
Cat Stevens

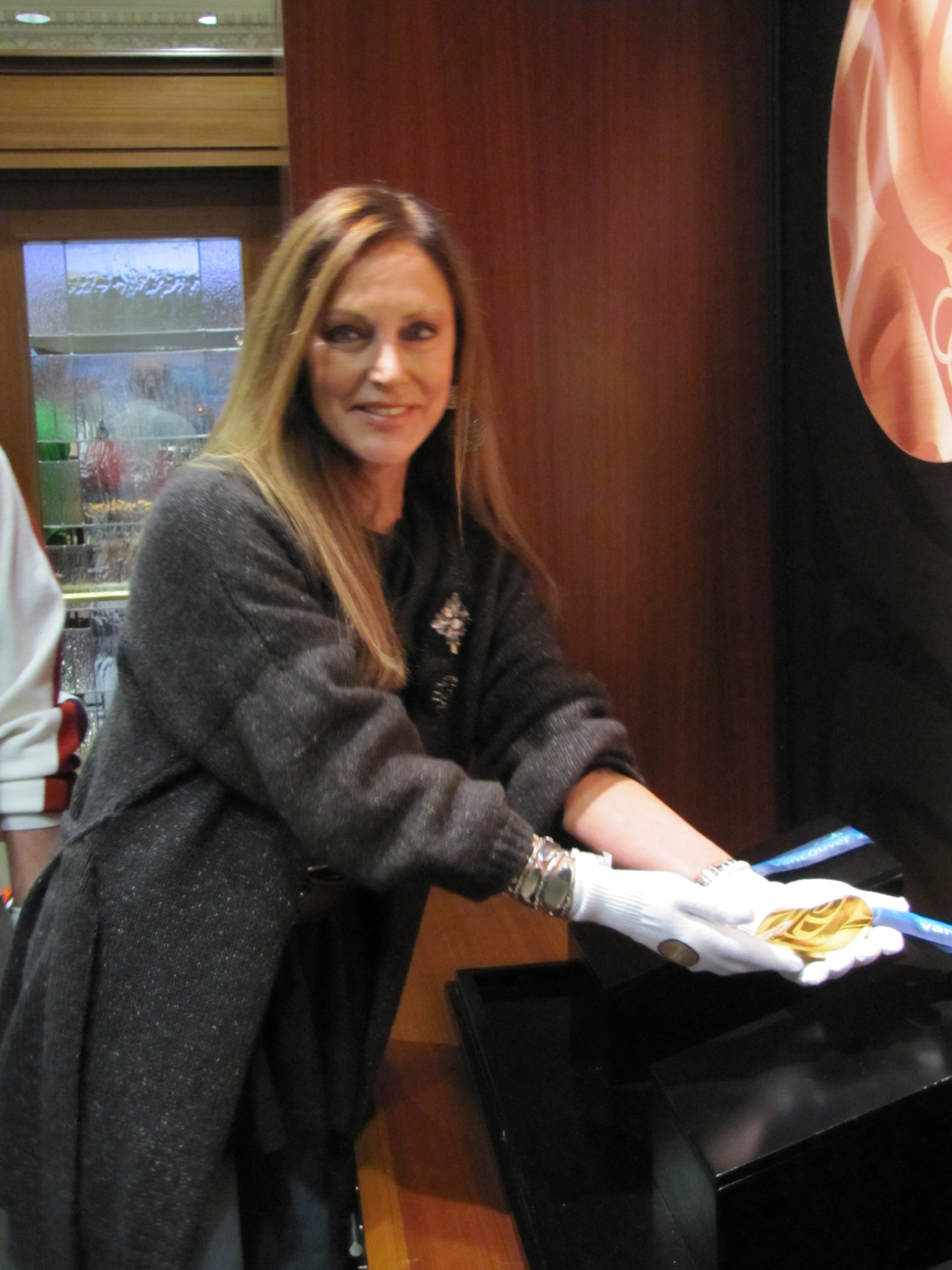
Peggy Fleming

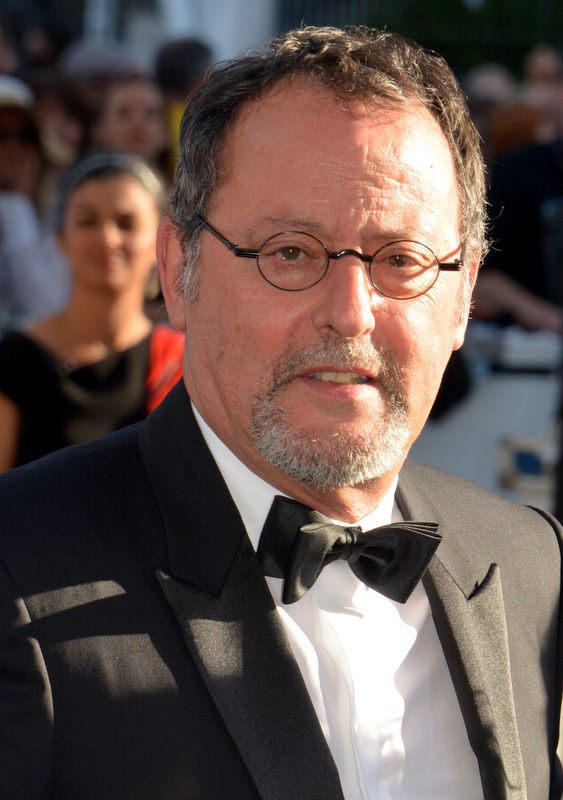
Jean Reno

- July 1
  - Ever Hugo Almeida, Paraguayan footballer
  - Hap Farber, American football linebacker.
  - John Ford, English-born rock musician (Strawbs), writer of Part of the Union
  - Michael McGimpsey, Northern Ireland politician
- July 2
  - Mario Villanueva, Mexican politician
  - Saul Rubinek, German-Canadian character actor, director, producer and playwright
- July 3 – Tarmo Koivisto, Finnish comics artist
- July 4
  - René Arnoux, French racing driver
  - Louis Raphaël I Sako, Head of the Chaldean Catholic Church
  - Ed Armbrister, Bahamian Major League Baseball outfielder
  - Nazmul Hussain, Indian first-class cricketer
  - Jeremy Spencer, British musician
- July 5
  - Tony DeMeo, American football coach, player
  - Dave Lemonds, American baseball player
  - Salomon Juan Marcos Issa, Mexican politician
  - Lojze Peterle, Slovenian politician
  - William Hootkins, American actor (d. 2005)
- July 6
  - Nathalie Baye, French actress
  - Jeff Webb, American professional basketball player
  - Arnaldo Baptista, Brazilian rock musician, composer
  - Brad Park, Canadian NHL Defenseman
  - Sid Smith, American football offensive lineman
  - Eiko Segawa, Japanese female enka singer, actress
  - Jan van der Veen, Dutch professional association football player
- July 7
  - Jerry Sherk, American football defensive tackle
  - Jean LeClerc, Québécois actor
  - Jean-Marie Colombani, French journalist
  - Tan Lee Meng, Singaporean jurist
  - Stuart Varney, British-American economic consultant
  - Luis Estrada, Mexican football league forward, Olympic athlete
- July 8 – Raffi, Egyptian-born children's entertainer
- July 10
  - Theo Bücker, German football manager, player
  - Mick Coop, English professional football right back
  - Rich Hand, American professional baseball player
- July 12
  - Richard Simmons, American television personality, fitness expert (d. 2024)
  - Jay Thomas, American actor (d. 2017)
- July 13
  - Alf Hansen, Norwegian rower
  - Daphne Maxwell Reid, African-American actress
  - Don Sweet, Canadian star football kicker
  - Robert A. Underwood, Guamanian politician, educator
- July 14 – Goodwill Zwelithini kaBhekuzulu, Zulu king (d. 2021)
- July 15
  - Enriqueta Basilio, Mexican track and field athlete (d. 2019)
  - Richard Franklin, Australian film director (d. 2007)
  - Twinkle, English singer, songwriter (d. 2015)
- July 16
  - Rubén Blades, Panamanian singer, actor and musician
  - Rita Barberá, Spanish politician, Mayor of Valencia (d. 2016)
  - Lars Lagerbäck, Swedish football manager, player
  - Jeff Van Wagenen, American professional golfer
  - Pinchas Zukerman, Israeli violinist
- July 17
  - Doug Berry, American Canadian football coach
  - Alan Sieler, Australian cricketer
- July 18 – Hartmut Michel, German chemist, Nobel Prize laureate
- July 20
  - Muse Watson, American actor
  - Maroun Elias Nimeh Lahham, Archbishop of the Roman Catholic Archdiocese of Tunis
- July 21
  - Beppe Grillo, Italian activist, blogger, comedian and actor
  - Ed Hinton, American sportswriter
  - Cat Stevens (b. Steven Georgiou, later known as Yusuf Islam), British singer, musician
  - Garry Trudeau, American cartoonist (Doonesbury)
  - Teruzane Utada, Japanese music executive producer, attendant
  - Mikhail Zadornov, Russian stand-up comedian, writer
  - Snooty, male Florida manatee (d. 2017)
  - Anders Berglund, Swedish arranger/composer, conductor and producer
- July 22
  - Susan Eloise Hinton, American author
  - Otto Waalkes, German comedian, actor
- July 23 – John Cushnahan, Northern Irish politician
- July 25
  - Steve Goodman, American Grammy Award-winning folk music singer, songwriter (d. 1984)
  - Tony Cline, American football player (d. 2018)
- July 27 – Peggy Fleming, American figure skater
- July 28
  - Gerald Casale, American director, singer (Devo)\
  - Georgia Engel, American actress (d. 2019)
- July 29
  - Meir Shalev Israeli writer and newspaper columnist for the daily Yedioth Ahronoth. Shalev's books have been translated into 26 languages (d.2023)
- July 30
  - Jean Reno, French actor
  - Julia Tsenova, Bulgarian composer, musician (d. 2010)
- July 31 – Jonathan Dollimore, English academic sociologist, cultural theorist

=== August ===
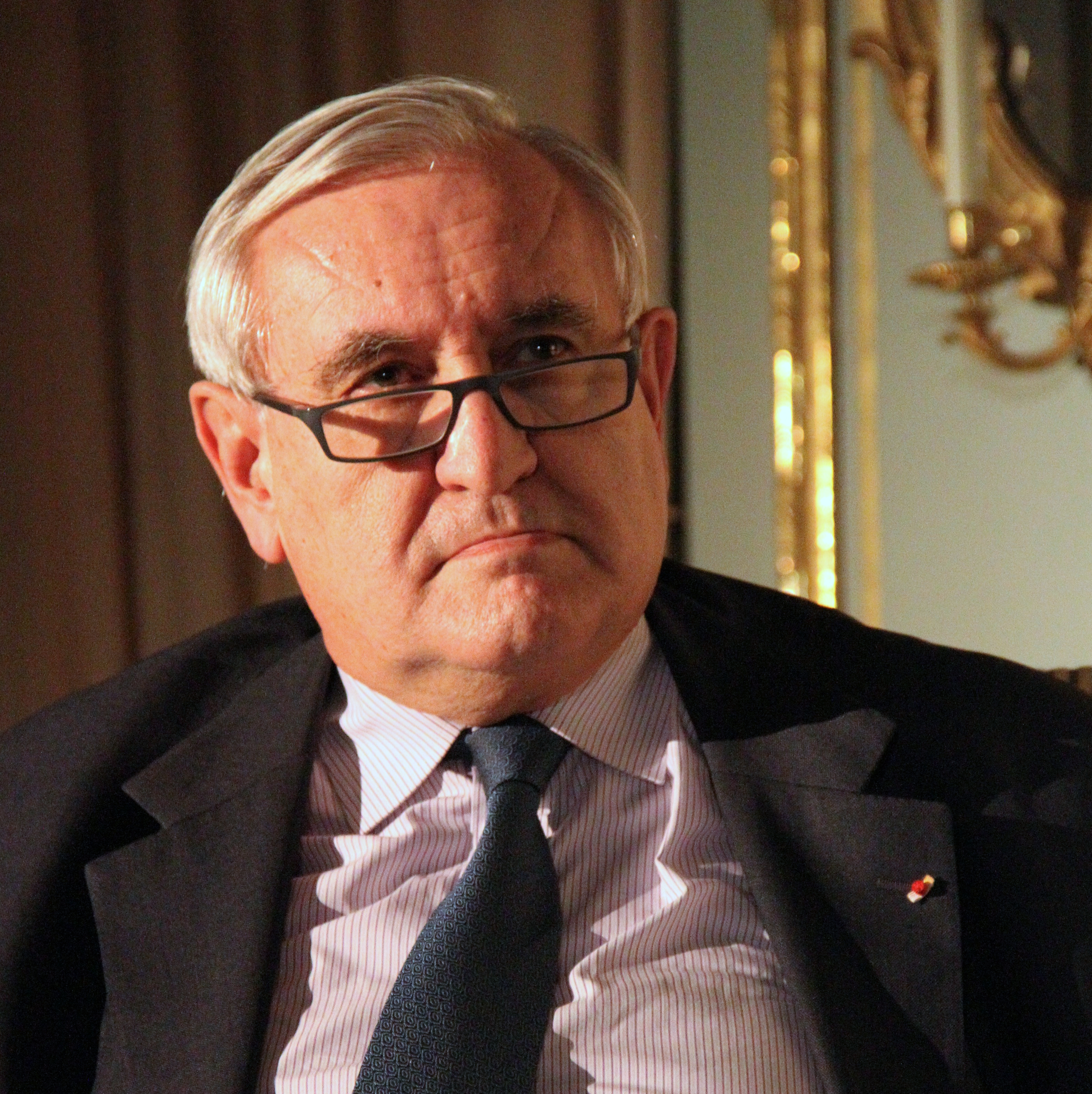
Jean-Pierre Raffarin

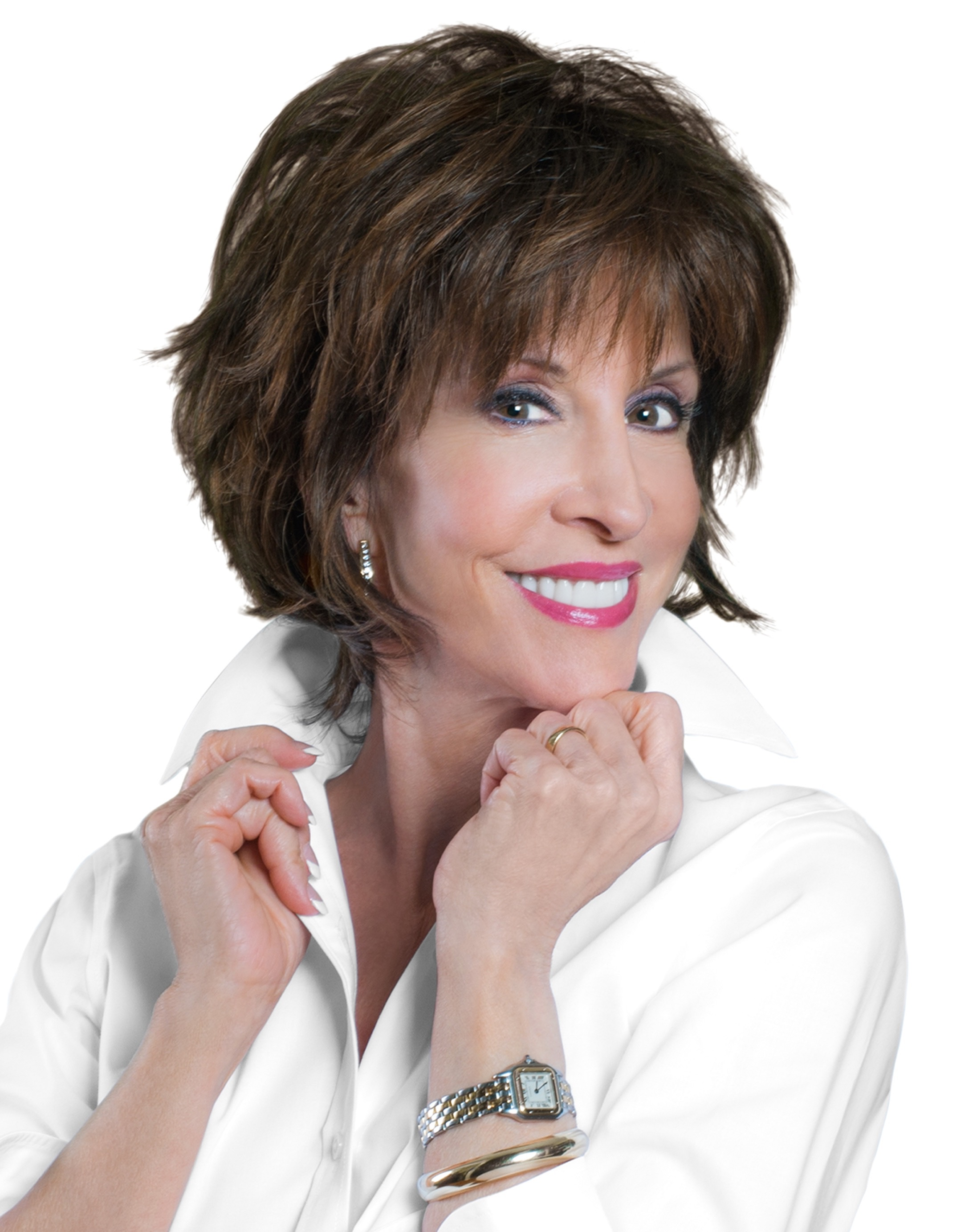
Deana Martin

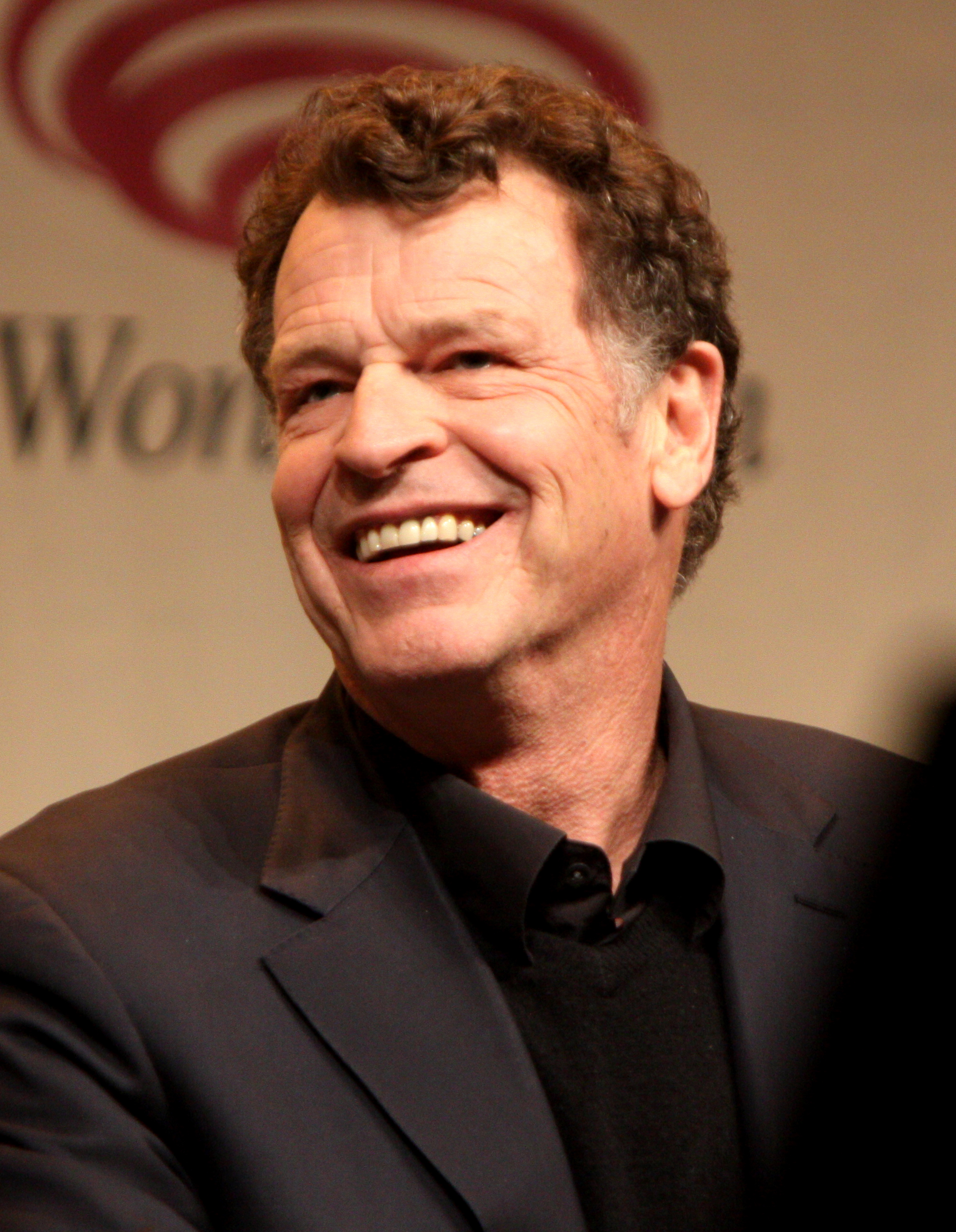
John Noble

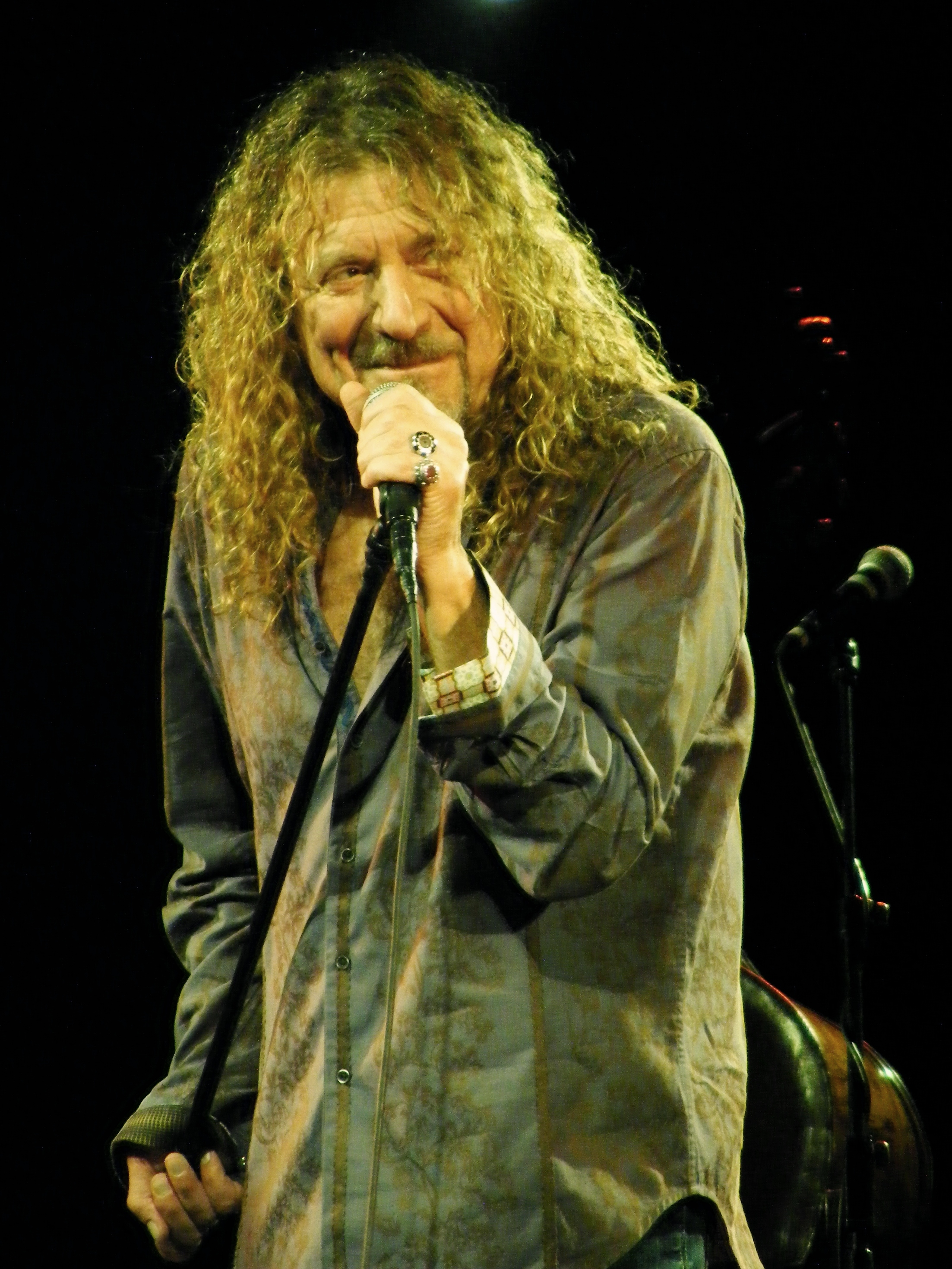
Robert Plant

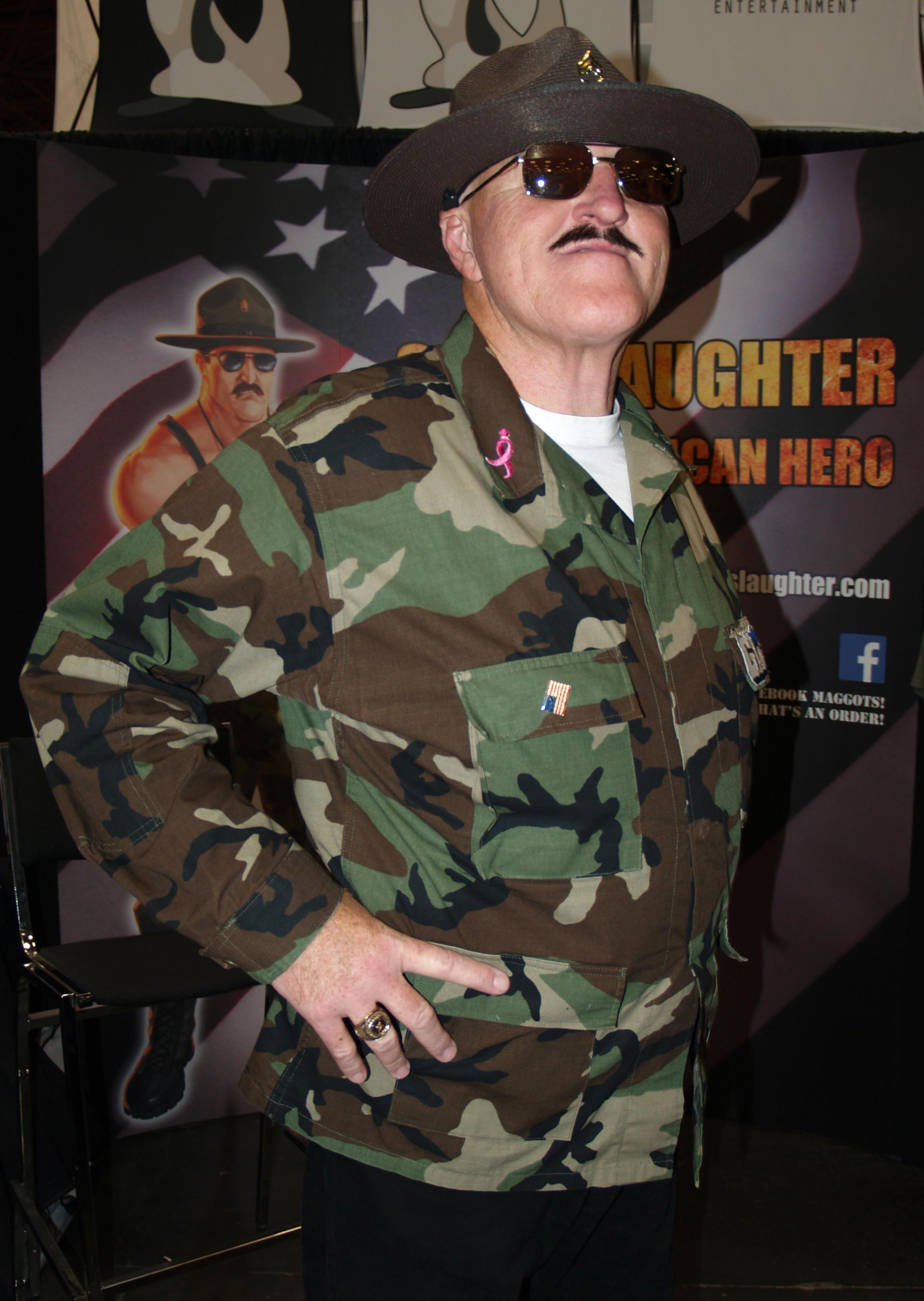
Sgt. Slaughter

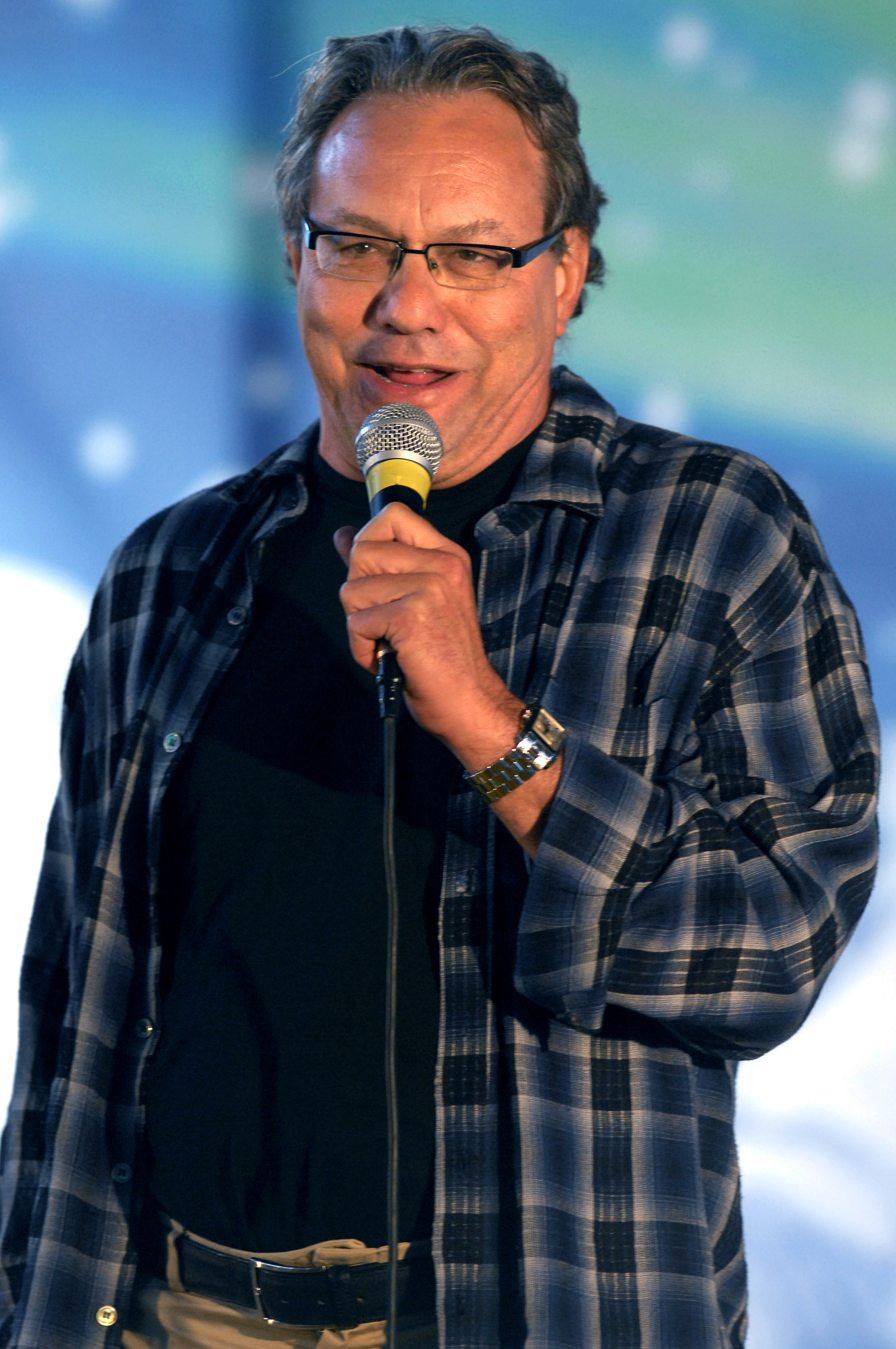
Lewis Black

- August 2
  - Dennis Prager, American radio talk show host, author
  - Bob Rae, Canadian politician
- August 3 – Jean-Pierre Raffarin, Prime Minister of France
- August 4 – Giorgio Parisi, Italian theoretical physicist and Nobel Prize laureate
- August 7 – James P. Allison, American immunologist, recipient of the Nobel Prize in Physiology or Medicine
- August 8 – Wincey Willis, British broadcaster (d. 2024)
- August 12 – Mizengo Pinda, 9th Prime Minister of Tanzania
- August 13 – Kathleen Battle, African-American soprano
- August 14 – Joseph Marcell, English actor
- August 15
  - Mahmoud Hashemi Shahroudi, Iranian cleric, politician (d. 2018)
  - George Ryton, Singapore-born English Formula One engineer
- August 18
  - Sean Scanlan, Scottish actor (d. 2017)
  - Robert Hughes, Australian actor
  - Deana Martin, American singer and actress
- August 20
  - John Noble, Australian actor
  - Robert Plant, English singer (Led Zeppelin)
  - Barbara Allen Rainey (b. Barbara Ann Allen), American aviator, first female pilot in the U.S. armed forces (d. 1982)
- August 21
  - Sharon M. Draper, American children's book author (Out of My Mind)
  - Peter Starkie, Australian rock guitarist (Skyhooks, Jo Jo Zep & The Falcons)
- August 22
  - David Marks, American guitarist (The Beach Boys)
  - Carolyn L. Mazloomi, American quilter and art historian
- August 23 – Lev Zeleny, Soviet, Russian physicist
- August 24
  - Jean-Michel Jarre, French electronic musician
  - Sauli Niinistö, Finnish politician, 12th President of Finland
  - Kim Sung-il, Chief of Staff of the Republic of Korea Air Force
  - Vicente Sotto III, Filipino actor, host and politician
- August 25 – Tony Ramos, Brazilian actor
- August 27 – Sgt. Slaughter, American professional wrestler
- August 30
  - Lewis Black, American comedian
  - Fred Hampton, American activist (d. 1969)
  - Victor Skumin, Russian scientist, professor
- August 31
  - Cyril Jordan, American musician
  - Holger Osieck, German football manager

=== September ===
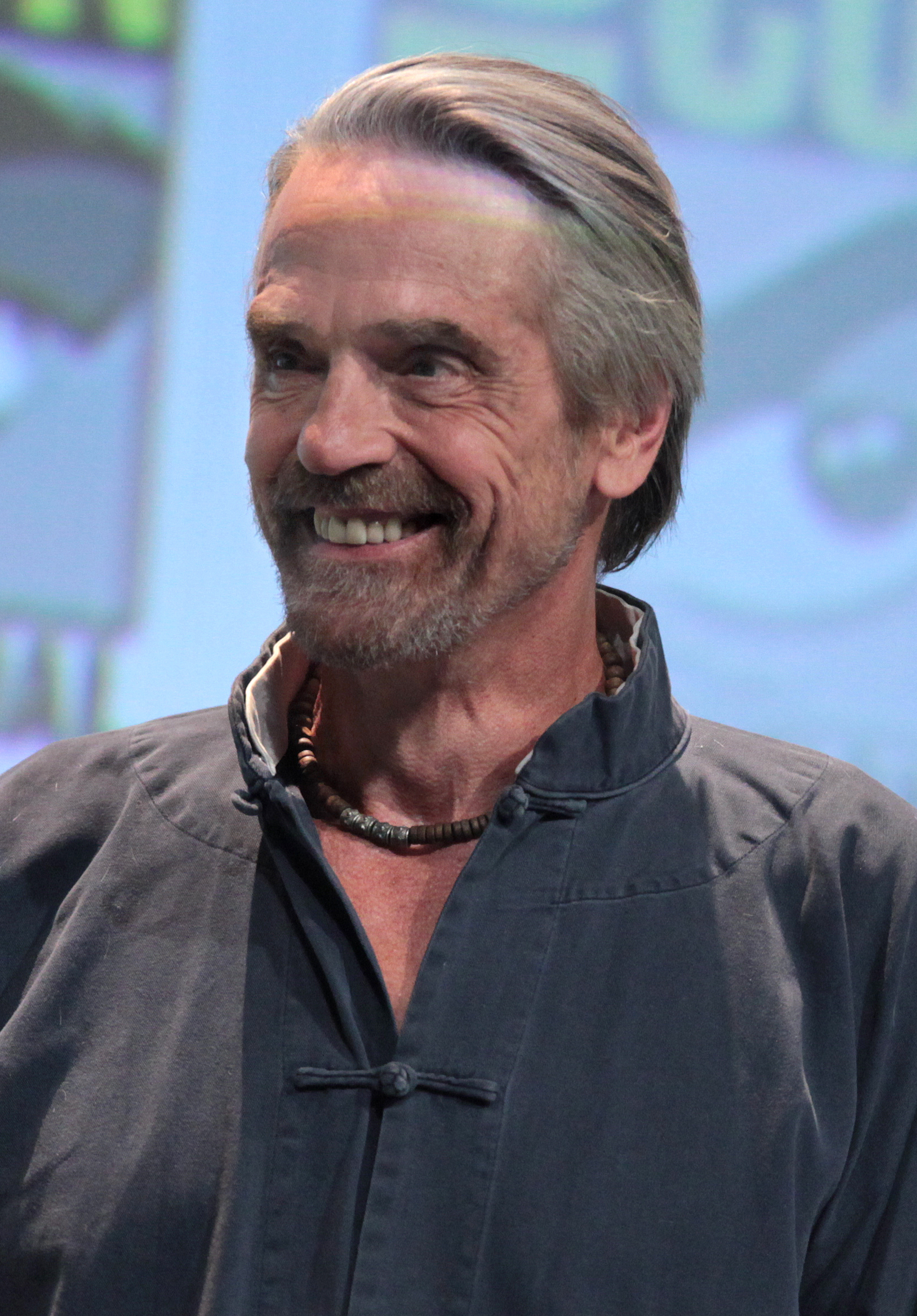
Jeremy Irons

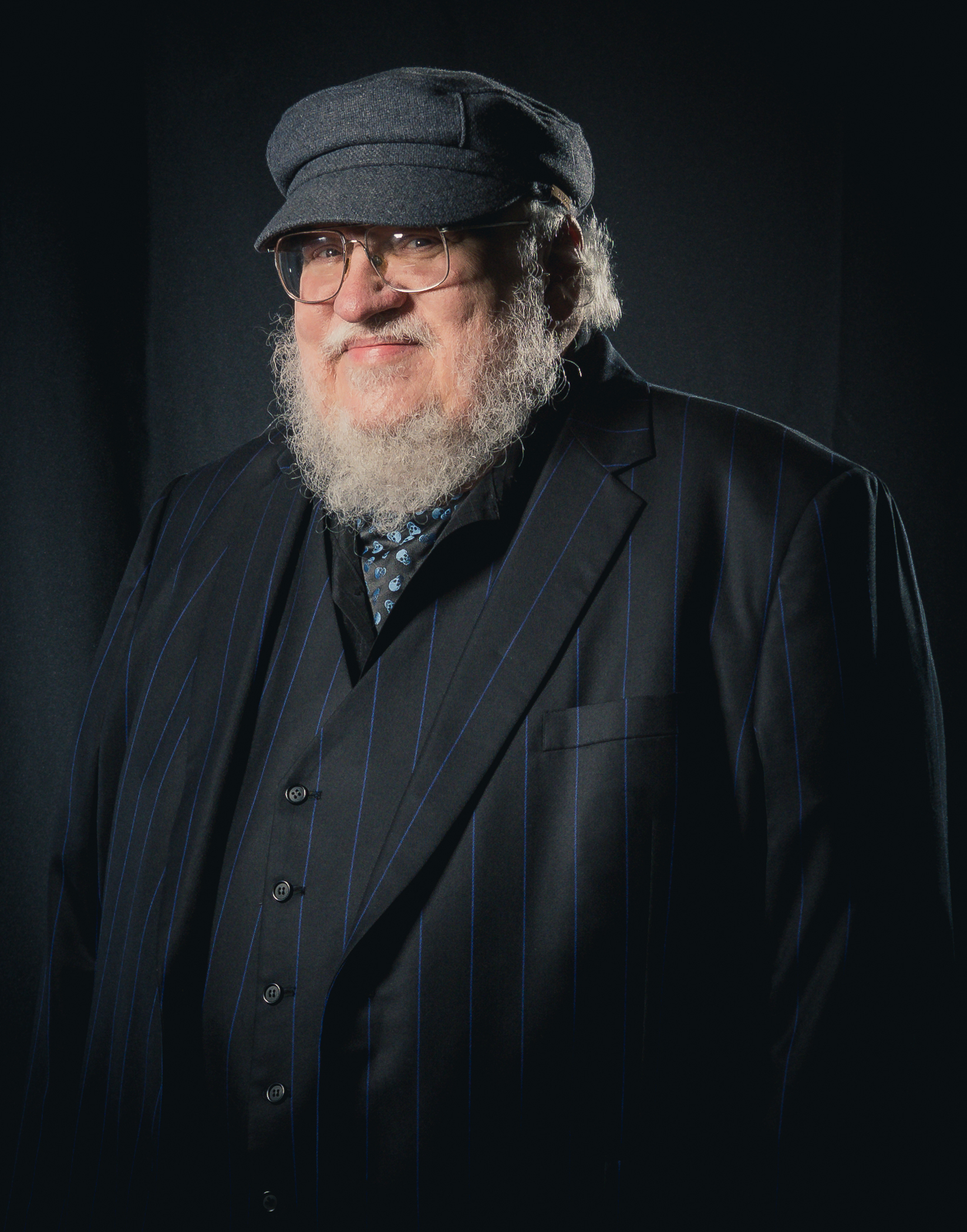
George R. R. Martin

- September 1 – James Rebhorn, American actor (d. 2014)
- September 2
  - Nate Archibald, American basketball player
  - Terry Bradshaw, American football player, sportscaster
  - Christa McAuliffe, American teacher and astronaut (d. in Space Shuttle Challenger disaster 1986)
- September 3
  - Don Brewer, American drummer (Grand Funk Railroad)
  - Levy Mwanawasa, Zambian president (d. 2008)
- September 4 – Michael Berryman, American actor
- September 5 – Benita Ferrero-Waldner, Austrian diplomat, politician
- September 6 – Sam Hui, Hong Kong singer
- September 7
  - Susan Blakely, American actress
  - Khalifa bin Zayed Al Nahyan, ruler of Abu Dhabi (d. 2022)
- September 8 – The Great Kabuki, Japanese professional wrestler
- September 10
  - Judy Geeson, English actress
  - Bob Lanier, American basketball player (d. 2022)
  - Margaret Trudeau (b. Margaret Sinclair), wife and mother of Prime Ministers of Canada
  - Charlie Waters, American football player
- September 11 – John Martyn (b. Iain McGeachy), British folk-rock guitarist (d. 2009)
- September 12 – Mah Bow Tan, Singaporean politician
- September 13
  - Nell Carter, African-American singer, actress (Gimme a Break!) (d. 2003)
  - Sitiveni Rabuka, 3rd Prime Minister of Fiji
  - Kathleen Lloyd, American actress
- September 16 – Ron Blair, American rock bassist (Tom Petty and the Heartbreakers)
- September 17
  - Aidan Nichols, English Dominican priest and academic
  - John Ritter, American actor (Three's Company) (d. 2003)
- September 18 – Jean-Louis Pichon, French actor
- September 19
  - Jeremy Irons, English actor
  - Nadiya Tkachenko, Soviet pentathlete
- September 20
  - Rey Langit, Filipino journalist, radio host
  - George R. R. Martin, American speculative fiction author
- September 22
  - Denis Burke, Australian politician
  - Jim Byrnes, American voice actor, blues musician and actor
  - Mark Phillips, British army captain, equestrian and first husband of Anne, Princess Royal
- September 23 – José Lavat, Mexican voice actor (d. 2018)
- September 24 – Phil Hartman, Canadian actor, comedian (Saturday Night Live) (d. 1998)
- September 25
  - Cäcilia Rentmeister, German art historian, gender researcher
  - Vasile Șirli, Romanian musical composer and producer
  - Vladimir Yevtushenkov, Russian oligarch
- September 26
  - Maurizio Gucci, Italian businessman, murder victim (d. 1995)
  - Olivia Newton-John, English-born Australian singer, actress (d. 2022)
  - Vladimír Remek, Czech politician and cosmonaut
- September 27
  - Michele Dotrice, English actress
  - A Martinez, American actor, singer
- September 29
  - Mark Farner, American rock guitarist, singer (Grand Funk Railroad)
  - Bryant Gumbel, African-American television broadcaster (The Today Show)
  - Theo Jörgensmann, German jazz clarinetist (d. 2025)

=== October ===
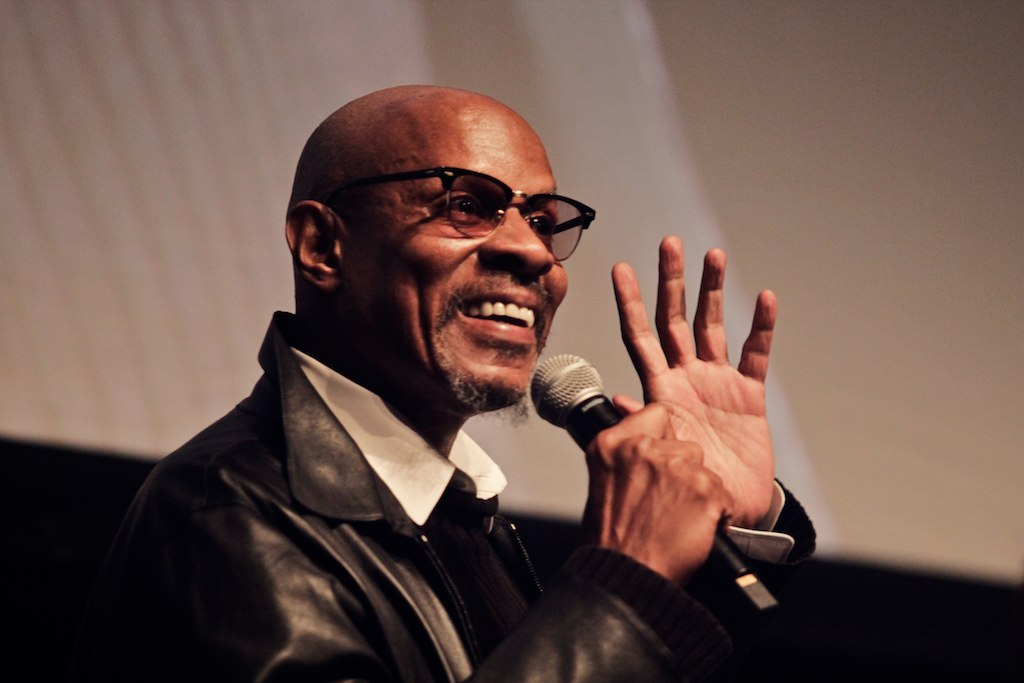
Avery Brooks

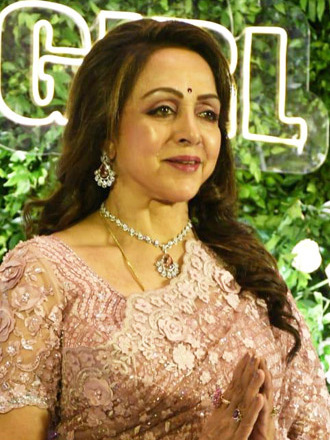
Hema Malini

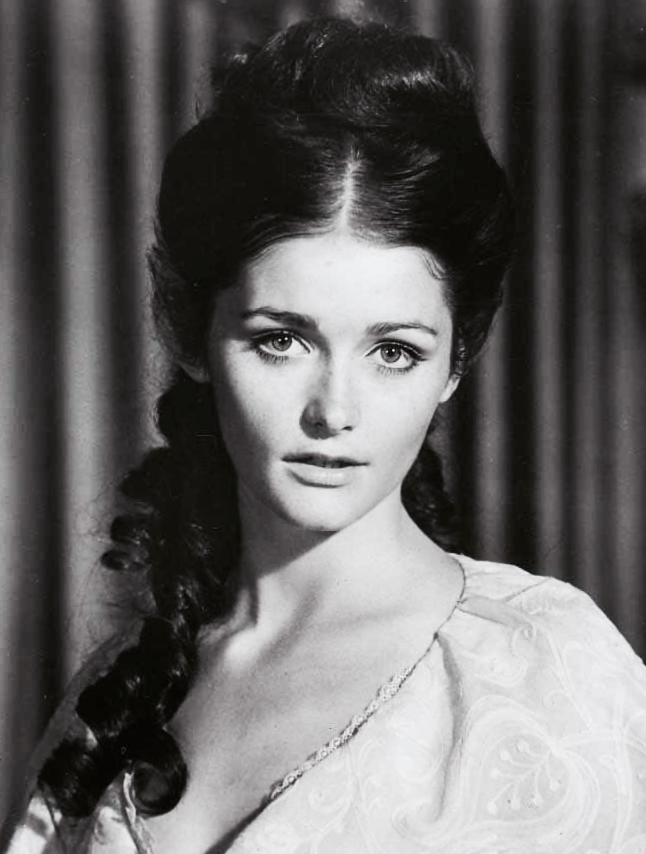
Margot Kidder

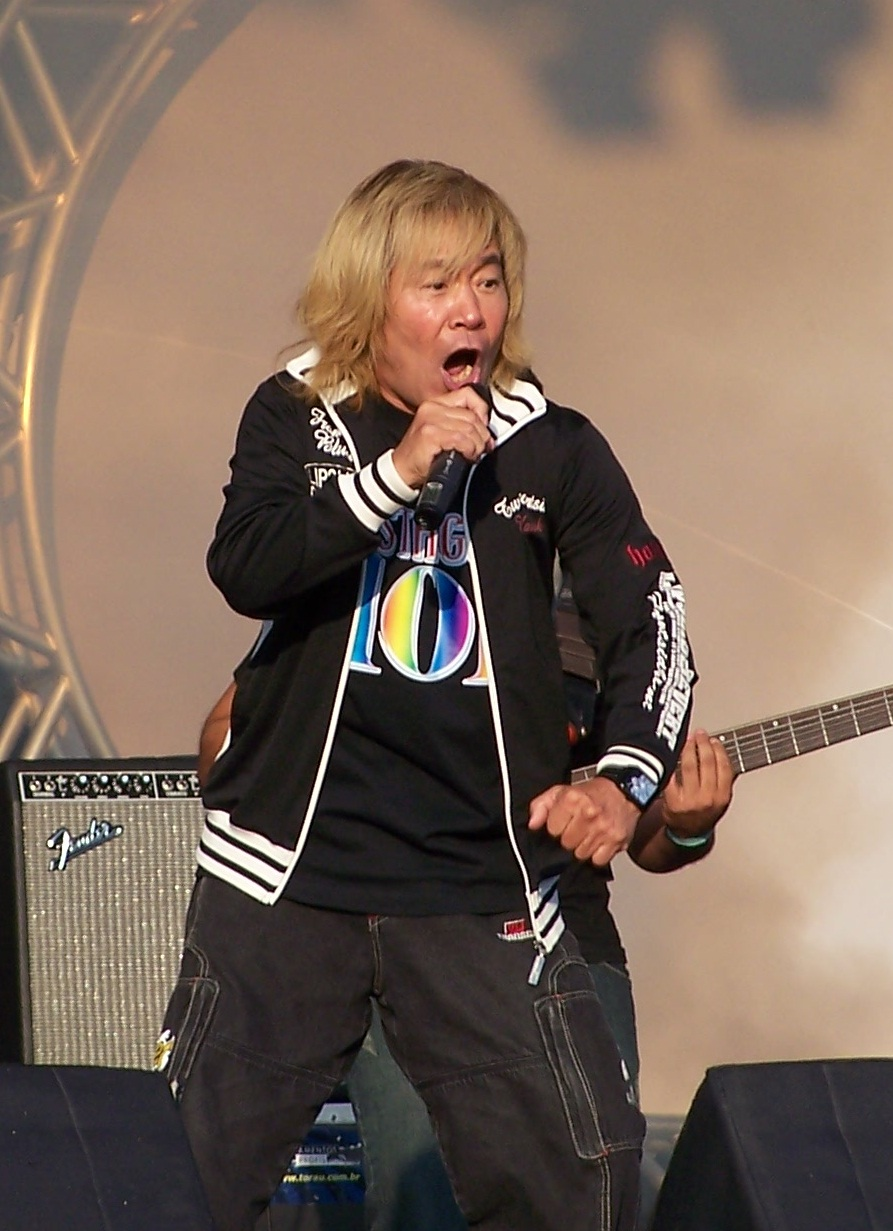
Akira Kushida

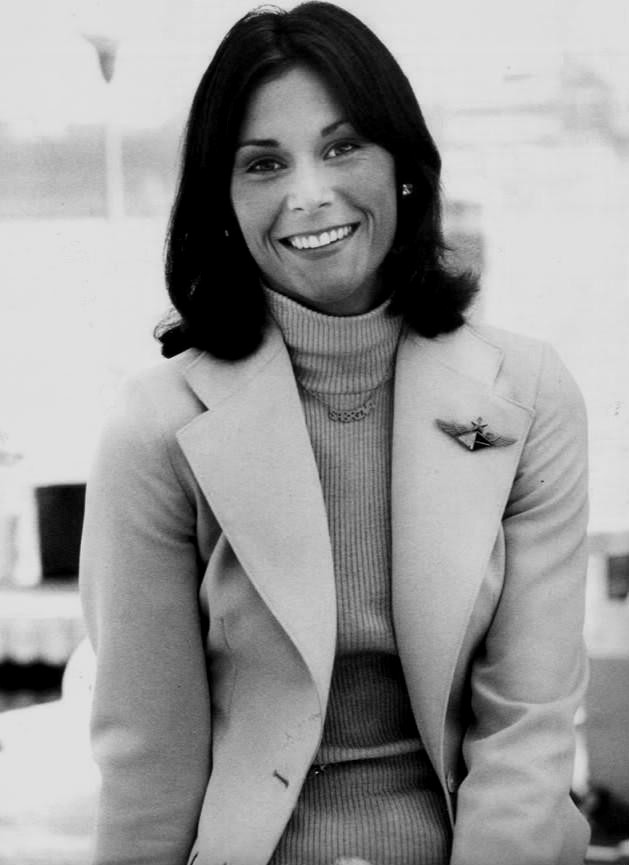
Kate Jackson

- October 1
  - Mark Landon, American actor (d. 2009)
  - Sir Peter Blake, New Zealand yachtsman (d. 2001)
- October 2
  - Avery Brooks, American actor, musician
  - Persis Khambatta, Indian actress, model (Star Trek: The Motion Picture) (d. 1998)
  - Chris LeDoux, American singer, rodeo star (d. 2005)
  - Donna Karan, American fashion designer
- October 4
  - Meg Bennett, American soap opera writer
  - Iain Hewitson, New Zealand-Australian chef, restaurateur, author and television personality
- October 5 – Russell Mael, American singer (Sparks)
- October 6
  - Wendell Ladner, American basketball player (d. 1975)
  - Gerry Adams, Northern Irish politician
- October 7 – Diane Ackerman, American poet, essayist
- October 8
  - Johnny Ramone, American guitarist (Ramones) (d. 2004)
  - Baldwin Spencer, 3rd Prime Minister of Antigua and Barbuda
- October 9
  - Jackson Browne, American rock musician ("Running on Empty")
  - Ciarán Carson, Northern Irish poet, novelist
  - Oliver Hart, English-born economist, Nobel Prize laureate
- October 11
  - Margie Alexander, American gospel, soul singer (d. 2013)
  - Cynthia Clawson, American gospel singer
- October 12
  - Rick Parfitt, English musician (Status Quo) (d. 2016)
  - Stephen Shepich, American politician and former member of the Michigan House of Representatives in 1993 and 1994 (d. 2013)
- October 13
  - John Ford Coley, American rock musician ("I'd Really Love to See You Tonight")
  - Nusrat Fateh Ali Khan, Pakistani musician (d. 1997)
- October 14
  - Engin Arık, Turkish nuclear physicist (d. 2007)
  - David Ruprecht, American actor, writer (Supermarket Sweep)
- October 15
  - Renato Corona, Filipino jurist, lawyer (d. 2016)
  - Chris de Burgh, born Christopher Davison, Argentine-born Anglo-Irish singer, songwriter
- October 16
  - Leo Mazzone, American baseball coach
  - Hema Malini, Indian actress, writer, director, producer, dancer and politician
- October 17
  - Robert Jordan, American novelist (d. 2007)
  - Margot Kidder, Canadian actress (Superman) (d. 2018)
  - Akira Kushida, Japanese singer
  - Ng Jui Ping, Singaporean entrepreneur, previously army general (d. 2020)
  - George Wendt, American actor (Cheers) (d. 2025)
- October 18
  - Hans Köchler, Austrian philosopher
  - Ntozake Shange, African-American playwright and poet (d. 2018)
- October 19 – Patrick Simmons, American musician (The Doobie Brothers)
- October 21
  - Tom Everett, American actor
  - Allen Vigneron, Roman Catholic Archbishop of Detroit
- October 22
  - Lynette Fromme, American attempted assassin of Gerald Ford
  - Debbie Macomber, American author
- October 23 – Sir Gerry Robinson, Irish-born British businessman (d. 2021)
- October 25
  - Dave Cowens, American basketball player, coach
  - Dan Gable, American wrestler, coach
  - Dan Issel, American basketball player and coach
- October 26 – Toby Harrah, American baseball player
- October 28 – Telma Hopkins, African-American actress, singer (Tony Orlando and Dawn)
- October 29
  - Giuseppe Chirichiello, Italian economist and university professor
  - Frans de Waal, Dutch primatologist. (d. 2024)
  - Kate Jackson, American actress (Charlie's Angels)
- October 30 – Garry McDonald, Australian actor, satirist and comedian

=== November ===
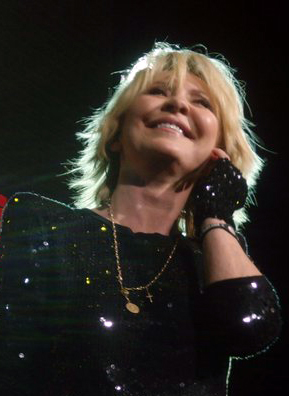
Lulu

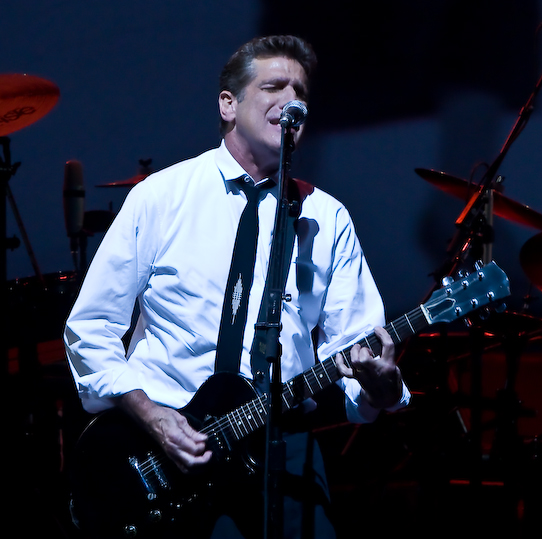
Glenn Frey

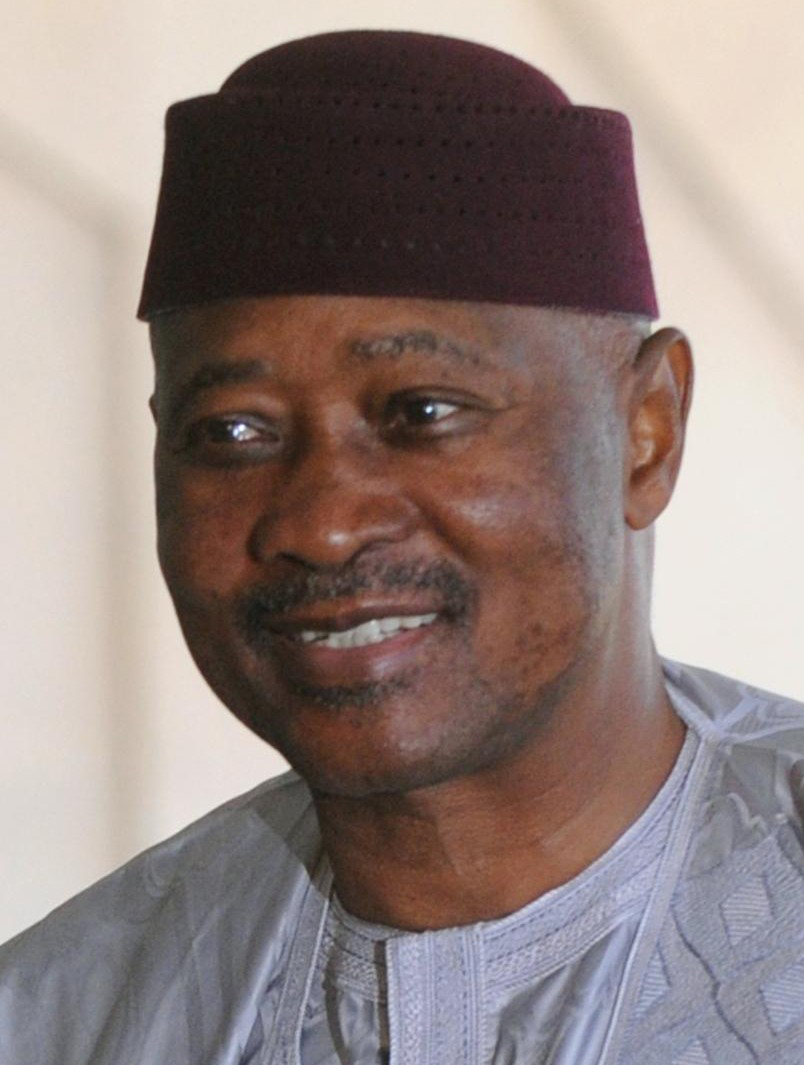
Amadou Toumani Touré

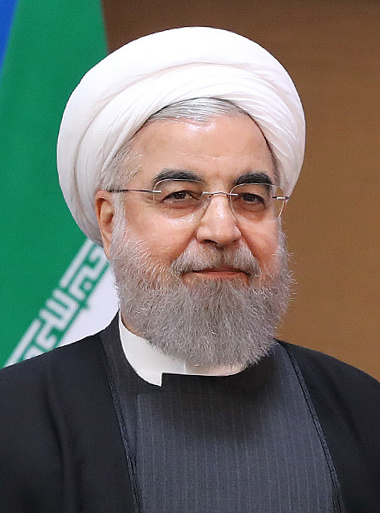
Hassan Rouhani

Charles III

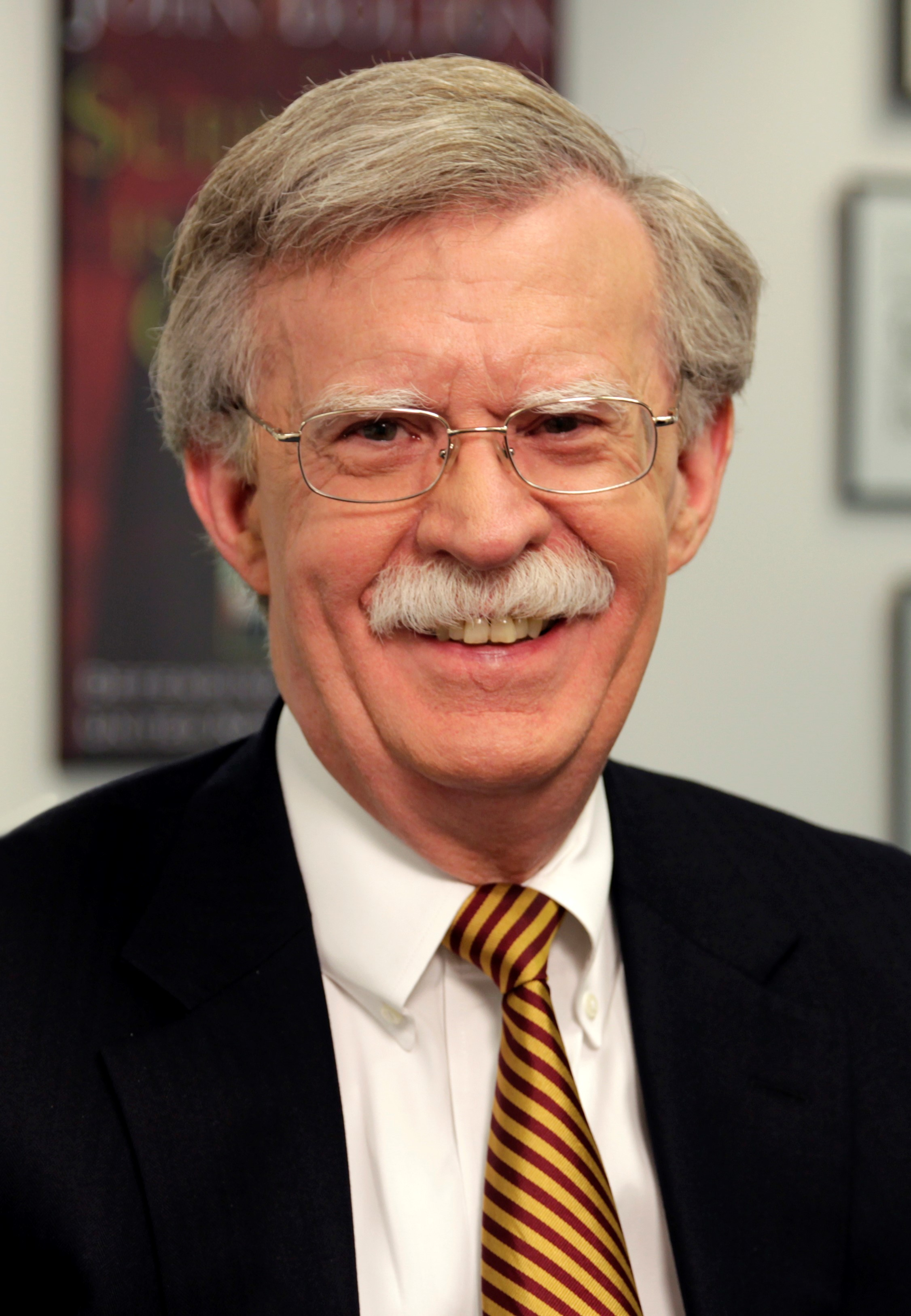
John Bolton

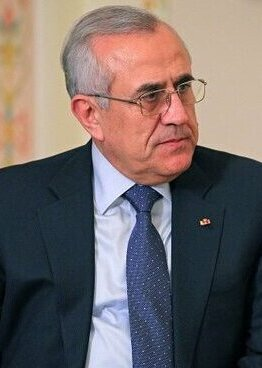
Michel Suleiman

- November 1 – Anna Stuart, American actress
- November 3 – Lulu (b. Marie McDonald McLaughlin Lawrie), Scottish singer, actress (To Sir, with Love)
- November 4
  - Delia Casanova, Mexican actress
  - Amadou Toumani Touré, 3rd President of Mali (d. 2020)
- November 5
  - Charles Bradley, African-American singer (d. 2017)
  - Bob Barr, American politician
  - Dallas Holm, American Christian musician
  - Zacharias Jimenez, Filipino Roman Catholic bishop (d. 2018)
  - Khalid Ibrahim Khan, Pakistani politician (d. 2018)
  - William Daniel Phillips, American physicist, Nobel Prize laureate
- November 6 – Glenn Frey, American guitarist, singer (Eagles) (d. 2016)
- November 7 – Jim Houghton, American actor and director (d. 2024)
- November 9
  - Viktor Matviyenko, Ukrainian footballer, coach (d. 2018)
  - Luiz Felipe Scolari, Brazilian football player, manager
  - Kelly Harmon, American actress and model
- November 10 – Mário Viegas, Portuguese actor and poetry reciter (d. 1996)
- November 11 – Vincent Schiavelli, American character actor and food writer (d. 2005)
- November 12
  - Skip Campbell, American politician (d. 2018)
  - Hassan Rouhani, 7th President of Iran
  - Richard Roberts, American evangelist, son of Oral Roberts
- November 13
  - Humayun Ahmed, Bengali-language writer
  - Lockwood Smith, New Zealand politician
- November 14
  - King Charles III of the United Kingdom
  - Robert Ginty, American actor, producer, screenwriter and director (d. 2009)
  - Dee Wallace, American actress
- November 15 – James Kemsley, Australian cartoonist, actor (d. 2007)
- November 16
  - Chi Coltrane, American musician (Thunder and Lightning)
  - Ken James, Australian actor
  - Mutt Lange, Rhodesian-born record producer
  - Mate Parlov, Yugoslav Olympic boxer (d. 2008)
- November 18 – Dom Irrera, American actor and stand-up comedian
- November 19 – Rance Allen, African-American gospel singer and preacher (d. 2020)
- November 20
  - Harlee McBride, American actress
  - John R. Bolton, U.S. Ambassador to the U.N., National Security Advisor
  - Barbara Hendricks, American singer
  - Richard Masur, American actor, director and president of the Screen Actors Guild
- November 21
  - Alphonse Mouzon, American jazz drummer (d. 2016)
  - Michel Suleiman, President of Lebanon
- November 22 – Saroj Khan, Indian dance choreographer (d. 2020)
- November 23
  - Dominique-France Picard (aka Princess Fadila of Egypt), wife of King Fuad II of Egypt and the Sudan
  - Ron Bouchard, American NASCAR driver (d. 2015)
  - Gabriele Seyfert, East German figure skater
  - Bonfoh Abass, Togolese politician and President of Togo (d. 2021)
- November 24 – Joe Howard, American actor
- November 25 – Antoine Sfeir, Franco-Lebanese journalist, professor (d. 2018)
- November 26
  - Elizabeth Blackburn, Australian-American biologist, winner of Nobel Prize in Physiology or Medicine
  - Gayle McCormick, American singer (Smith) (d. 2016)
  - Marianne Muellerleile, American actress
- November 28 – Agnieszka Holland, Polish film, television director and screenwriter

=== December ===
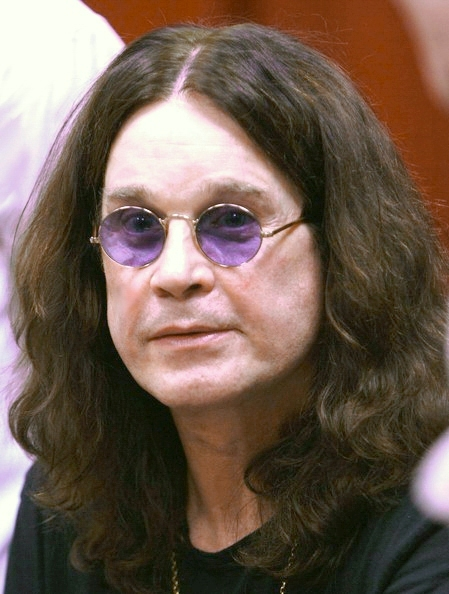
Ozzy Osbourne

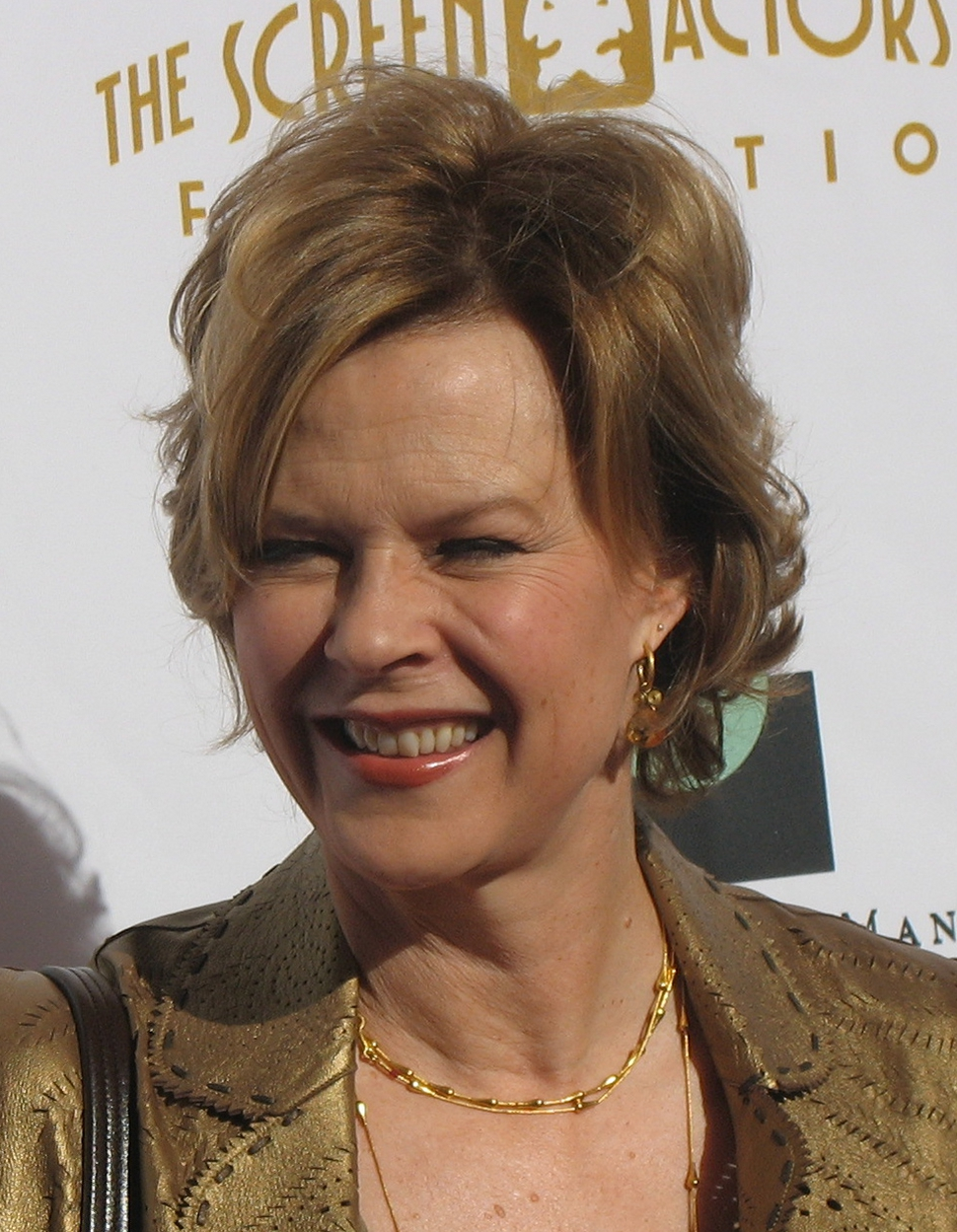
JoBeth Williams

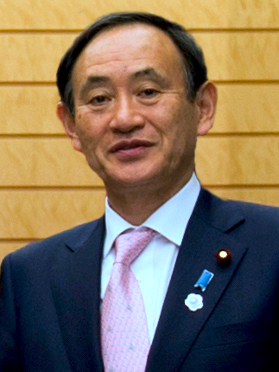
Yoshihide Suga

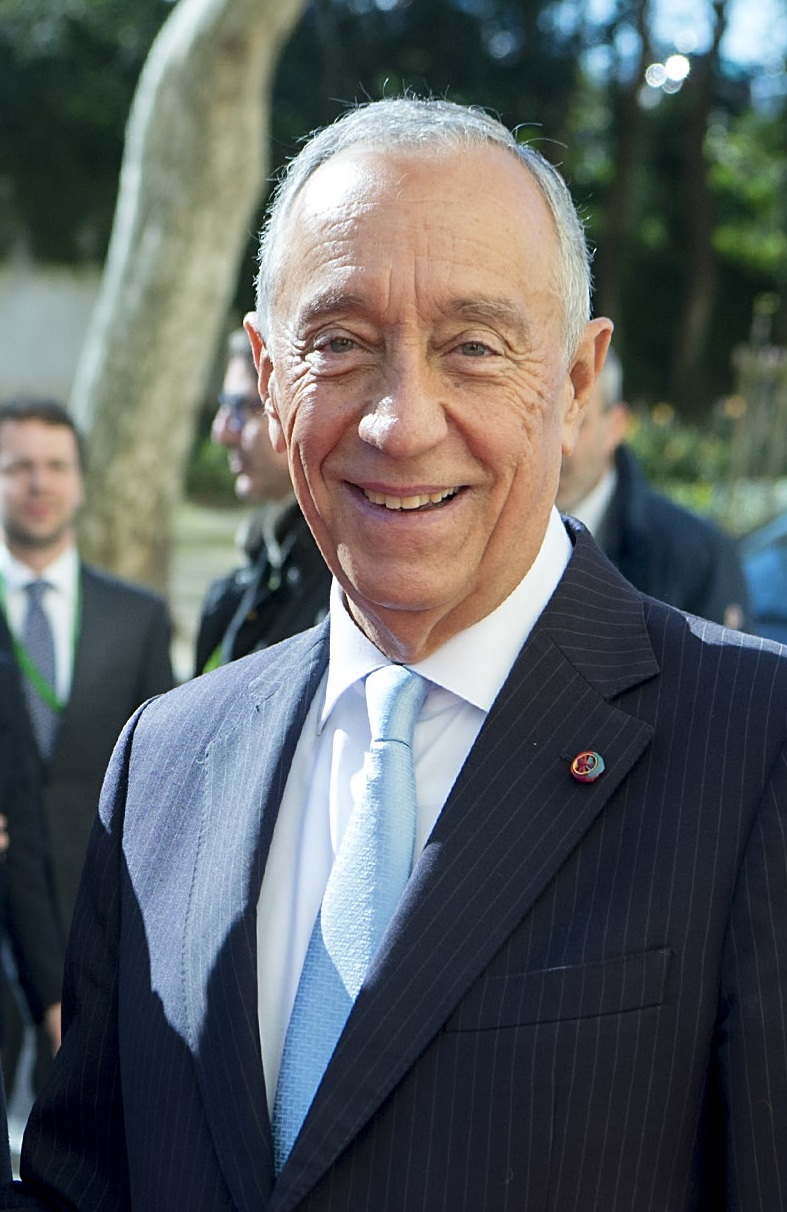
Marcelo Rebelo de Sousa

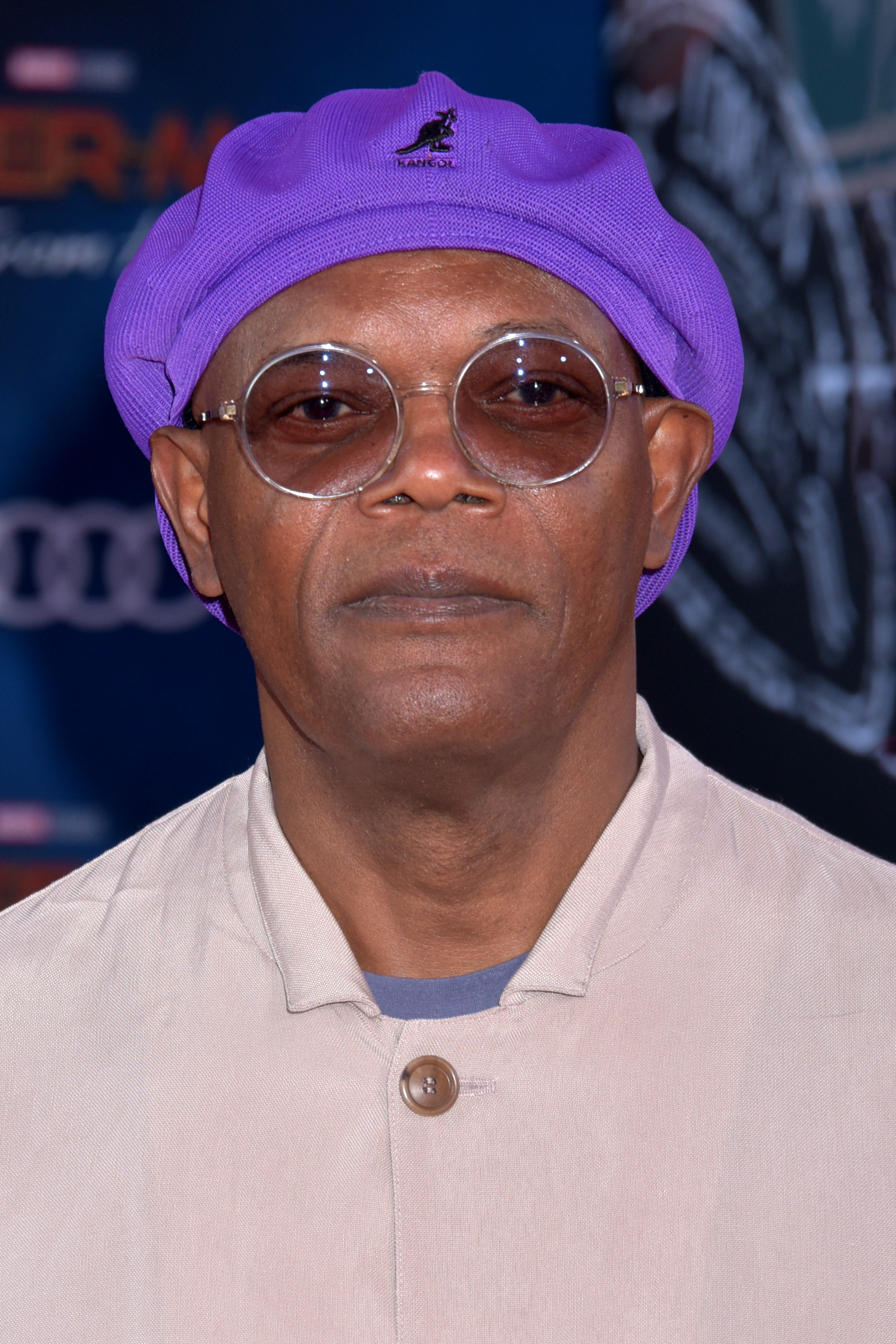
Samuel L. Jackson

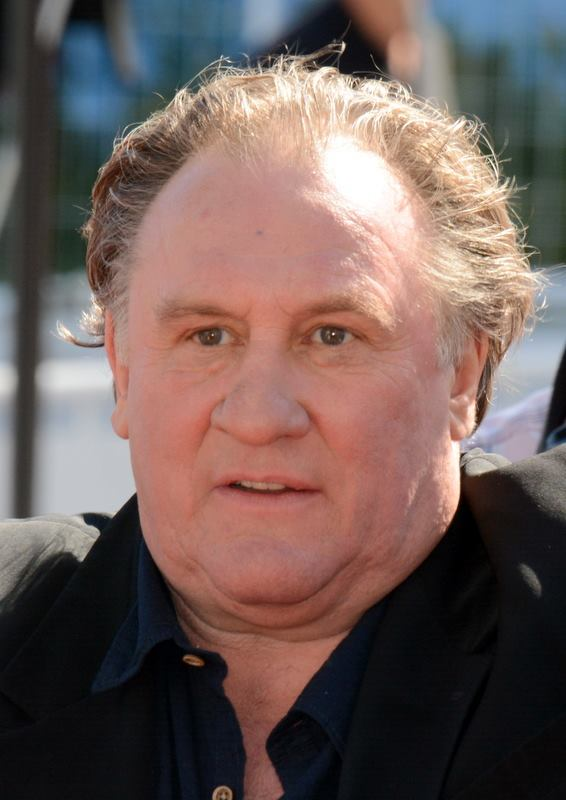
Gérard Depardieu

- December 1 – Geraint Davies, Welsh politician
- December 2
  - T. Coraghessan Boyle, American fiction writer
  - Rajat Gupta, Indian-American businessman
  - Patricia Hewitt, British Labour Party politician
  - Toninho Horta, Brazilian singer, musician
  - Christine Westermann, German television, radio host, journalist and author
- December 3
  - Rick Cua, American singer, evangelist
  - Ozzy Osbourne, British heavy metal singer (Black Sabbath) (d. 2025)
- December 5 – Saburō Shinoda, Japanese actor (Ultraman Taro)
- December 6
  - Keke Rosberg, Finnish Formula One champion
  - Marius Müller-Westernhagen, German actor, musician
  - JoBeth Williams, American actress, director
  - Yoshihide Suga, Prime Minister of Japan
- December 7
  - Gary Morris, American country singer, actor
  - Tony Thomas, American television and film producer
  - Mads Vinding, Danish bassist
- December 10 – Abu Abbas, Palestine Liberation Front founder (d. 2004)
- December 11
  - Shinji Tanimura, Japanese musician (d. 2023)
  - Chester Thompson, American rock drummer
- December 12 – Marcelo Rebelo de Sousa, 20th President of Portugal
- December 13
  - Lillian Board, South African-born English Olympic athlete (d. 1970)
  - Ted Nugent, American rock guitarist, singer, conservative political commentator (Cat Scratch Fever)
  - David O'List, English rock guitarist
- December 14
  - Lester Bangs, American music journalist (d. 1982)
  - Kim Beazley, Australian politician
  - Dee Wallace, American actress
- December 15
  - Melanie Chartoff, American actress and singer (Rugrats)
  - Charlie Scott, American basketball player
- December 18 – Edmund Kemper, American serial killer
- December 19 – Ken Brown, Canadian ice hockey player
- December 20
  - Orchidea De Santis, Italian actress
  - Abdulrazak Gurnah, Zanzibar-born novelist, Nobel Prize laureate
  - Alan Parsons, English songwriter, musician and record producer
- December 21
  - Samuel L. Jackson, American actor, film producer
  - Willi Resetarits, Austrian musician, cabaret artist
- December 22
  - Noel Edmonds, English TV presenter, DJ
  - Steve Garvey, American baseball player
  - Flip Mark, American child actor
  - Lynne Thigpen, American actress (Godspell) (d. 2003)
- December 23 – Jim Ferguson, American guitarist, composer, educator, author and music journalist
- December 24 – Antoni Pietkiewicz, Polish engineer, businessperson and politician
- December 25
  - Alia Al-Hussein, queen consort of Jordan (d. 1977)
  - Barbara Mandrell, American country singer, musician and actress
- December 27
  - Ronnie Caldwell, American soul music, rhythm and blues musician (d. 1967)
  - Gérard Depardieu, French actor
- December 28 – Mary Weiss, American pop singer (The Shangri-Las) (d. 2024)
- December 29 – Peter Robinson, Northern Ireland First Minister
- December 31
  - Stephen Cleobury, English choral conductor (d. 2019)
  - Joe Dallesandro, American model, actor
  - Sandy Jardine, Scottish professional footballer, playing for Rangers and Hearts and representing Scotland (d. 2014)
  - Donna Summer, African-American singer, actress (Love to Love You Baby) (d. 2012)

== Deaths ==
=== January ===
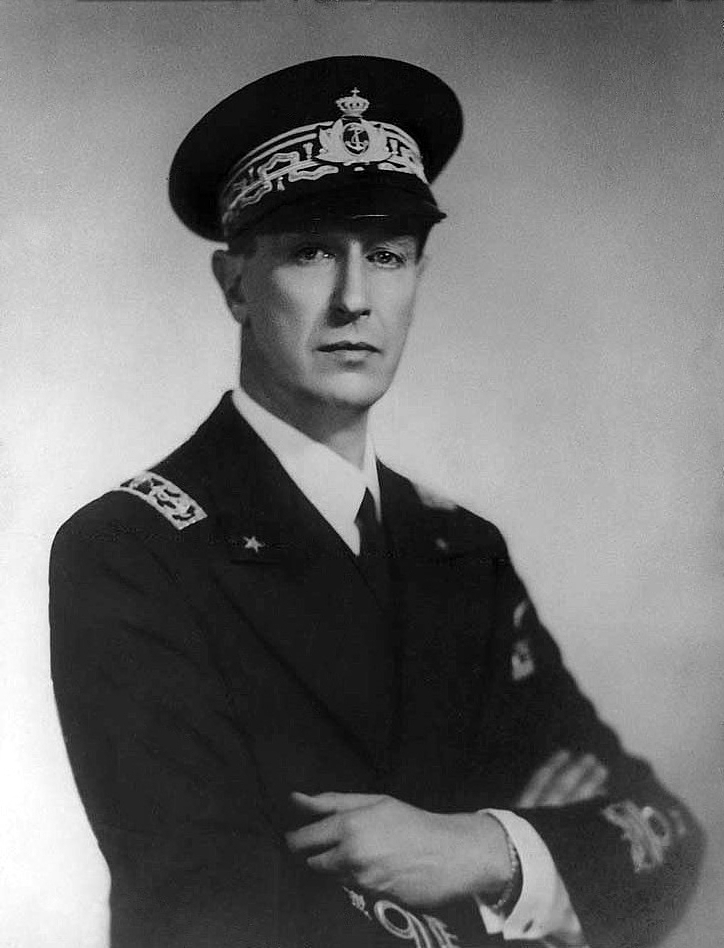
King Tomislav II of Croatia

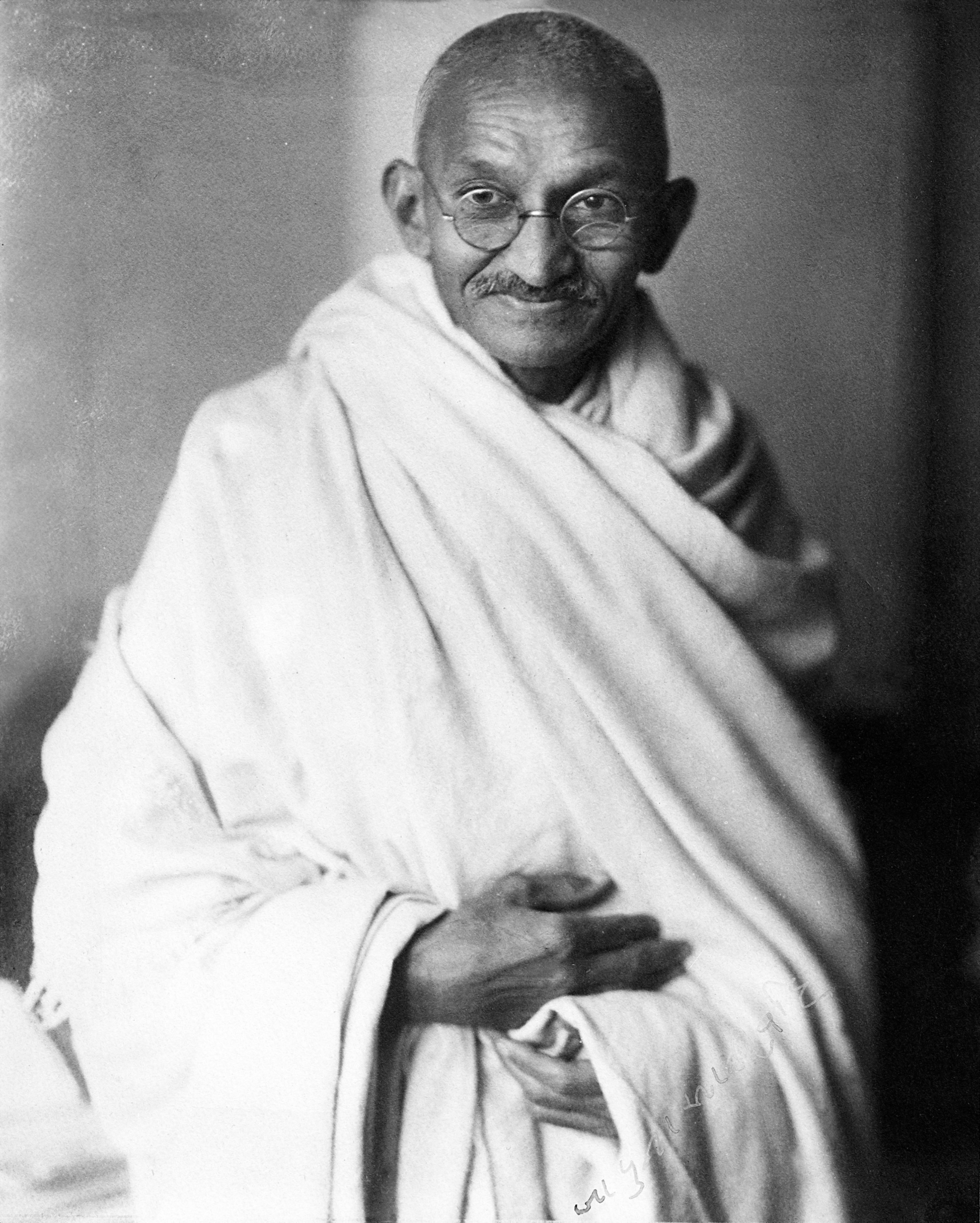
Mahatma Gandhi

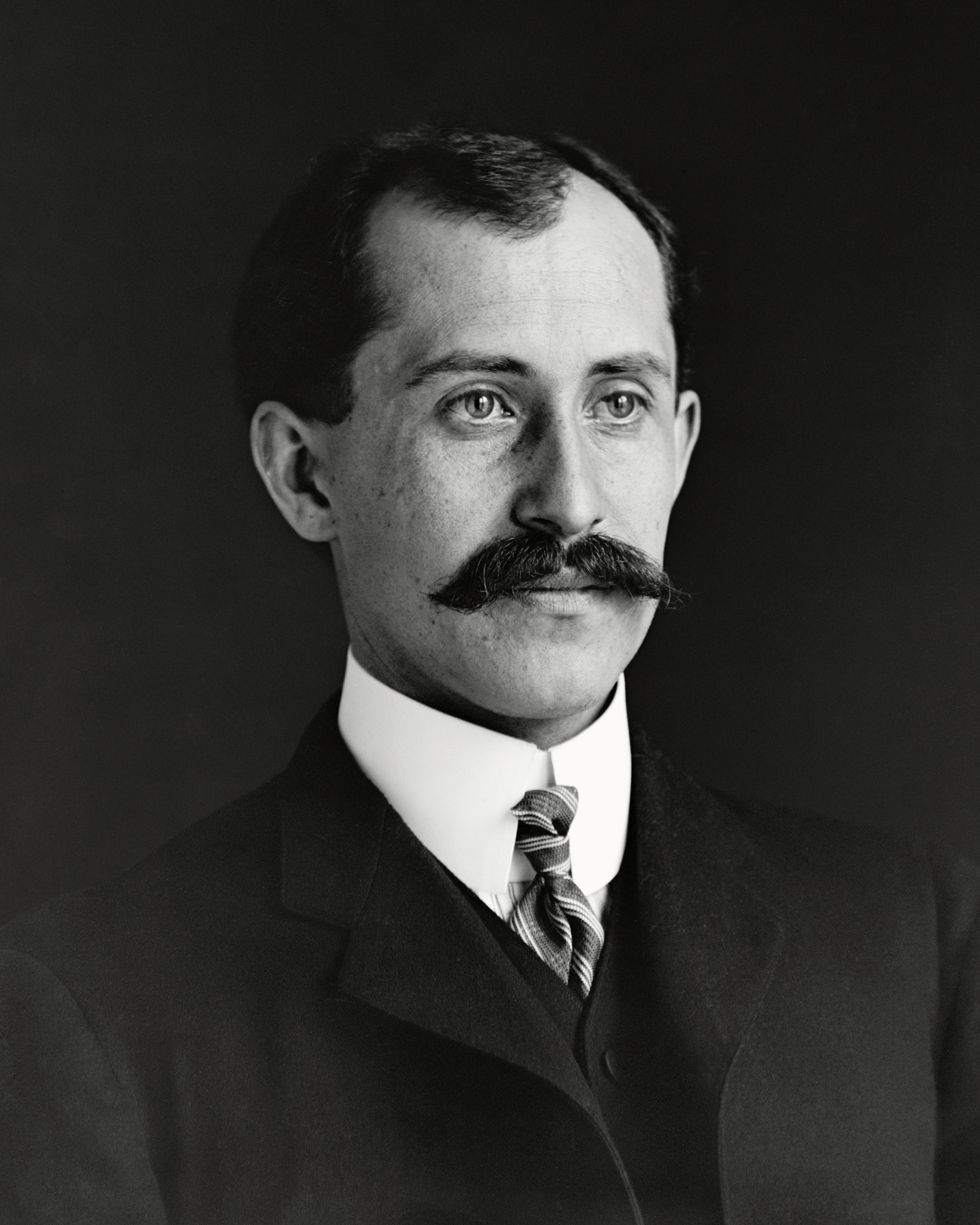
Orville Wright

- January 1 – Edna May, American actress (b. 1878)
- January 2 – Vicente Huidobro, Chilean poet (b. 1893)
- January 4
  - Anna Kallina, Austrian actress (b. 1874)
  - Norman Dawe, Canadian sports executive (b. 1898)
- January 5 – Mary Dimmick Harrison, wife of President Benjamin Harrison (b. 1858)
- January 7
  - Charles C. Wilson, American actor (b. 1894)
  - Maria de Maeztu Whitney, Spanish educator, feminist (b. 1882)
- January 8
  - Edward Stanley Kellogg, 16th Governor of American Samoa (b. 1870)
  - Charles Magnusson, Swedish producer, screenwriter (b. 1878)
  - Kurt Schwitters, German artist (b. 1887)
  - Richard Tauber, Austrian tenor (b. 1891)
- January 12 – Herbert Allen Farmer, American criminal (b. 1891)
- January 15 – Josephus Daniels, American diplomat and newspaper editor (b. 1862)
- January 19 – Tony Garnier, French architect (b. 1869)
- January 21
  - Eliza Moore, last person born into slavery in the United States (b. 1843)
  - Naomasa Sakonju, Japanese admiral and war criminal (executed) (b. 1890)
  - Ermanno Wolf-Ferrari, Italian composer (b. 1876)
- January 24
  - Bill Cody, American actor (b. 1891)
  - Maria Mandl, Austrian concentration camp guard and war criminal (executed) (b. 1912)
- January 26
  - Georg Bruchmüller, German artillery officer (b. 1863)
  - John Lomax, American musicologist and folklorist (b. 1867)
- January 28
  - Therese Brandl, German concentration camp guard and war criminal (executed) (b. 1902)
  - Anna Maria Gove, American physician (b. 1867)
- January 29 – King Tomislav II of Croatia (b. 1900)
- January 30
  - Sir Arthur Coningham, British air force air marshal (disappeared) (b. 1895)
  - Mahatma Gandhi, Leader of Indian independence movement, (assassinated) (b. 1869)
  - Orville Wright, American co-inventor of the airplane (b. 1871)

=== February ===
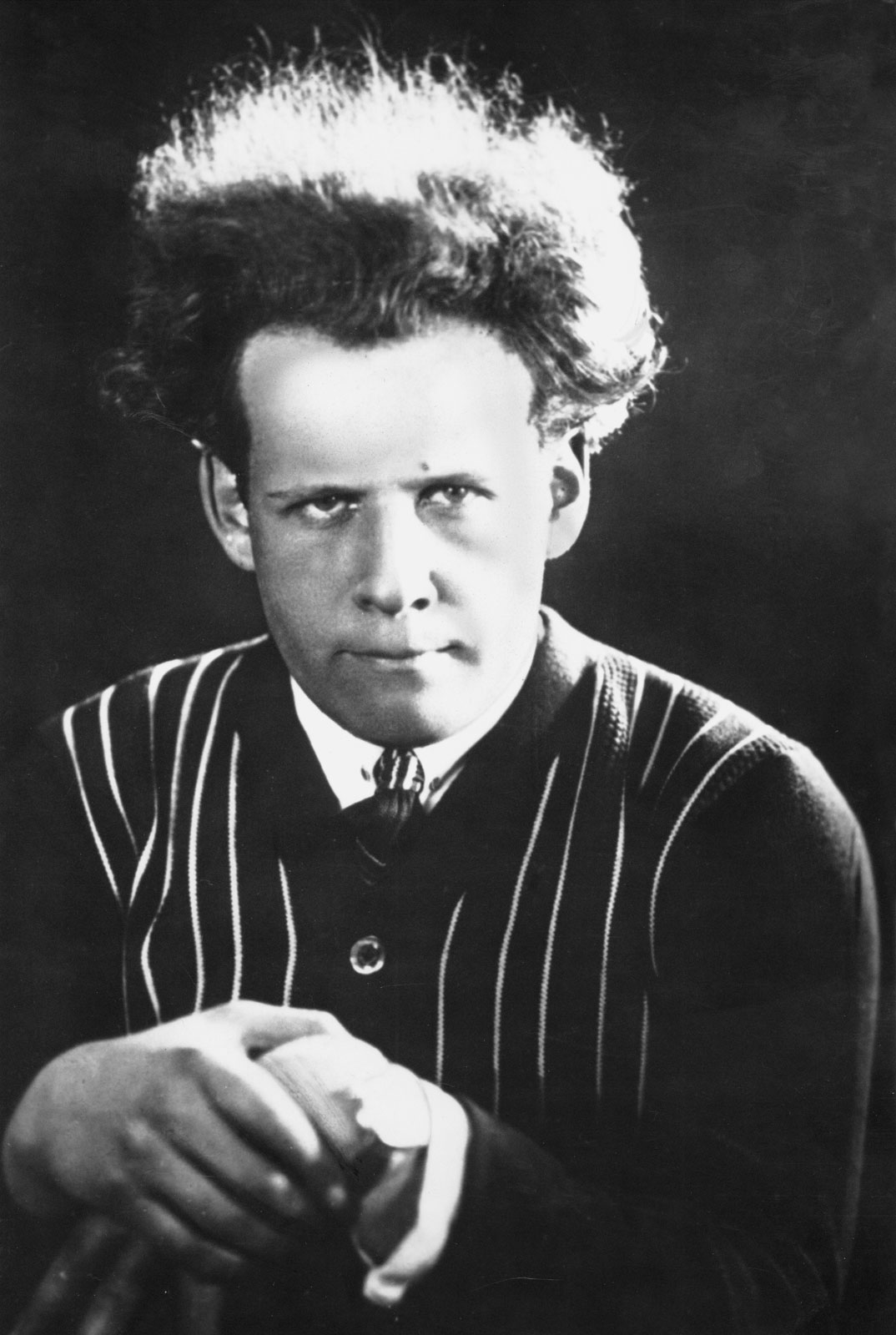
Sergei Eisenstein

- February 2
  - Thomas W. Lamont, American banker (b. 1870)
  - Bevil Rudd, South African athlete (b. 1894)
- February 4
  - Otto Praeger, American postal official, implemented U.S. Airmail (b. 1871)
  - Edward Stanley, British politician (b. 1865)
- February 5 – Johannes Blaskowitz, German general (b. 1883)
- February 8 – Samuel P. Bush, American businessman, industrialist (b. 1863)
- February 9 – Karl Valentin, German actor (b. 1882)
- February 11
  - Sergei Eisenstein, Soviet film director (b. 1898)
  - Sir Isaac Isaacs, 9th Governor-General of Australia (b. 1855)
- February 13 – Pietro d'Acquarone, Italian soldier, entrepreneur and politician (b. 1890)
- February 15 – Subhadra Kumari Chauhan, Indian poet (b. 1904)
- February 23 – John Robert Gregg, Irish-born inventor of shorthand (b. 1867)
- February 25
  - Alfredo Baldomir, Uruguayan politician, soldier, architect, 27th President of Uruguay and World War II leader (b. 1884)
  - Alexander du Toit, South African geologist (b. 1878)
  - Juan Esteban Montero, Chilean political figure, 20th President of Chile (b. 1879)
- February 26 – John B. Creeden, American Catholic priest and Jesuit (b. 1871)
- February 27 – Patriarch Nicodim of Romania (b. 1864).

=== March ===
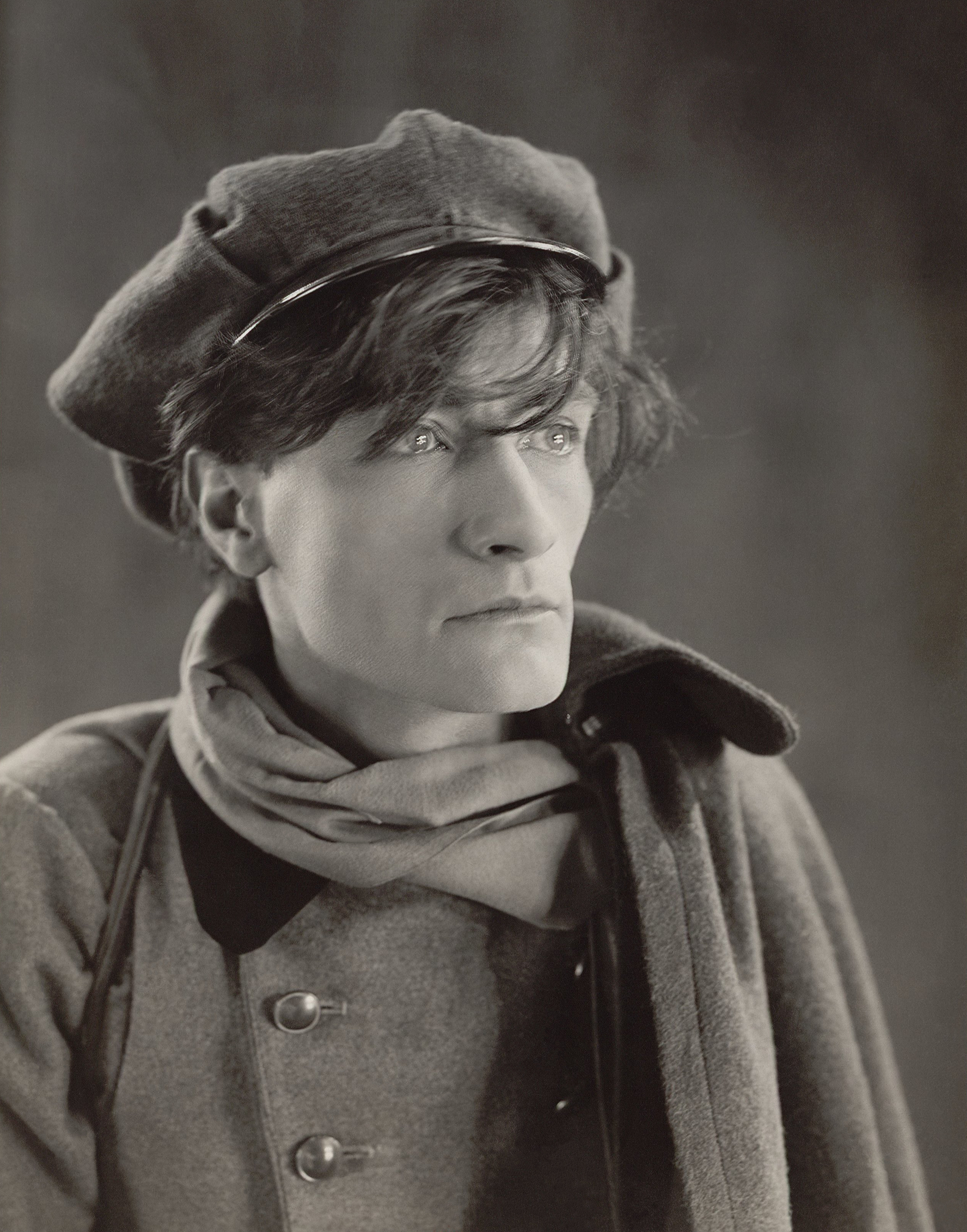
Antonin Artaud

- March 4
  - Antonin Artaud, French playwright, actor and director (b. 1896)
  - Elsa Brändström, Swedish nurse (b. 1888)
- March 9 – Edgar de Wahl, Estonian educator and inventor of Interlingue (b. 1867)
- March 10
  - Zelda Fitzgerald, American wife of F. Scott Fitzgerald (b. 1900)
  - Jan Masaryk, Czechoslovak Foreign Minister (b. 1886)
- March 16 – León S. Morra, Argentine physician and university professor (b. 1882)
- March 23
  - George Milne, 1st Baron Milne, British field marshal (b. 1866)
  - Eddy Chandler, American actor (b. 1894)
- March 24
  - Nikolai Berdyaev, Soviet religious leader, political philosopher (b. 1874)
  - Paolo Thaon di Revel, Italian admiral (b. 1859)
- March 25 – Joseph M. Reeves, American admiral (b. 1872)
- March 29 – Harry Price, English psychic researcher (b. 1881)
- March 31 – Egon Erwin Kisch, Austrian journalist, author (b. 1885)

=== April ===
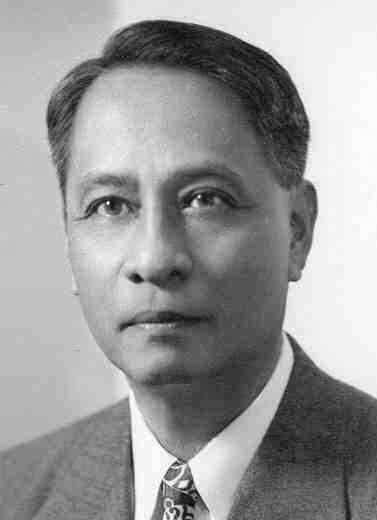
Manuel Roxas

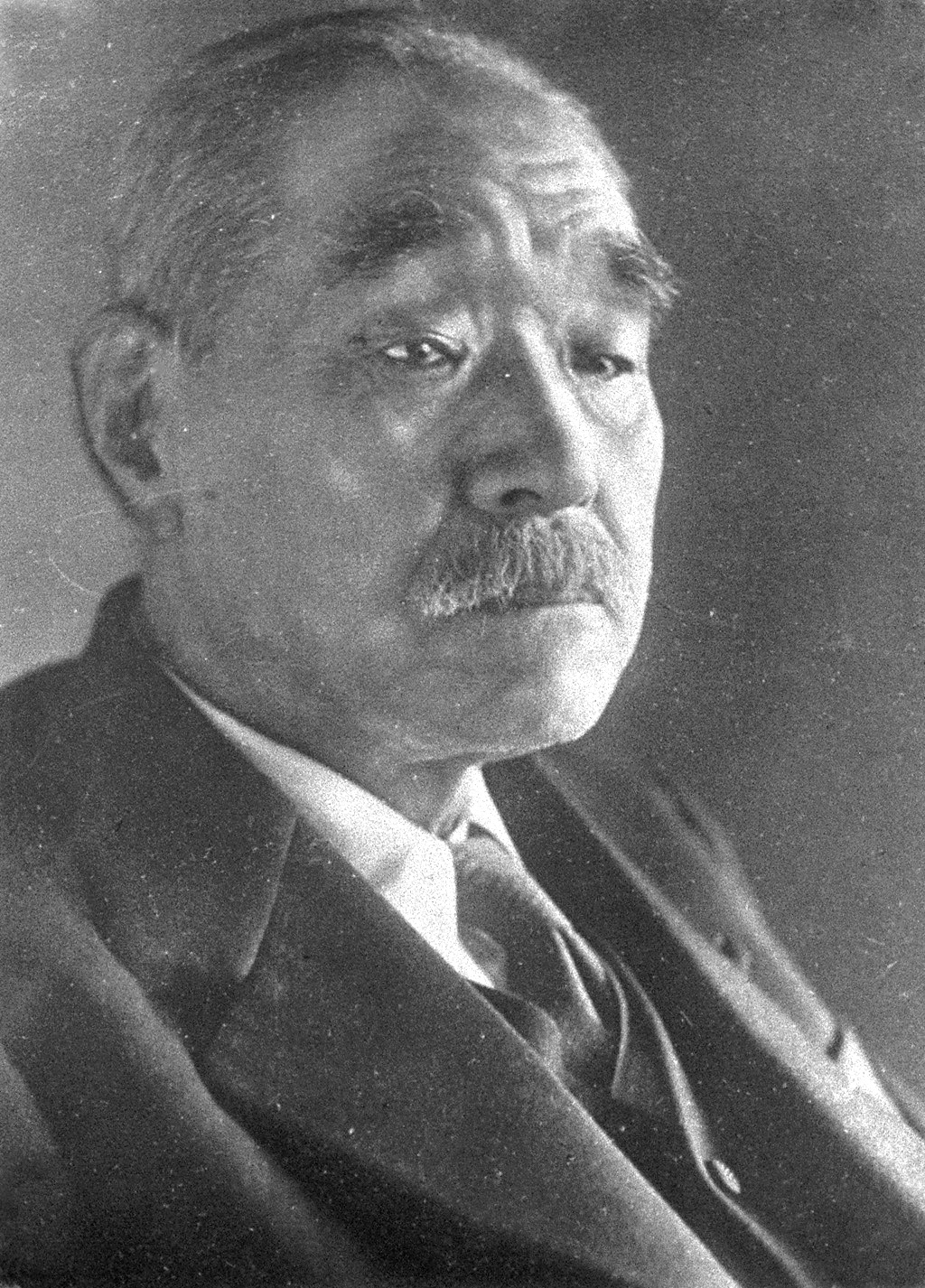
Kantarō Suzuki

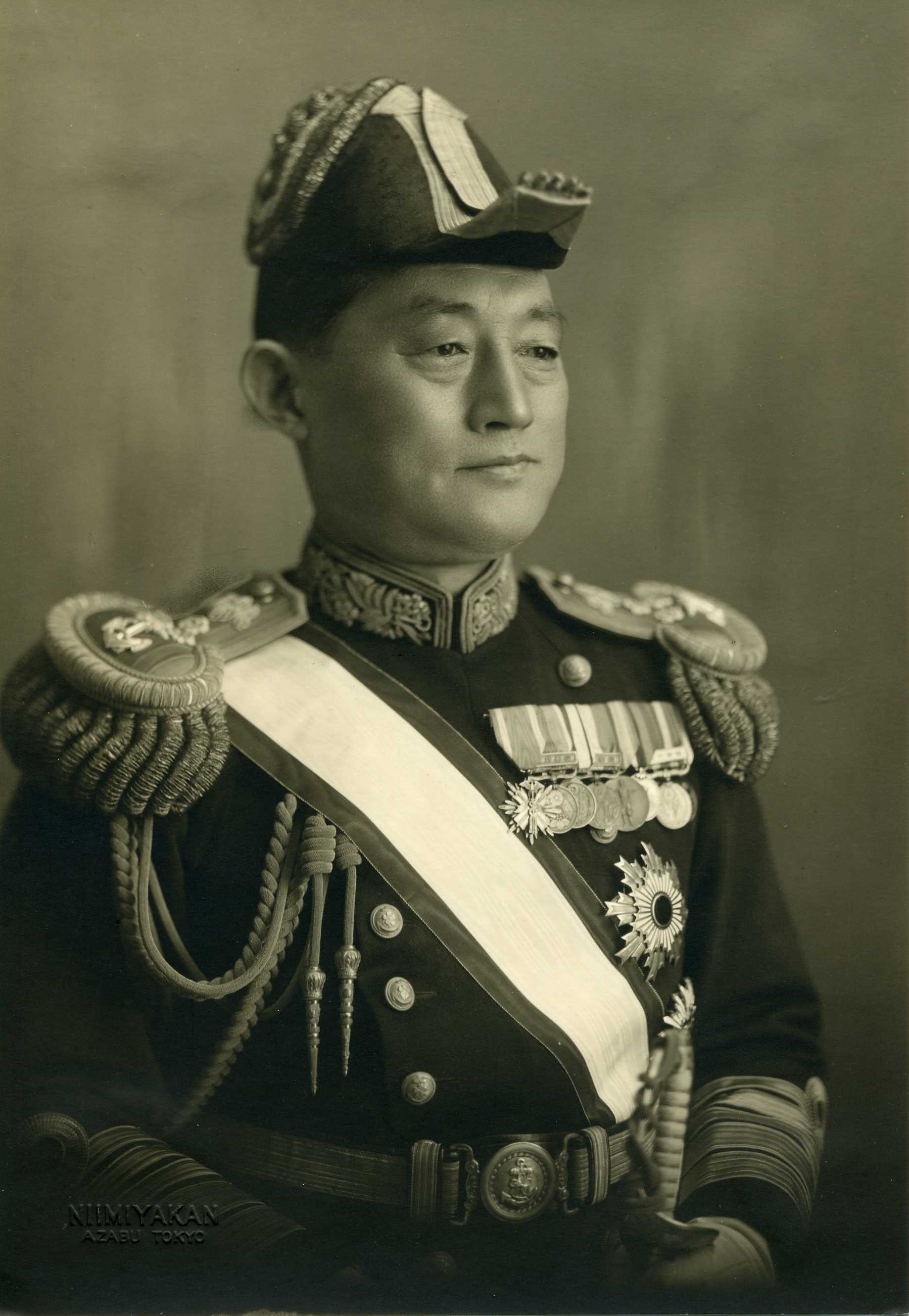
Mitsumasa Yonai

- April 2
  - Biagio Biagetti, Italian painter (b. 1877)
  - Sawan Singh, Indian saint known as "The Great Master" (b. 1858)
- April 5
  - Angelo Joseph Rossi, American political figure, Mayor of San Francisco (b. 1878)
  - Abby Aldrich Rockefeller, American socialite and philanthropist (b. 1874)
- April 7 – Isabel Andreu de Aguilar, Puerto Rican writer, educator, philanthropist and activist (b. 1887)
- April 8 – Abd al-Qadir al-Husayni, Palestinian Arab nationalist (b. 1907)
- April 9 – Jorge Eliécer Gaitán, Colombian politician (assassinated) (b. 1903)
- April 14 – W. H. Ellis, American attorney and politician (b. 1867)
- April 15
  - Radola Gajda, Czech military commander and politician (b. 1892)
  - Manuel Roxas, Filipino statesman, 5th President of the Philippines (b. 1892)
- April 17 – Kantarō Suzuki, Japanese admiral, 42nd Prime Minister of Japan (b. 1868)
- April 19 – Mikhail Rostovtsev, Soviet actor (b. 1872)
- April 20 – Mitsumasa Yonai, Japanese admiral and politician, 37th Prime Minister of Japan (b. 1880)
- April 21
  - Carlos López Buchardo, Argentine composer (b. 1881)
  - Aldo Leopold, American conservationist (b. 1887)
- April 22 – Prosper Montagné, French chef and author (b. 1865)
- April 24 – Manuel Ponce, Mexican composer (b. 1882)
- April 25 – Gerardo Matos Rodriguez, Uruguayan composer, journalist and pianist (b. 1897)
- April 30 – Alfredo Miguel Aguayo Sánchez, Puerto Rican educator, writer (b. 1866)

=== May ===
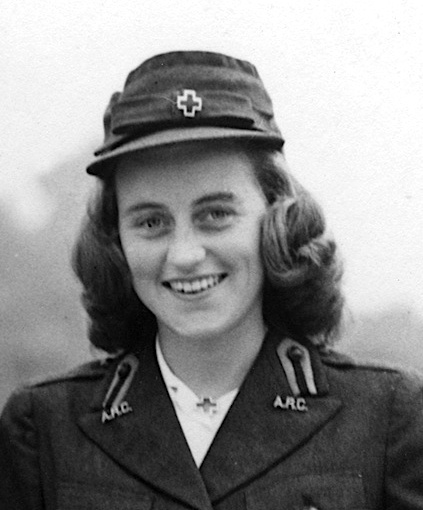
Kathleen Cavendish

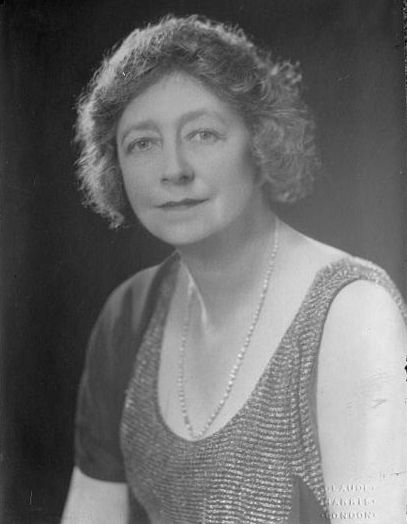
Dame May Whitty

- May 9 – Viola Allen, American actress (b. 1867)
- May 11 – Ed Ricketts, American marine biologist (b. 1897)
- May 13
  - Milan Begović, Yugoslavian writer (b. 1876)
  - Kathleen Cavendish, Marchioness of Hartington (b. 1920)
- May 15
  - André Dauchez, French painter (b. 1870)
  - Father Edward J. Flanagan, Irish-born American Roman Catholic priest, founder of Boys Town and monsignor (b. 1886)
  - Toyoaki Horiuchi, Japanese general, Class B war criminal suspect (executed) (b. 1900)
- May 16 – Muhammad Habibullah, Indian politician (b. 1869)
- May 18
  - Francisco Alonso, Spanish composer (b. 1887)
  - Mary Hayes Davis, American writer and newspaper publisher (b. c.1884)
- May 19 – Maximilian Lenz, Austrian painter and sculptor (b. 1860)
- May 20 – George Beurling, Canadian fighter pilot and flying ace (b. 1921)
- May 21 – Jacques Feyder, French filmmaker (b. 1885)
- May 22 – Claude McKay, Jamaican-born American writer and poet (b. 1889)
- May 25 – Witold Pilecki, Polish resistance leader (executed) (b. 1901)
- May 26 – Émile Gaston Chassinat, French egyptologist (b. 1868)
- May 28 – Unity Mitford, British socialite; friend of Adolf Hitler (b. 1914)
- May 29 – Dame May Whitty, British actress (b. 1865)
- May 30 – József Klekl, Slovene politician in Hungary (b. 1874)

=== June ===
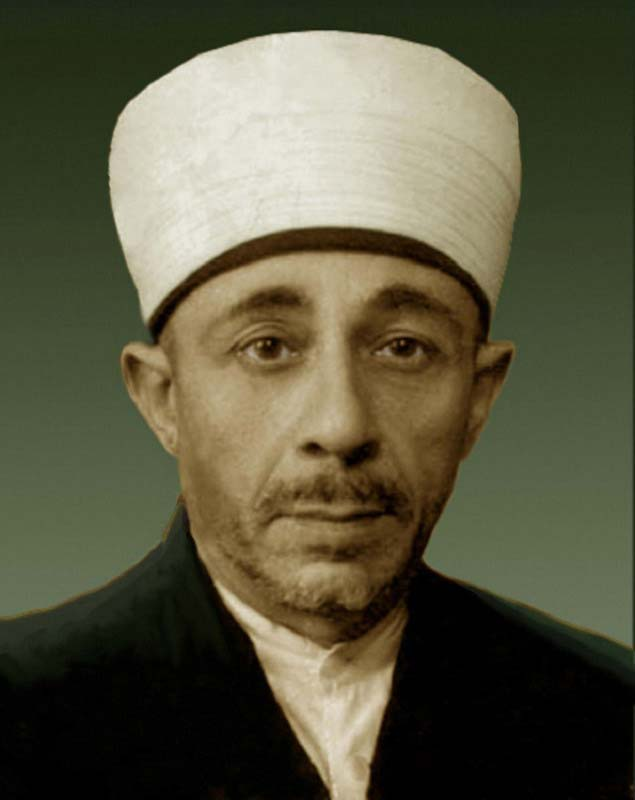
Nasib al-Bitar

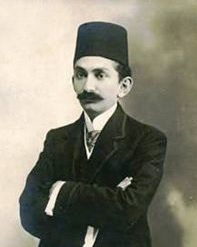
Prince Sabahaddin

- June 1 – José Vianna da Motta, Portuguese pianist, teacher and composer (b. 1868)
- June 2
  - Viktor Brack, German doctor (executed) (b. 1904)
  - Karl Brandt, German S.S. officer (executed) (b. 1904)
  - Rudolf Brandt, German S.S. officer (executed) (b. 1909)
  - Karl Gebhardt, German S.S. officer (executed) (b. 1897)
  - Waldemar Hoven, German S.S. officer (executed) (b. 1903)
  - Joachim Mrugowsky, German S.S. officer (executed) (b. 1905)
  - Wolfram Sievers, German S.S. officer (executed) (b. 1905)
- June 6 – Louis Lumière, French film pioneer (b. 1864)
- June 8 – Giacomo Albanese, Italian mathematician (b. 1890)
- June 13
  - Osamu Dazai, Japanese writer (b. 1909)
  - Jim McCairns, English pilot with the Royal Air Force (b. 1919)
- June 14 – Gertrude Atherton, American author (b. 1857)
- June 16 – Eugênia Álvaro Moreyra, Brazilian journalist, actress and director (b. 1898)
- June 19 – Adolphus Andrews, American Navy admiral (b. 1879)
- June 25 – Bento de Jesus Caraça, Portuguese mathematician, economist and statistician (b. 1901)
- June 26
  - Nasib al-Bitar, Palestine jurist (b. 1890)
  - Lilian Velez, Filipino actress (murdered) (b. 1924)
- June 30 – Prince Sabahaddin (b. 1879)

=== July ===
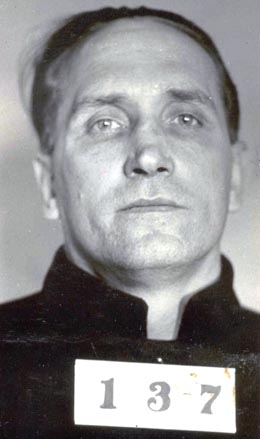
Albert Bates

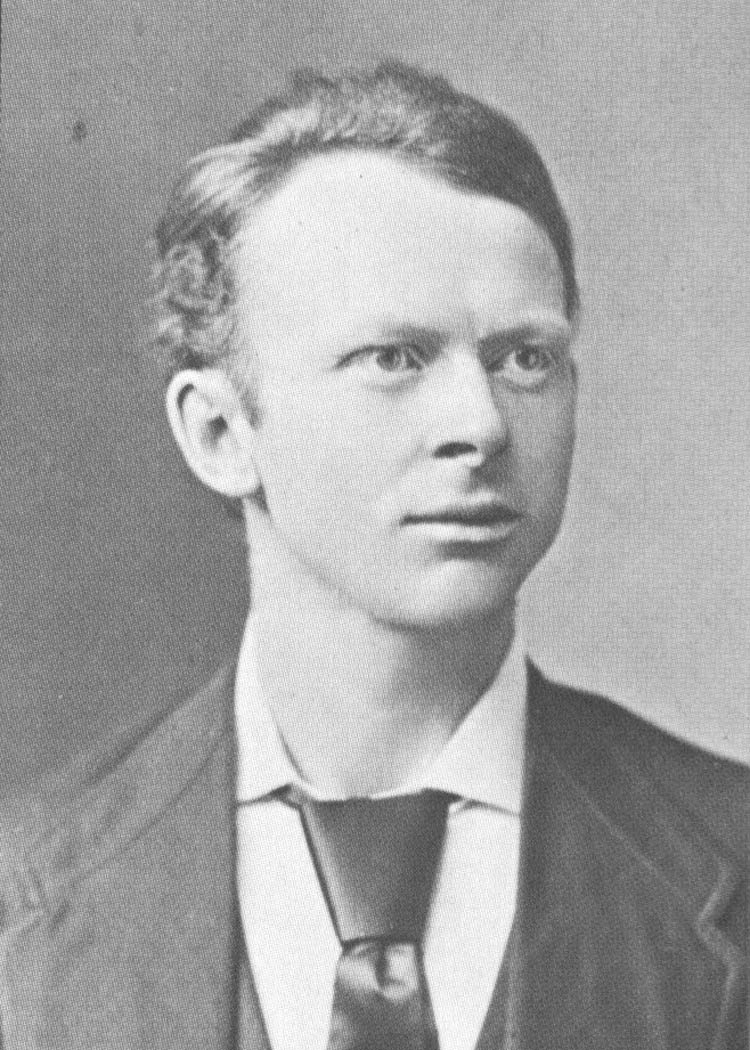
Charles Fillmore

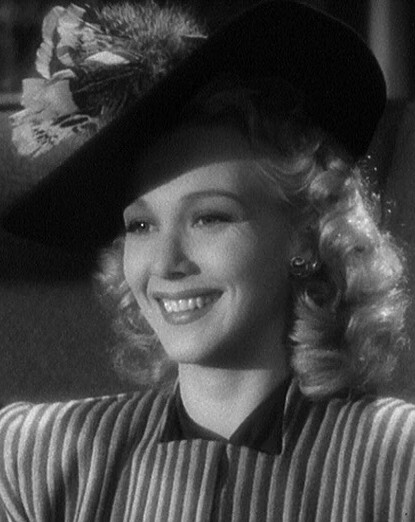
Carole Landis

- July 1 – Assunta Marchetti, Italian Roman Catholic religious professed and blessed
- July 4
  - Albert Bates, American criminal (b. 1893)
  - Monteiro Lobato, Brazilian writer (b. 1882)
- July 5
  - Georges Bernanos, French writer (b. 1888)
  - Charles Fillmore, American Protestant mystic (b. 1854)
  - Carole Landis, American actress (b. 1919)
  - María de la Ossa de Amador, First Lady of Panama (b.1855)
- July 9 – Alcibiades Diamandi, Greek political figure (b. 1893)
- July 11
  - King Baggot, American actor (b. 1879)
  - Franz Weidenreich, German anatomist, physical anthropologist (b. 1873)
- July 14
  - Harry Brearley, British inventor of stainless steel (b. 1871)
  - Marguerite Moreno, French actress (b. 1871)
- July 15 – John J. Pershing, American general (b. 1860)
- July 17 – Ildebrando Zacchini, Maltese painter, inventor and traveller (b. 1868)
- July 18 – Baldassarre Negroni, Italian director, screenwriter (b. 1877)
- July 21 – Arshile Gorky, Soviet-born American painter (b. 1904)
- July 22 – Sud Mennucci, Brazilian journalist, educator (b. 1882)
- July 23 – D. W. Griffith, American film director (The Birth of a Nation) (b. 1875)
- July 24 – Pencho Zlatev, Bulgarian general, 25th Prime Minister of Bulgaria (b. 1881)
- July 26 – Antonin Sertillanges, French Catholic philosopher, spiritual writer (b. 1863)
- July 27 – Joe Tinker, American baseball player, MLB Hall of Fame member (b. 1880)
- July 28 – Susan Glaspell, American playwright (b. 1876)
- July 30 – Sophonisba Breckinridge, American lawyer, reformer, social scientist and activist (b. 1866)
- July 31 – Lucy Mercer Rutherfurd, mistress of President Franklin Delano Roosevelt (b. 1891)

=== August ===
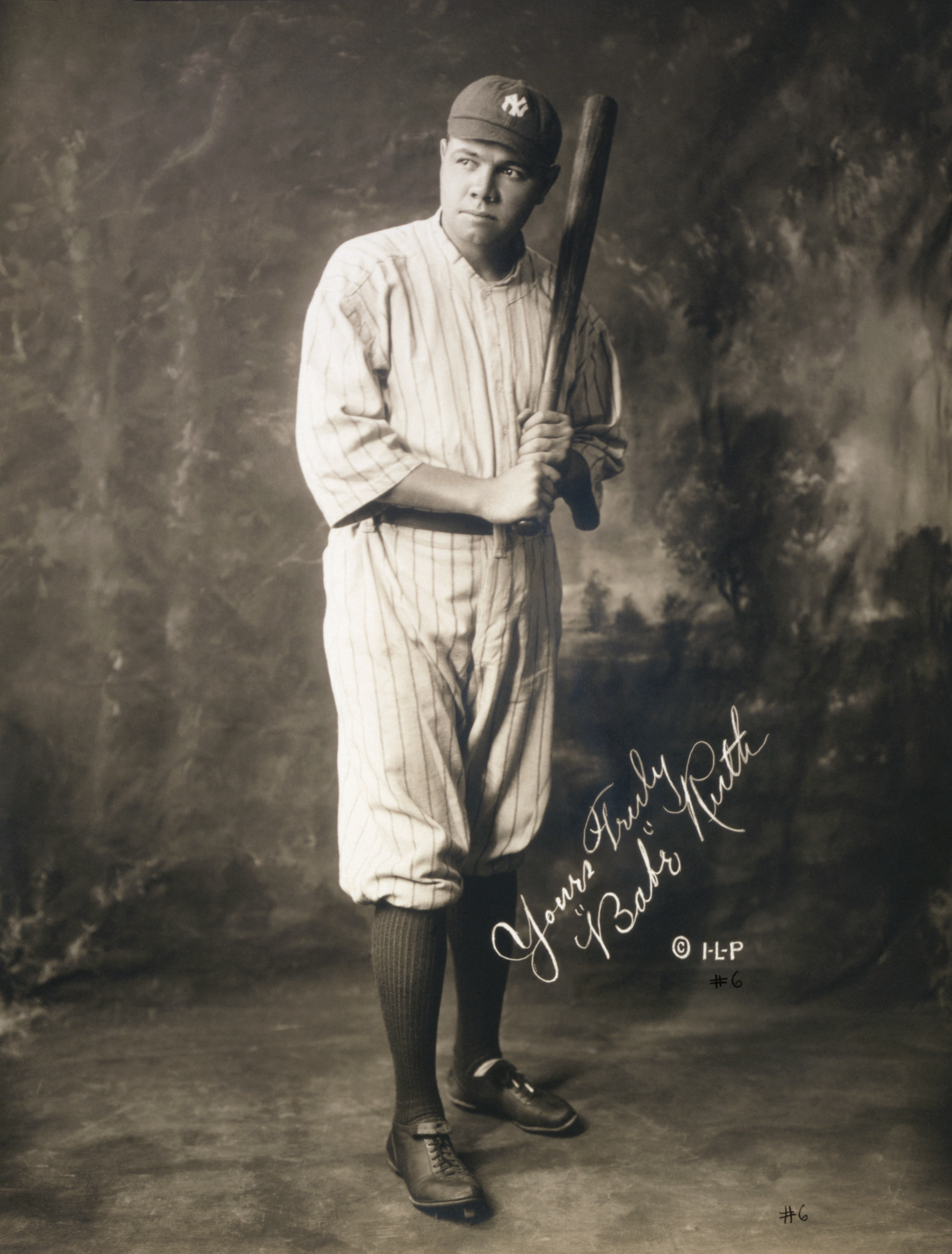
Babe Ruth

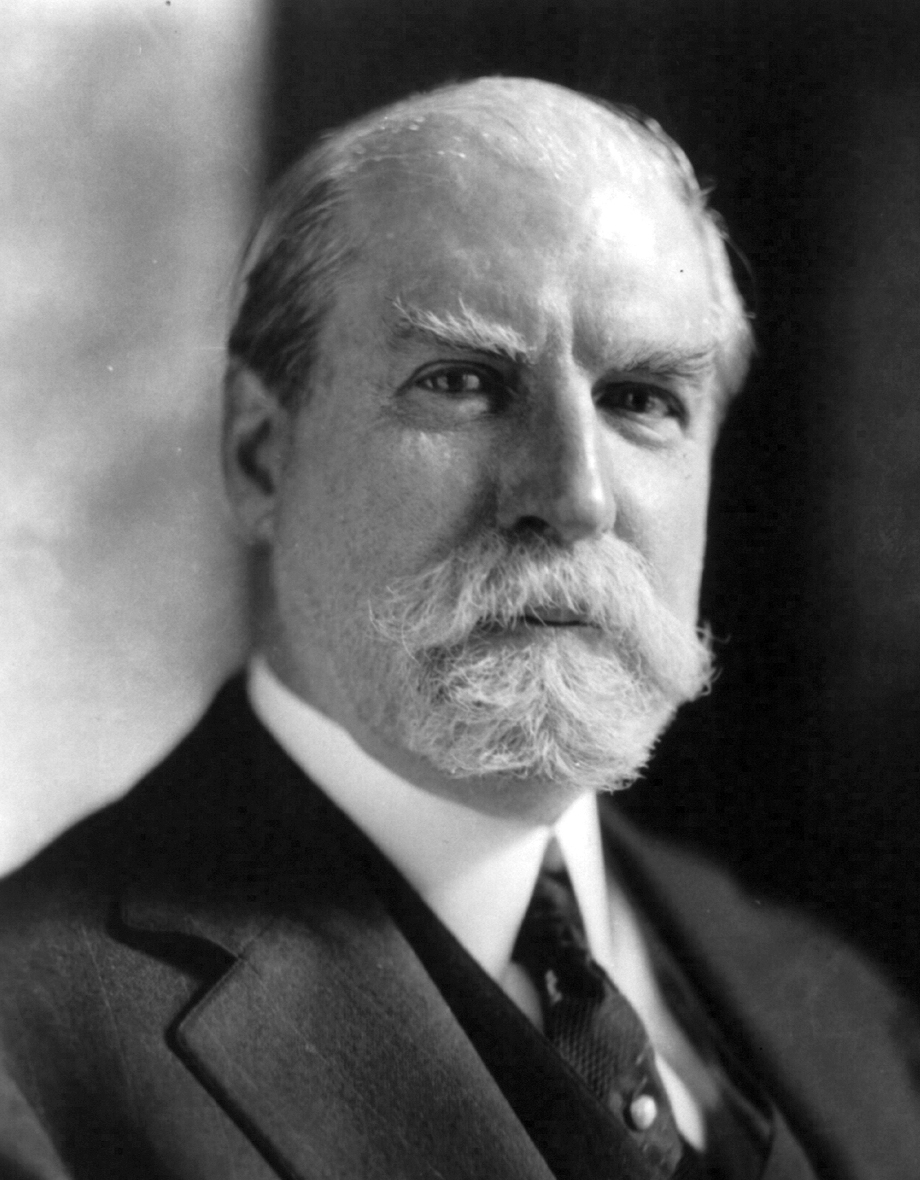
Charles Evans Hughes

- August 3 – Tommy Ryan, American boxing champion (b. 1870)
- August 4 – Mileva Marić, Serbian physicist and mathematician, wife of Albert Einstein (b. 1875)
- August 7 – Charles Bryant, American actor (b. 1879)
- August 10
  - Andrew Brown, Scottish soccer coach (b. 1870)
  - Montague Summers, English writer (b. 1880)
- August 11 – Kan'ichi Asakawa, Japanese historian (b. 1873)
- August 13 – Edwin Maxwell, Irish actor (b. 1886)
- August 16 – Babe Ruth, American baseball player (New York Yankees), MLB Hall of Fame member (b. 1895)
- August 26 – George Anderson, American actor (b. 1886)
- August 27
  - Cissie Cahalan, Irish trade union, feminist and suffragette (b. 1876)
  - Charles Evans Hughes, 11th Chief Justice of the United States, 1916 Republican presidential candidate (b. 1862)
- August 30 – Kristine Bonnevie, Norwegian biologist and politician (b. 1872)
- August 31 – Andrei Zhdanov, Soviet politician (b. 1896)

=== September ===
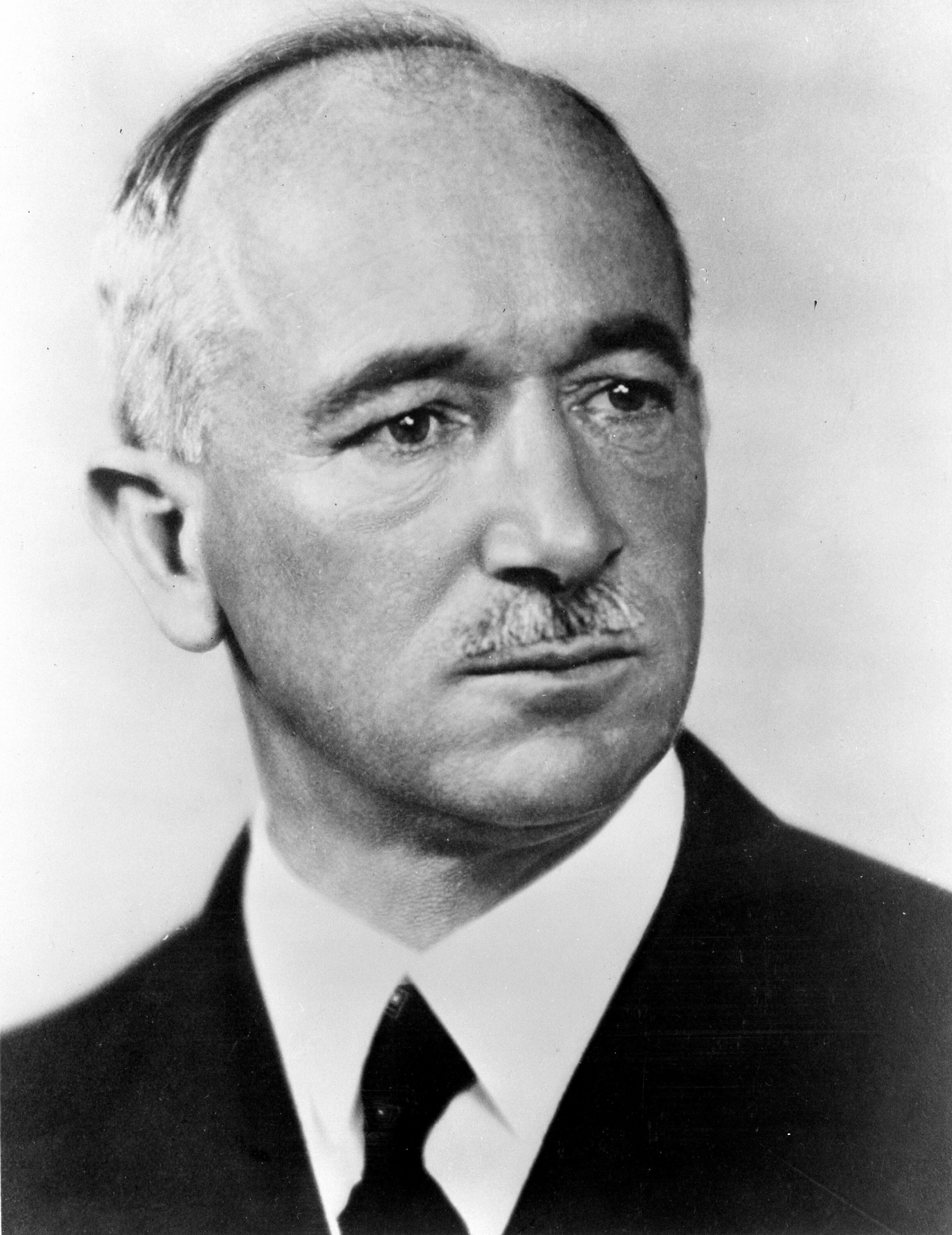
Edvard Beneš

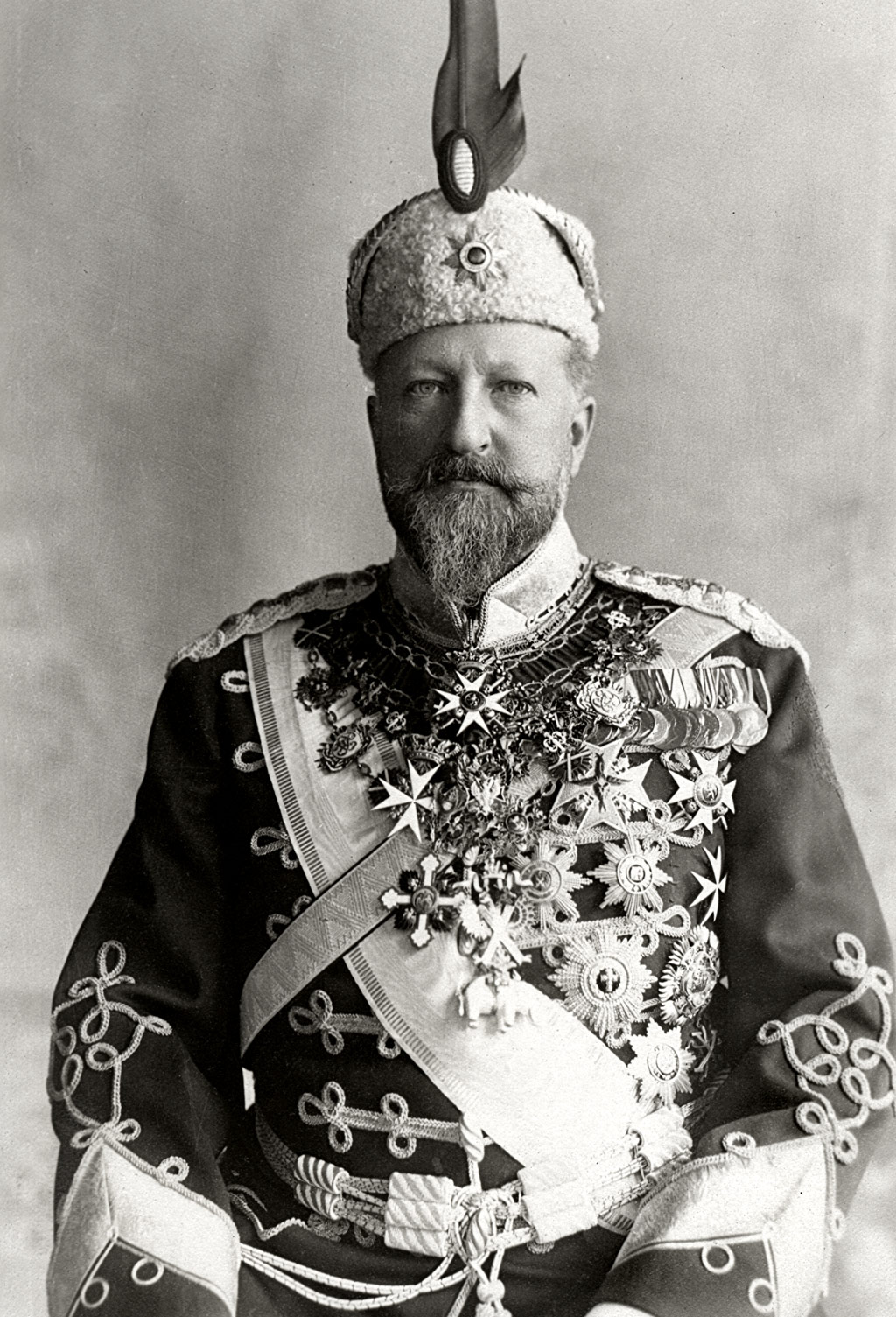
Tsar Ferdinand I of Bulgaria

- September 1
  - Feng Yuxiang, Chinese warlord and general (b. 1882)
  - Moncef Bey, ruler of Tunisia (1942–43) (b. 1881)
  - Charles A. Beard, American historian (b. 1874)
- September 2 – Sylvanus Morley, American scholar, World War I spy (b. 1883)
- September 3 – Edvard Beneš, Czech politician, 4th Prime Minister of Czechoslovakia and 2-time President of Czechoslovakia (b. 1884)
- September 5 – Richard C. Tolman, American mathematical physicist (b. 1881)
- September 7 – André Suarès, French poet, critic (b. 1868)
- September 10 – Tsar Ferdinand I of Bulgaria (b. 1861)
- September 11 – Muhammad Ali Jinnah, founder, first Governor General of Pakistan (b. 1876)
- September 12
  - Rupert D'Oyly Carte, British hotelier, theatre owner and impresario (b. 1876)
  - Carlo Servolini, Italian artist (b. 1876)
- September 13 – Paul Wegener, German actor, film director and screenwriter, a pioneer of German Expressionism (b. 1874)
- September 17
  - Ruth Benedict, American anthropologist, folklorist (b. 1887)
  - Folke Bernadotte, Swedish diplomat (assassinated) (b. 1895)
  - Emil Ludwig, German-born Swiss historian, biographer (b. 1881)
  - Raffaele Rossi, Italian Roman Catholic cardinal, eminence and servant of God (b. 1876)
- September 20 – Husain Salaahuddin, Maldivian writer (b. 1881)
- September 22
  - Prince Adalbert of Prussia (b. 1884)
  - Florence Merriam Bailey, American ornithologist, birdwatcher, and writer (b. 1863)
- September 24 – Warren William, American actor (b. 1894)
- September 26 – Gregg Toland, American cinematographer (b. 1904)
- September 27 – Frank Cellier, British actor (b. 1884)
- September 30
  - Vasily Kachalov, Soviet actor (b. 1875)
  - Edith Roosevelt, First Lady of the United States (b. 1861)

=== October ===
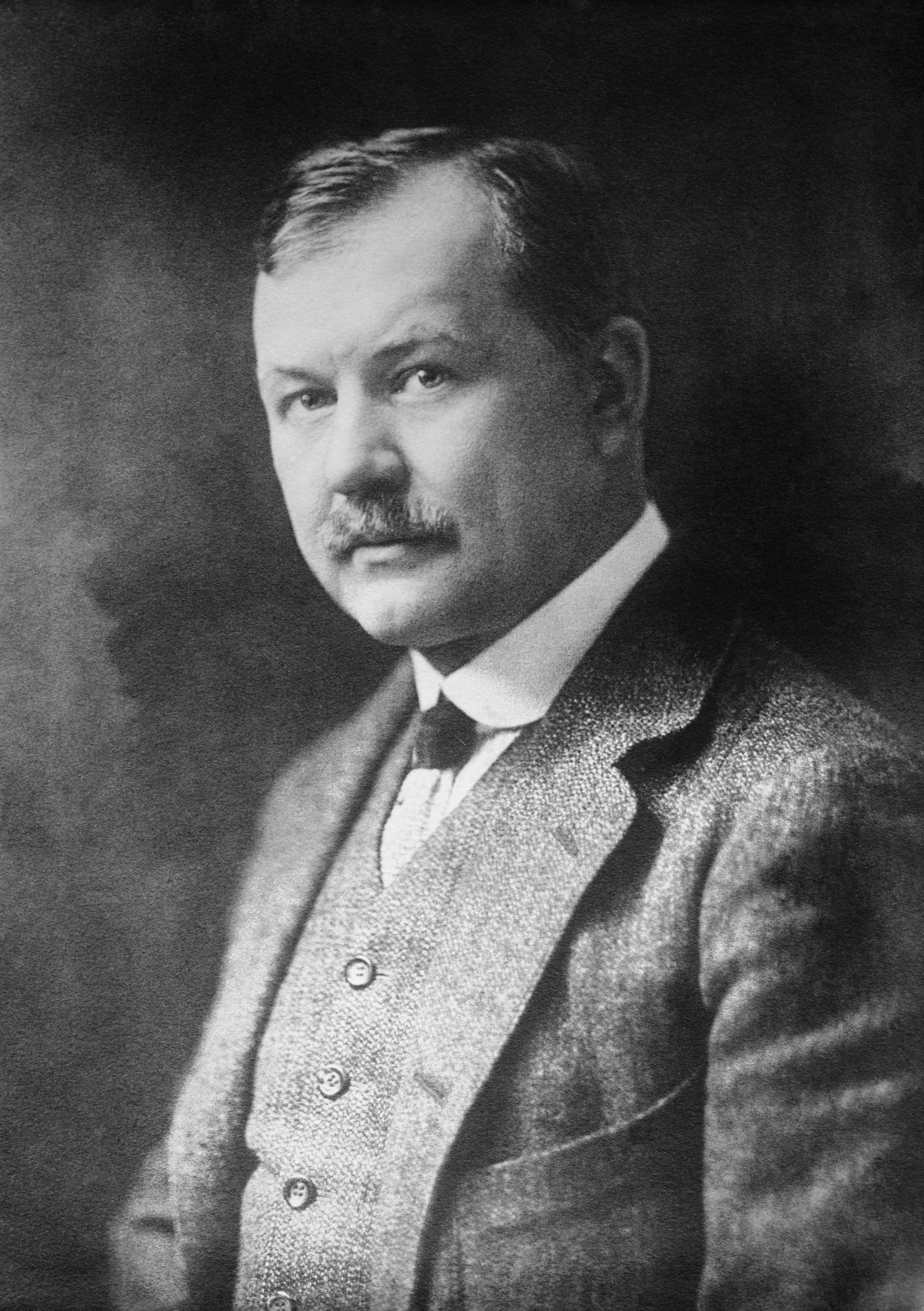
Franz Lehár

- October 1
  - Francisco Rodrigues da Cruz, Portuguese priest (b. 1859)
  - Phraya Manopakorn Nititada, 1st Prime Minister of Siam (b. 1884)
- October 2 – Simon de Graaff, Dutch civil servant, politician (b. 1866)
- October 9 – Edmund Anscombe, New Zealand architect (b. 1874)
- October 12 – Susan Sutherland Isaacs, English educational psychologist and psychoanalyst (b. 1885)
- October 13 – Samuel S. Hinds, American actor (b. 1875)
- October 14 – Dale Fuller, American actress (b. 1885)
- October 15 – Edythe Chapman, American actress (b. 1863)
- October 16 – Friedrich Freiherr Kress von Kressenstein, German general (b. 1870)
- October 18 – Walther von Brauchitsch, German field marshal (b. 1881)
- October 21
  - Elissa Landi, Italian actress (b. 1904)
  - Irving T. Bush, American industrialist (b. 1869)
- October 24 – Franz Lehár, Hungarian composer (b. 1870)
- October 31 – Mary Nolan, American actress (b. 1902)

=== November ===
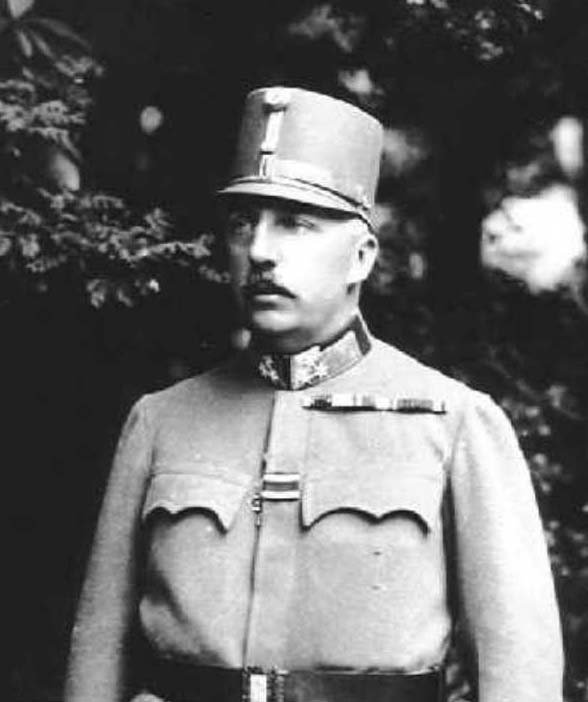
Archduke Peter Ferdinand of Austria

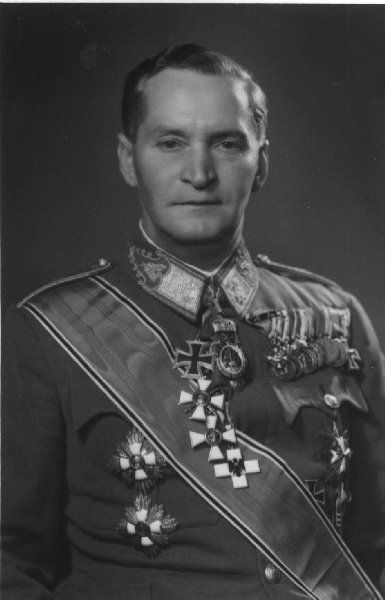
Béla Miklós

- November 4
  - Albert Stanley, 1st Baron Ashfield, British-born American businessman (b. 1874)
  - Filippo Perlo, Italian Roman Catholic prelate and missionary (b. 1873)
- November 7 – David Leland, American actor (b. 1932)
- November 8 – Archduke Peter Ferdinand of Austria (b. 1874)
- November 9 – Edgar Kennedy, American actor (b. 1890)
- November 10
  - Julius Curtius, German politician, diplomat (b. 1877)
  - Jack Nelson, American actor, director (b. 1882)
  - Mikhail Andreyev, Russian ethnographer and linguist (b. 1873)
- November 11
  - Fred Niblo, American film director (b. 1874)
  - Noel Pemberton Billing, British aviator, inventor, publisher and MP (d. 1881)
- November 12 – Umberto Giordano, Italian composer (b. 1867)
- November 17 – Oerip Soemohardjo, Indonesian general (b. 1893)
- November 20 – Robert Mallard, African-American lynching victim (b. 1918)
- November 21 – Béla Miklós, Hungarian military officer, politician and 38th Prime Minister of Hungary (b. 1890)
- November 23
  - Hack Wilson, American baseball player (Chicago Cubs), MLB Hall of Fame member (b. 1900)
  - Uzeyir Hajibeyov, Azerbaijani composer, musicologist and teacher (b. 1885)
- November 27 – Jack Delaney, Canadian boxer (b. 1900)
- November 28 – D. D. Sheehan, Irish politician (b. 1873)
- November 29
  - Maria Koppenhöfer, German actress (b. 1901)
  - Roberto Omegna, Italian cinematographer, director (b. 1876)
- November 30 – Franco Vittadini, Italian composer (b. 1884)

=== December ===
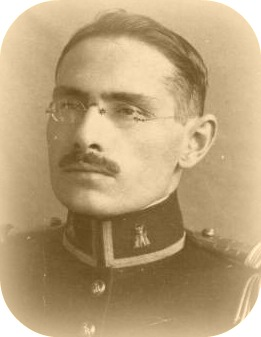
João Tamagnini Barbosa

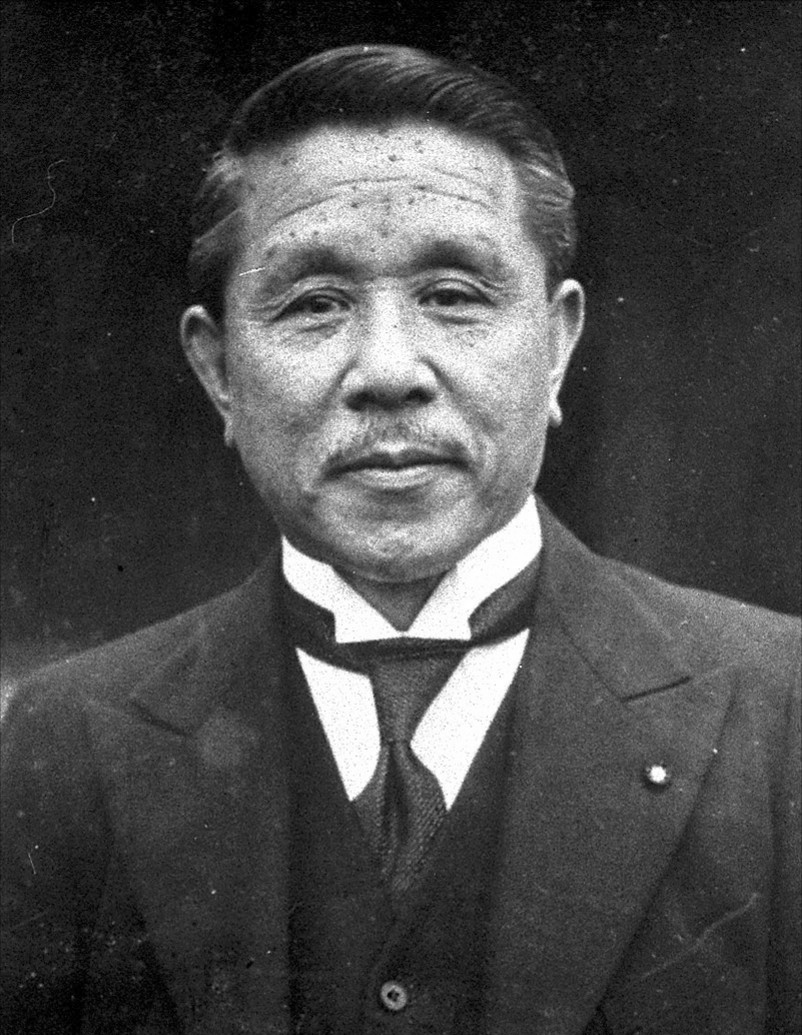
Kōki Hirota

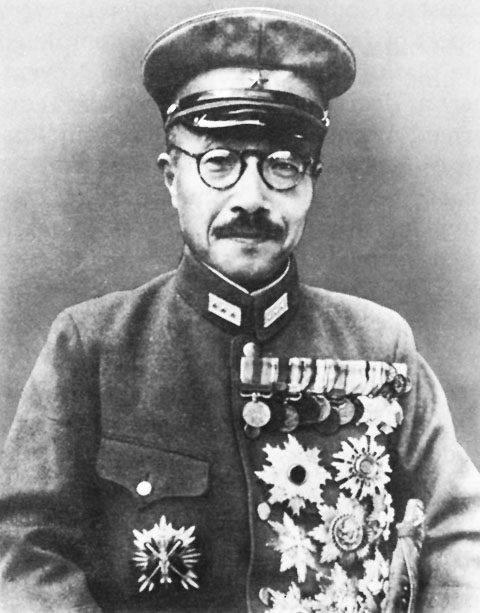
Hideki Tojo

- December 3
  - Jan Hendrik Hofmeyr, South African politician (b. 1894)
  - Luis Orrego Luco, Chilean politician, lawyer, novelist and diplomat (b. 1866)
  - Chano Pozo, Cuban percussionist (b. 1915)
- December 8 – Matthew Charlton, Australian politician (b. 1866)
- December 10 – Na Hyesŏk, Korean feminist, painter, and writer (b. 1896)
- December 12 – Templeton Crocker, American patron and collector (b. 1884)
- December 15 – João Tamagnini Barbosa, Portuguese military officer, politician and 69th Prime Minister of Portugal (b. 1883)
- December 19 – Amir Sjarifuddin, Indonesian politician, journalist, and second prime minister of Indonesia (b. 1907)
- December 20 – C. Aubrey Smith, British actor (b. 1863)
- December 21 – Władysław Witwicki, Polish psychologist, philosopher, translator, historian (of philosophy and art) and artist (b. 1878)
- December 23 – Japanese war leaders (hanged):
  - Kenji Doihara, general (b. 1883)
  - Kōki Hirota, diplomat and politician, 32nd Prime Minister of Japan (b. 1878)
  - Seishirō Itagaki, military officer (b. 1885)
  - Heitarō Kimura, general (b. 1888)
  - Iwane Matsui, general (b. 1878)
  - Akira Mutō, general (b. 1892)
  - Hideki Tojo, general, 40th Prime Minister of Japan (b. 1884)
- December 26
  - John Westley, American actor (b. 1878)
  - Milagros Benet de Mewton, Puerto Rican teacher and suffragist (b. 1868)
- December 28
  - Muhammad Saleh Akbar Hydari, Indian civil servant, politician (b. 1894)
  - Mahmoud an-Nukrashi Pasha, Egyptian political figure, 27th Prime Minister of Egypt (assassinated) (b. 1888)
- December 30
  - George Ault, American painter (b. 1891)
  - Denton Welch, English author and painter (b. 1915)
- December 31 – Sir Malcolm Campbell, English land, water racer (b. 1885)

=== Date Unknown ===
- Frederick J. Bacon, American musician (b. 1871)

== Nobel Prizes ==

- Physics – Patrick Maynard Stuart Blackett
- Chemistry – Arne Tiselius
- Medicine – Paul Hermann Müller
- Literature – T. S. Eliot
- Peace – not awarded
