= Edelweiss (organization) =

Spanish organization

- Founded: 1970
- Founder: Eduardo González Arenas
- Defunct: 1984
- Location: Spain

Edelweiss was an organization, often described as a cult, that existed in Spain from 1970 to 1984. Founded in 1970 by former legionnaire Eduardo González Arenas (Eddie), it operated in Spain as a boy-scouts-like youth organization that actually covered up a network of child sexual abuse. It recruited around 400 children under fake camps, imposing an ideology that blended neo-Nazism, esotericism, and alien worship.

The group taught that women were imperfect and therefore homosexual relationships were ideal; Eddie also claimed he was an alien and was sent to save children from an imminent apocalypse. Edelweiss was dismantled in 1984. There were no trials until 1991, when Eddie and several other members of the group were tried for several counts of corruption of minors. Eddie was sentenced in 1991 to 168 years in prison, with the other defendants sentenced to 14 to 65 years. He served only six and was released in 1997. He then opened a club in Santa Eulària des Riu; he was again arrested for child sexual abuse, but was ordered to be released by the judge a few days later. On 3 September 1998, a year after his release from prison, he was murdered by someone who frequented the same bar.

== In media ==
Edelweiss is a documentary series created and directed in 2021 by Eulogio Romero for Radio Televisión Española in which, in addition to chronologically reviewing its history, some of its members, researchers or journalists express the testimony of their experiences.
