= Life and Death of a Spanish Town =

1937 book by Elliot Paul

- First edition
- Author: Elliot Paul
- Language: English
- Genre: Modern History
- Publisher: Random House Publishers
- Publication date: 1937
- Publication place: United States
- Media type: Print (hardcover)
- Pages: 427 (first edition)

Life and Death of a Spanish Town is a book by Elliot Paul based on his actual experiences of living in the town of Santa Eulària des Riu on the Spanish island of Ibiza, at the outbreak of the Spanish Civil War. The book was published in 1937 by Random House Inc, of New York.

== Format ==
The book starts with a list of the Men and Women of Santa Eulalia. The story is then presented in two parts. The first is titled 4000 BC to 1936 AD, with the second part called July 14 to September 15, 1936. There is also a postscript by Paul, dated 14 June 1937.

== Synopsis ==
The book is set in and around the small town of Santa Eulària des Riu, on Ibiza, where Paul had lived since 1931.

The first part of the book describes the town and many of the characters who live and work there. He details their family lives, their hopes, their aspirations, and their politics. He provides details of the people at work and at play and describes how he becomes part of the community of the town. Paul also writes of other expatriates who have made their homes in and around the town.

The second part of the book starts with Paul and his family returning to Ibiza after some time away. The narrative is set in 1936 in the week leading up to the outbreak of hostilities on Ibiza during the Spanish Civil War and describes the events that eventually lead to Paul, his family and other refugees from the violence, fleeing the island. It tells the story of civil disobedience, collaboration, and the violence that split a once-happy community, but the narrative finishes before the tragic turn of events reaches its conclusion.

The postscript, written by Paul, dated 14 June 1937, details events following his departure from Ibiza and describes his hopes and fears for his friends on the island and a way of life that he thought would change forever.

== Contents ==
=== The Characters ===
==== The Fishermen and their Families ====
- Captain Juan
- Mateo Rosa, His Wife Paja, their daughter Maria
- Edmundo, Mateo’s brother
- Toniet Pardal, his wife and children

==== Hotel and Café keepers ====
- Cosmi, his wife Anna
- Antonio the cook, Cosmi’s brother
- Catalina, servant in Cosmi’s hotel
- Juanito, young proprietor of the Royalty
- Pedro, the waiter at the Royalty
- Xumeu Ribas, proprietor of Can Xumeu and custodian of the public telephone, his wife and daughter
- Francisco Ribas, Xumeu’s son
- Antonia, proprietress of the fisherman’s bar
- Julia her daughter
- Andres, of Can Andres

==== Storekeepers ====
- Old Jaun, of the Casa Rosita, his on Mariano, his daughter-in-law Vicenta
- Toni Ferrer, of Las Delicias
- Miguel Tur, of the Casa Miguel
- Guarapiñada, of Tot Barat
- Mousson, the butcher, his daughter Catalina, his blind aunt

==== Artisans and Mechanics ====
- Guillermo, the blacksmith
- Sindik, the carpenter
- Jaun Sindik, his son
- Jaume, the carpenter
- Primitivo, the electrician
- Bonéd, Fascist mason
- Vicente Cruz, younge republican mason
- Ramon, the bus driver

==== The Priest ====
- Old Father Coll
- Father Torres
- Father Margall, and assisting on holidays, Father Clapés and the priest who looked like a butcher boy
- The San Carlos priest and his father

==== Officials and Guardias ====
- Mayor Serra, Republican
- The Fascist Mayor
- The Secretario
- Anfita, the postmaster, his two idiot sons, Pepe and Chicul
- Sergeant Gomez, of the Guardia Civil
- Guardias Ferrer, Jiminez and Bravo
- The Portero
- Ex-Captain Nicolau, retired army officer
- Fernando, a schoolmaster
- Carlos, his cousin, also a schoolmaster

==== Farmers and Landowners ====
- Pep Salvador, Cosmi’s brother
- Pere des Puig
- José and Catalina, of Can Josepi
- Francisco Guasch
- José Ribas, the diving champion
- Don Ignacio Riquer
- Don Carlos Roman
- Don Rafael Sainz, vacationing banking millionaire
- Pep des Horts (Algot Lange), the Dane

==== The Banker ====
- Don Abel Matutes

==== Artists ====
- Andres, the young socialist
- Rigoberto Soler
- Derek Rogers, English painter

==== Woman and Young Girls ====
- Eulalia Noguera
- Marie Anfita, the postmans daughter
- Teresa Bonéd, her daughter Juana
- Maruja, the Secretario’s daughter
- Odila, Ex-Captain Nicolaus daughter
- Angeles, granddaughter of old Vicent the mason
- Maria, Pep Salvador’s favourite daughter
- Marguerita, fiancée of Fernando the schoolmaster

==== Military Officers and Militiamen ====
- Captain Don Alfredo Bayo, leader of government expedition
- Captain Pastor, second in command
- El Cubano, a corporal
- Maño, a militiaman
- Pedro, Maño comrade
- Ex-Commandant Mestres, rebel Governor of the island

=== Part 1 ===
==== 4000 BC to 1936 AD ====
- I. Dawn and Moonlight
- II. Of Fish and Fishermen
- III. The Morning Bus
- IV. Stores and Storekeepers
- V. The Church
- VI. Cosmi and the Punta de Arabie
- VII. Of Farms and Farmers
- VIII. A Group in the Main Street
- IX. The Back Street
- X. Of Public Service
- XI. Les Jeunes Filles en Fleur
- XII. The Guardia Civil
- XIII. Communists, Fascists, and Others

=== Part 2 ===
==== July 14 to September 15, 1936 ====
- XIV. The Barcelona Boat
- XV. An Airplane
- XVI. The Manifesto
- XVII. The Fleet
- XVIII. The Man Hunt
- XIX. The Bombardment
- XX. Victory
- XXI. The Internationale
- XXII. Dios Foutut
- XXIII. La Lutte Finale
- XXIV. Maño
- XXV. Shadows of Vultures
- Postscript

== Reviews ==
The book was praised by Richard Rees, editor of The Adelphi magazine, who called it, along with George Orwell's Homage to Catalonia and Georges Bernanos's Les grands cimetières sous la lune, one of "the only books about Spain that can be said to be written by people with free (i.e. fundamentally honest, if often mistaken ) minds".
