= Open Mind =

Open Mind may refer to:

- Open Mind (album), by Jean-Luc Ponty
- Open Mind (horse), an American Thoroughbred
- The Open Mind (band), a British psychedelic rock group
- The Open Mind (TV series), a public affairs talk show
- Open Mind Common Sense, an artificial intelligence project
- Open Mind Productions, a British television production company
- Open-mindedness, the psychological concept
- Monsieur Ouine, a novel by Georges Bernanos, known as The Open Mind in one translation
- Open Mind (journal), a cognitive science journal
