= Es Figueral =

- Village
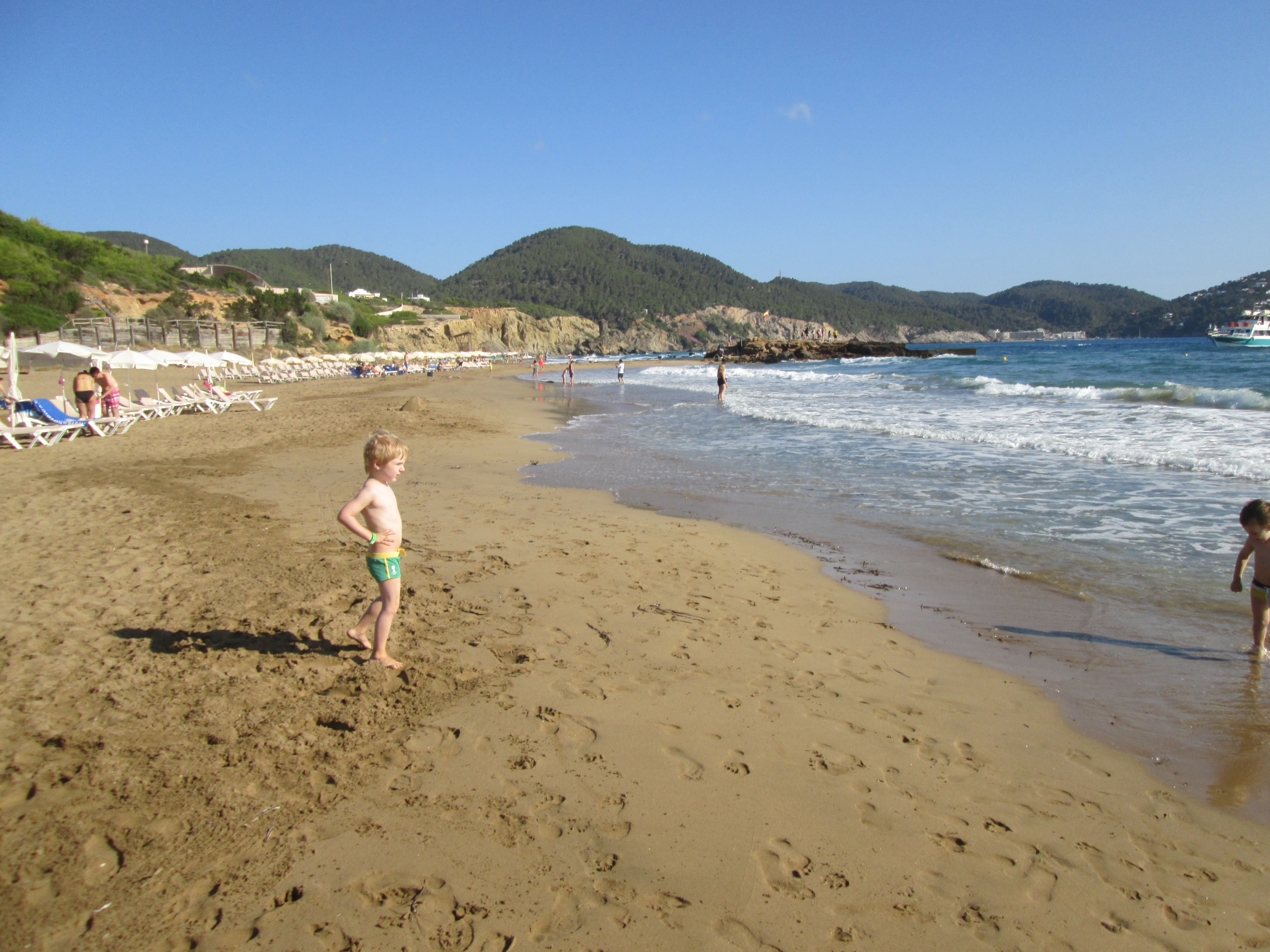
- The beach in 2014

- Location of the village in Ibiza
- Coordinates: 39°3′4″N 1°35′34″E
- Country: Spain
- Region: Balearic Islands
- Time zone: UTC+1 (CET)
  - Summer (DST): UTC+2 (CEST)

Es Figueral is a small resort village and beach on the northeastern coast of Ibiza, near the Illa de Tagomago. The village, is part of the city of Santa Eularia des Riu.
