= Laureano Barrau =

Spanish painter (1863-1957)

Solitude. 1891. 56 × 41.5 cm. Museu Nacional d'Art de Catalunya

Laureano Barrau Buñol (1863, Barcelona – 21 October 1957, Santa Eulària des Riu) was a Spanish impressionist painter.

== Education ==
Barrau began his education in Barcelona, his native city. Later, he studied in Madrid, finding the Spanish old masters. At 20, Barrau went to Paris and enrolled at the Académie des Beaux-Arts where Gerome was his tutor. Two years later, Barrau won the Prix de Rome in Barcelona. This afforded him the opportunity to study the great Italian masters for three years.

== Career ==
When he was 28, Barrau was given the title of Societaire (Member) of the Salon de la Nationales des Beaux-Arts de Paris. He earned medals in the principal cities in Europe and today his paintings hang in museums in Spain, Paris, Brussels, Buenos Aires, Montevideo and Rio de Janeiro.

At age 47, Barrau moved to picturesque Ibiza. He settled with his wife in the town of Santa Eulalia del Rio, where he painted what is considered his best work.

== End of life ==
He remained in Santa Eulalia for the rest of his life. He died in 1957 at the age of 94 and is buried in the cemetery in Santa Eulalia.

== Legacy ==
Réalisation cover for French magazine Figaro Illustré August 1897 In 1963, Barrau's wife opened a museum which houses approximately two hundred of his paintings. It is located at Puig da Missa on Santa Eulalia beside the 400-year-old church. The museum was later donated to the village but its ownership is debated.
