= Joy (Bernanos novel) =

1929 novel by Georges Bernanos

- Title page for Joy English translated version (1946)
- Author: Georges Bernanos
- Original title: La Joie
- Translator: Louise Varèse
- Language: French
- Publisher: Plon
- Publication date: 1929
- Publication place: France
- English publication date: 1946
- Pages: 317

Joy (French: La Joie) is a 1929 novel by the French writer Georges Bernanos. The story is set among people with shattered dreams and follows a young woman who is defined by youthfulness and joy. The book was awarded the Prix Femina. It was published in English in 1946 in a translation by Louise Varèse.

== Reception ==
Franz Carl Weiskopf wrote in The Saturday Review: "If you wish an exalted tale, brilliant dialogue, and fervent description of mystical ecstasies, then Joy is the right kind of book for you. If you don't, even a magnificent literary craftsmanship and an extraordinary power of language will not compensate you for the lack of contact with the author's emotions and thoughts."
