= Night Is Darkest =

Book by Georges Bernanos

- First English-language edition
- Author: Georges Bernanos
- Original title: Un mauvais rêve
- Translator: W. J. Strachan
- Language: French
- Publisher: Plon
- Publication date: 1950
- Publication place: France
- English publication date: 1953, Bodley Head
- Pages: 359

Night Is Darkest is a novel by the French writer Georges Bernanos, published posthumously in 1950. Its French title is Un mauvais rêve which means "a bad dream". It tells the story of a writer who is out of ideas and has lost his motivation. The book was published in English in 1953, translated by W. J. Strachan.

== Reception ==
R. D. Charques reviewed the book in The Spectator:

Un Mauvais Reve, a posthumous work, now translated under the title of Night is Darkest, leaves an unhappy impression. In the figure of the novelist Emmanuel Ganse, a latter-day Balzac, who has pretty well exhausted himself as a writer and who keeps going only with the aid of three secretaries, Bernanos seems cruelly bent on guying himself. His honesty here, however, is swamped by the exacerbated preoccupation with contemporary literary names, jobs and reputations and by the arbitrary violences of behaviour of the sickly and sinister trio of secretaries.
