= The Crime (novel) =

1935 novel by Georges Bernanos

The Crime (French: Un crime) is a 1935 novel by the French writer Georges Bernanos. It has also been published as A Crime. The novel is a detective story that was written for commercial prospects.

== Publication ==
The book was published by Plon in 1935. An English translation by Anne Green was published in 1936 under the title A Crime. It was republished in 1946 with the title changed to The Crime.

== Reception ==
Kenneth D. Whitehead writes in the Encyclopedia of Catholic Social Thought, Social Science, and Social Policy: "Although the book contains unmistakable Bernanosian themes and treatments, it is not one of the author's best or most characteristic novels." Marine de Tilly of Le Point reviewed the book in 2011: "Between detective novel and spiritual adventure, between the lyricism of the language and the discomfort caused by the investigation, Bernanos leads us to the end by the end of the nose."
