= The Impostor (novel) =

The Impostor (French: L'Imposture) is a 1927 novel by the French writer Georges Bernanos. It tells the story of a priest who loses his faith and sets out to rediscover his soul together with an elderly cleric.

== Reception ==
Publishers Weekly wrote in 1999: "Austere, intellectually challenging and, occasionally, achingly poignant in the tradition of French-Catholic mysticism, the novel achieves a certain quiet spiritual triumph, a faith-at-low-ebb form made popular in the English-speaking world by The Power and the Glory." Kirkus Reviews called the book "An often maddeningly discursive work that, nevertheless, accumulates great power in a devastating portrayal of a tormented soul that itself becomes a tormentor."
