= Les grands cimetières sous la lune =

Book by Georges Bernanos

A Diary of My Times
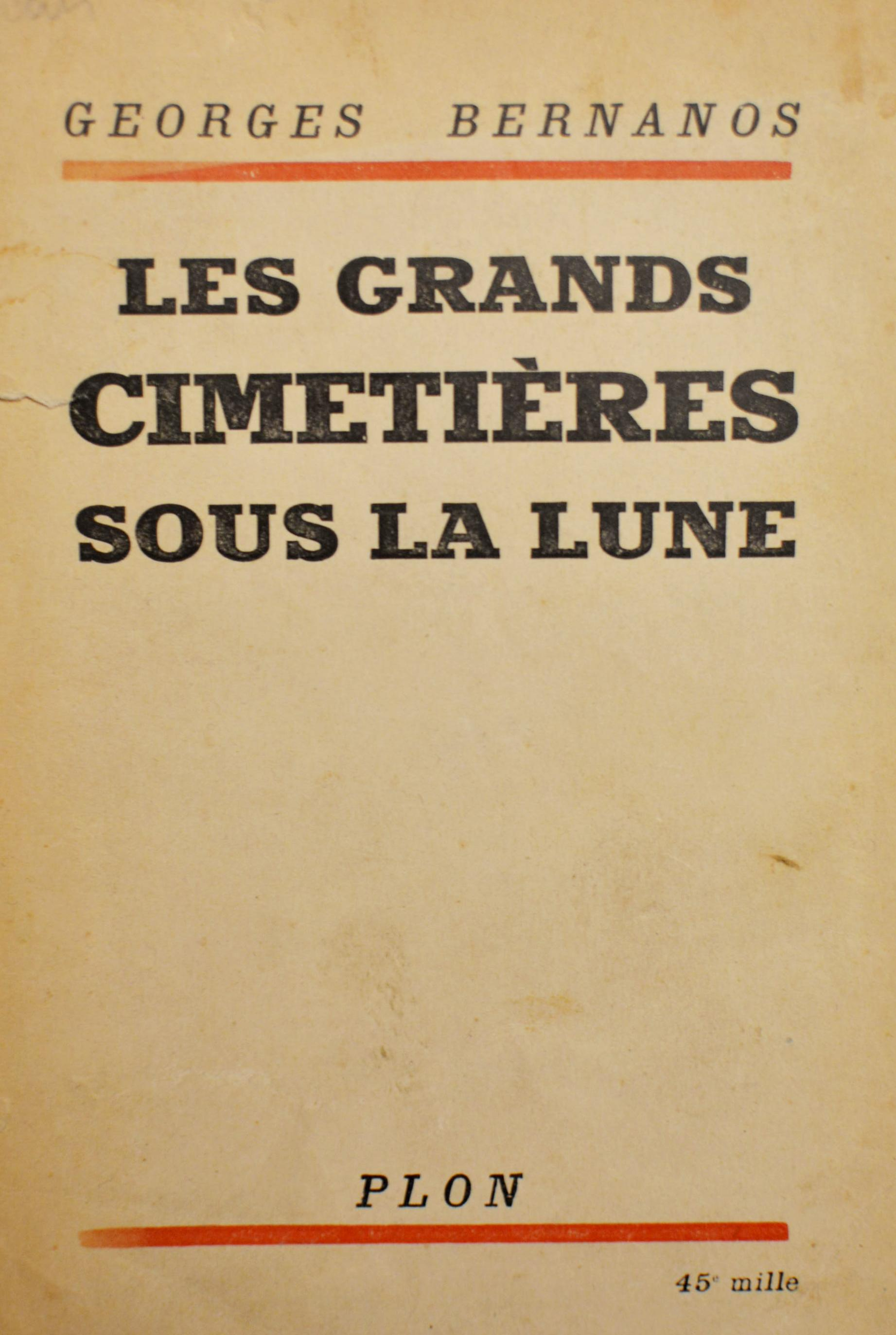
- French edition
- Author: Georges Bernanos
- Original title: Les Grands Cimetières sous la Lune
- Language: French

Les Grands Cimetières sous la Lune (1938; English: literally, The Great Cemeteries Under the Moon, English title when published; A Diary of My Times) is a book by novelist Georges Bernanos which fiercely condemns the atrocities carried out in Majorca by the Nationalists in Spain. Majorca had been secured for the Nationalist rebels by Manuel Goded Llopis at the outset of the Spanish Civil War. Bernanos states that 3,000 were killed by Nationalists and his book contains horrifying details of summary executions. "When the Spanish war broke out, Bernanos had been living for more than a year in Palma, Majorca, in very difficult circumstances, and suffering from the after-effects of a motor-cycle accident. It was in Majorca that Bernanos watched civil war, or rather - since the island fell almost at once into the hands of the Fascists - watched terrorism eating its slow way into this little middle-class and peasant community."

Bernanos in English translation from the French: "The population of Majorca has always been noted for its absolute indifference to politics. In the days of the Carlistes and the Cristinos, George Sand tells us how they welcomed with equal unconcern the refugees of either side. According to the head of the Phalange, you could not have found a hundred Communists in the whole island. 'There was killing in Spain,' you say. 'A hundred and thirty-five political assassinations between March and July 1936.' But in Majorca there were no crimes to avenge, so it could only have been a preventative action, the systematic extermination of suspects. The majority of legal sentences - I shall refer later to the executions without trial, of which there were many more - were merely for desafeccion al movimento salvador: Disloyalty to the Salvation movement, expressed in words or gestures alone."

According to the historian Antony Beevor, the publication of the book in 1938, "which described the nationalist terror on Majorca, greatly strengthened the liberal Catholic reaction against the Church's official support for Franco." Writing in 1938, Richard Rees named it, along with George Orwell's Homage to Catalonia and Elliot Paul's Life and Death of a Spanish Town, amongst, "the only books about Spain that can be said to be written by people with free (i.e. fundamentally honest, if often mistaken) minds."

== See also ==
- White Terror (Spain)
- Red Terror (Spain)
