= Mouchette =

1967 film by Robert Bresson

- Film poster
- Directed by: Robert Bresson
- Screenplay by: Robert Bresson
- Based on: Mouchette; 1937 novel by Georges Bernanos
- Produced by: Anatole Dauman
- Starring: Nadine Nortier; Jean-Claude Guilbert; Marie Cardinal; Paul Hébert
- Cinematography: Ghislain Cloquet
- Edited by: Raymond Lamy
- Music by: Jean Wiener; Claudio Monteverdi
- Distributed by: UGC / CFDC
- Release date: 26 October 1967
- Running time: 81 min.
- Country: France
- Language: French

Mouchette (pronounced [mu.ʃɛt]) is a 1967 French tragedy film directed by Robert Bresson, starring Nadine Nortier and Jean-Claude Guilbert. It is based on the novel of the same name by Georges Bernanos. Bresson explained his choice of the novel, saying, "I found neither psychology or analysis in it. The substance of the book seemed usable. It could be sieved."

It was entered into the 1967 Cannes Film Festival, winning the OCIC Award (International Catholic Organization for Cinema and Audiovisual).

Mouchette is set in a rural French village and follows the daughter of a bullying father and dying mother. Unfolding in the director's famously sparse and minimalist style, Bresson said that its titular character "offers evidence of misery and cruelty. She is found everywhere: wars, concentration camps, tortures, assassinations."

Mouchette is among Bresson's more acclaimed films. The Criterion Collection DVD release includes a trailer for the film, made by Jean-Luc Godard. The Artificial Eye DVD release includes a 29 minute documentary filmed on set about the making of the film. (Note: The German documentary, Zum Beispiel Bresson, states that Nadine Nortier was aged 18 at the time of filming, working as a bank clerk in Paris, and her real name was not Nortier.)

== Plot ==
Mouchette, whose name means "little fly", lives in an isolated French village with her father and bedridden, dying mother, taking care of her infant brother and doing all the housework. She is ostracised at school for her bedraggled clothes and chastised by her teacher for refusing to sing.

Once, in contrast to the misery of her daily life, Mouchette goes to a fair, where a kind woman buys Mouchette a token so she can ride on the bumper cars. She and a young man bump into each other's cars as a mutual flirtation. Before she can speak to the boy after the ride, her father takes Mouchette away.

Walking home from school one day, Mouchette gets lost in the woods when a rainstorm begins. Arsène, an alcoholic epileptic poacher, stumbles upon her and takes her to his hut. He fears he has killed a man with whom he had fought earlier, and attempts to use Mouchette as an alibi to clear him of the blame. He suffers a seizure, and she tends to him gently. When he comes to, she admits seeing him wound and possibly kill the gamekeeper, and she pushes him to get out of the hut, but Arsène captures her and rapes her. By early morning, Mouchette has escaped. Returning home, she feeds her crying hungry baby brother with a bottle of milk, then changes his nappy, as her weak bedbound mother instructs. She tries to sleep but awakens, crying. Her baby brother wakes up crying again, so she tries to soothe him in her arms. Her mother requests a bottle of gin to die without pain. She tries to talk to her mother but finds her dead. Her verbally-abusive father returns. On her way to get milk, a shopkeeper offers her a free coffee and croissant. The shopkeeper notices a scratch on Mouchette’s chest and when Mouchette accidentally breaks the coffee bowl, calls her a "little slut". Elderly women dressed in black are going to church.

Later, when talking to the gamekeeper Mathieu and his wife about the events of the previous night in the woods, she tries to offer the story agreed with Arsène. Reluctantly, she states that she was at Arsène's house through the night because he is her lover. Finally, she is invited into the house of an elderly woman, who gives her a dress to wear at the funeral and a shroud to cover her mother. The woman speaks to her about worshipping the dead and gives Mouchette three nice dresses that will fit. On her way out, Mouchette insults her and stains her carpet. Mouchette then witnesses hunters shooting and killing rabbits. Another rabbit is wounded and cannot hop. Mouchette looks shocked by the horror she witnesses. She clutches one of the dresses by the river then rolls down a hill with it. She continues to roll down the hill several times, her clothes soiling, until she splashes into the river, and does not return.

== Cast ==
Besides his preference for non-professional actors, Bresson liked to cast actors he had never used before. The one major exception is Jean-Claude Guilbert, who had the role of Arnold in Au hasard Balthazar, and plays Arsène in this film.

Actor	Role
Nadine Nortier	Mouchette
Jean-Claude Guilbert	Arsène
Marie Cardinal	Mother
Paul Hébert	Father
Jean Vimenet	Mathieu
Marie Susini	Mathieu's wife
Suzanne Huguenin	Layer-out of the Dead
Marine Trichet	Louisa
Raymonde Chabrun	Grocer

== Reception and legacy ==
=== Critical response ===
In 1967, Mouchette won the OCIC Award (International Catholic Organization for Cinema and Audiovisual) at the Cannes Film Festival, and the Pasinetti Award at the Venice Film Festival.

On the review aggregator website Rotten Tomatoes, 90% of 29 critics' reviews are positive, with an average rating of 7.8/10. The website's consensus reads: "Remarkable not only as a viewing experience, but as a showcase for Robert Bresson's tremendous skill, Mouchette underpins its grim narrative with devastating grace." In The Spectator, the critic Penelope Houston highlighted the excellence of Nadine Nortier's performance as Mouchette, writing that, as a consequence, "the whole film becomes luminous, transparent, bafflingly effortless", resulting in "a kind of perfection". Noting the lack of sentimentality or sadism in Bresson's portrayal of Mouchette's suffering, Houston writes that "Mouchette is not a child for anyone's pity, except, in both senses, her creator's." She concludes that "Like Au Hasard, Balthazar, Mouchette is a deeply pessimistic film which somehow leaves one in a mood close to exhilaration. It is conceived, if you like, as a religious experience in which the heroine is not a saint, and in which there is no conventional religious reference."

The film director Wim Wenders praised the film in a review, writing "Around seventy years ago, someone built for the first time a film camera. He made images move in succession, such that later on, he recognized on a screen something he had already seen through the lens: a head turning, clouds moving across the sky, blades of grass trembling, a face expressing pain or joy. He would have understood Bresson's film Mouchette. He would have rejoiced in the fact that he had invented something that was used in such an incredibly beautiful way."

=== Legacy ===
Mouchette is considered by many critics to be among Bresson's best films. The Swedish director Ingmar Bergman reportedly praised and loved the film. Russian film-maker Andrei Tarkovsky listed the film as one of the ten favorite movies of all time. The American filmmaker Wes Anderson praised the film, calling it "terrific". Sight & Sound's critics’ poll placed Mouchette in its top 20 in 1972, and in the magazine's 2012 poll of the greatest films of all time Mouchette placed 107th in the directors' poll and 117th in the critics' poll. The film ranked joint 243rd in the 2022 Sight & Sound critics’ poll, tied with 21 other films.

== See also ==
- Slow cinema
- Minimalist film
