= Mouchette (novel) =

1937 novel by Georges Bernanos

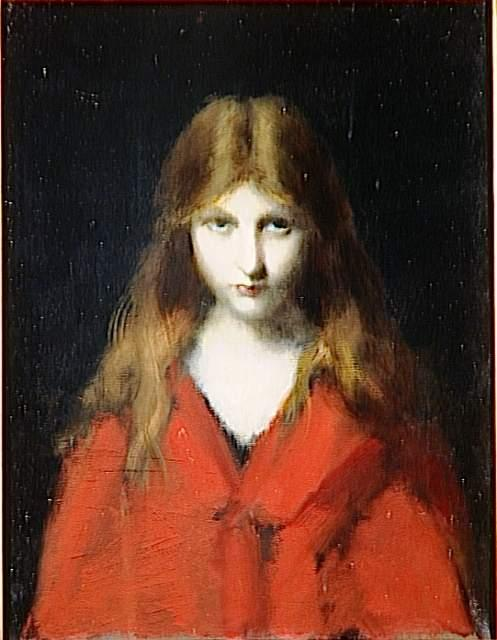
- Mouchette
- Author: Georges Bernanos
- Original title: Nouvelle histoire de Mouchette
- Language: French
- Publisher: Plon
- Publication date: 1937
- Publication place: France
- English publication date: 1966
- Pages: 223

Mouchette (French: Nouvelle histoire de Mouchette) is a 1937 novel by the French writer Georges Bernanos. It tells the story of a 14-year-old peasant girl who is raped and has a number of humiliating encounters. The novel's theme of misery was inspired by Bernanos' experiences from the Spanish Civil War. The book was published in English in 1966, translated by J.C. Whitehouse.

== Reception ==
Harry T. Moore wrote in The Saturday Review in 1966: "Somewhat less rhetorical than his other work, it is more generally poetic in style, at least in this translation by J.C. Whitehouse. But even here Bernanos indulges his habit of interrupting the narrative to make comments ... Mouchette nevertheless comes through as a strong novel, which above all shows that evil is the absence of good (or God)."

== Adaptation ==
The novel was the basis for Robert Bresson's 1967 film Mouchette.
