= S'Argamassa Roman Fish Farm =

Ancient Roman fish farm

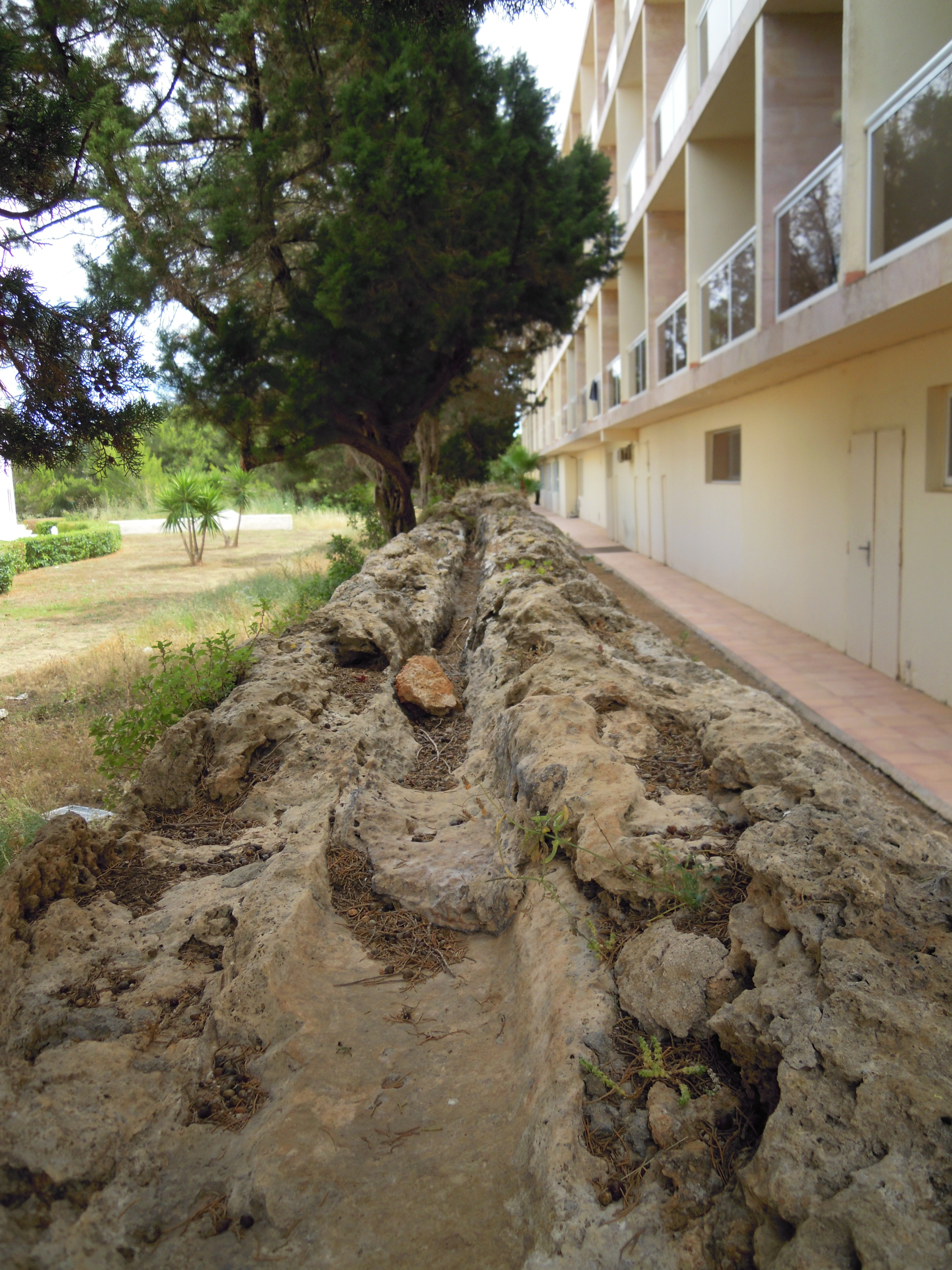
- The remains of the Roman stone aqueduct at s'Argamassa, Santa Eulèria
- Interactive map of S'Argamassa Roman Fish Farm
- Type: Roman Fish Farm
- Location: 38°59′27″N 1°34′14″E
- Region: Ibiza

History
- Built: circa 146 BC
- Built by: Roman

Site notes
- Length: 425 m (1,394 ft)
- Condition: Ruins
- Management: Consell d'Eivissa
- Public access: Anytime

S'Argamassa Roman Fish Farm can be found 2.8 miles (4.5 km) eastwards along the coast from the town of Santa Eulària des Riu on the Spanish island of Ibiza. It is in the municipality of Santa Eulària des Riu. The Romans built this fish farm and connecting aqueduct following their occupation of the island in 146 BC.

== History and location ==
The Romans arrived to occupy the island of Ibiza after defeating and destroying Carthaginian Empire in 146 BC. The island was granted confederate status within the Roman Empire and was known as Ebusus Federatae Civitae (Federation city of Ibiza). As a result of this, the island's economy experienced a huge boost. Salt mining and agricultural activities brought great wealth to the island during this time.

=== Fishing industry ===
The island's economy also saw a huge growth in its fishing industry. The fishing technique of almadraba was used in the seas around the island. This used a labyrinth of nets and approximately fifty boats which channelled huge schools of fish, tuna being the main catch, into a holding area. The fish were then culled and dragged aboard the fishing boats. However these catches were so bountiful that not all the fish were killed. Some of the fish were kept alive in aquatic enclosures such as this one, along with a fish processing plant, built by the Romans at S'Argamassa.

=== Aqueduct ===
Leading to the processing plant on the coast, the Romans constructed an aqueduct to carry fresh clean water from a nearby stream to the processing plant. Part of this aqueduct can still be seen today. The conduit is built from large limestone slabs with a channel carved into the top surface. It is rather neglected these days but a 425-metre (1,394 ft) run of it can still be seen as it runs down to the coast alongside a modern hotel complex.

=== Production ===
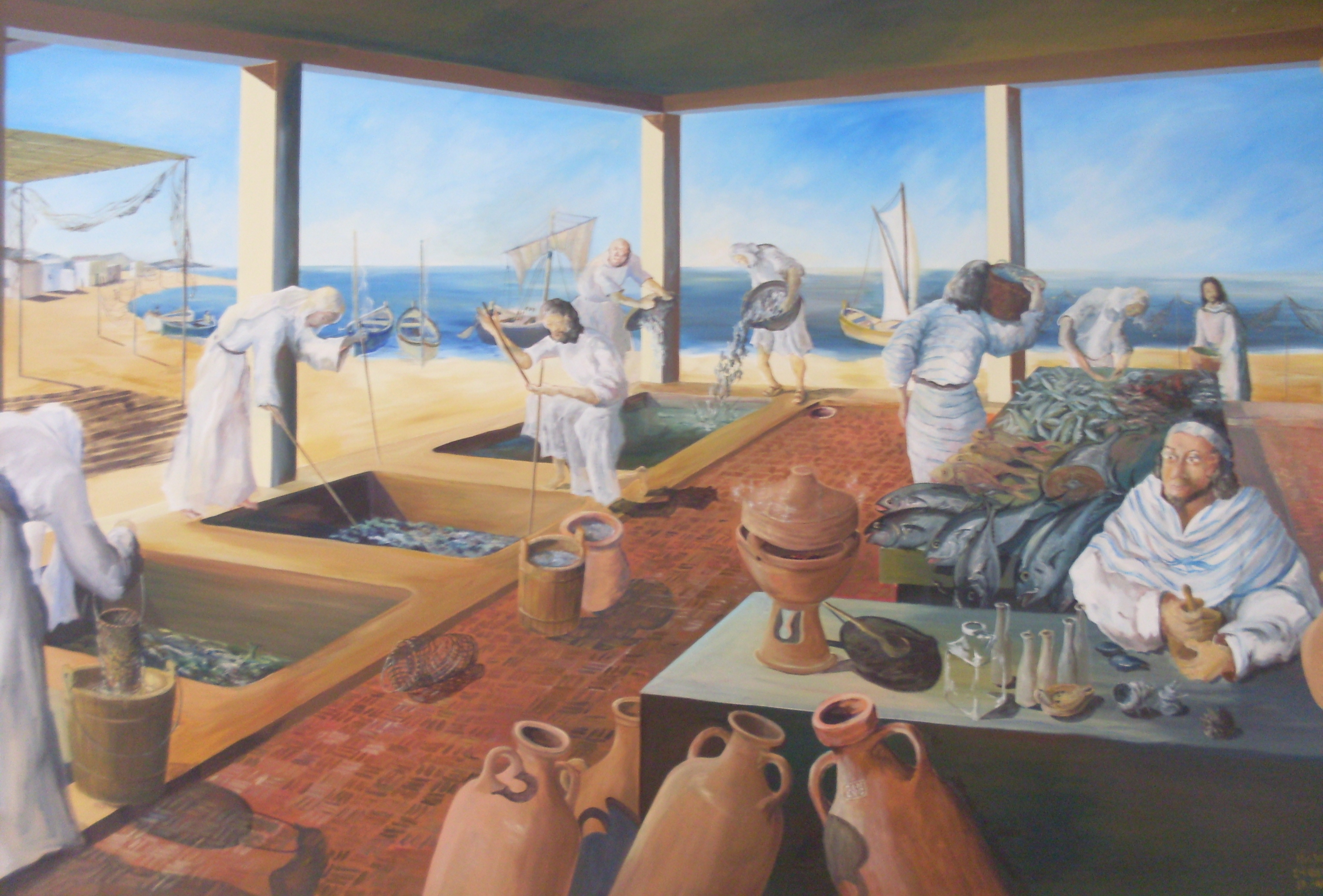
What the processing plant at S'Argamassa may have looked like

When the fish surplus was brought to S'Argamassa, it was dealt with in two ways. The fish was filleted and then dried and salted. This product was called Salazón. The byproduct of the filleting process was used to produce the Roman delicacy of garum. Garum is a fish sauce which was consumed in great amounts in the Roman Empire. The heads, tails, gills, innards of the fish were first boiled and then macerated in salt, and cured in the sun for one to three months. The mixture fermented and liquefied in the dry warmth, with the salt inhibiting the common agents of decay. Garum was the clear liquid that formed on the top, drawn off by means of a fine strainer inserted into the fermenting vessel. The sediment or sludge that remained was allec. Concentrated decoctions of aromatic herbs might be added. Flavours would vary according to the locale, with ingredients sometimes from in-house gardens.

=== Fermentation tanks ===
At the end of the run of the aqueduct close to the shoreline there are the remains of rectangular structures which were once the fermenting tanks for the production of the garum. On completion of the process the sauce was packed into enormous earthenware storage jars called amphoras, also produced locally, and exported to all parts of the empire. The sauce was hugely popular condiment and was the ketchup or soy sauce of its day.

== Gallery ==
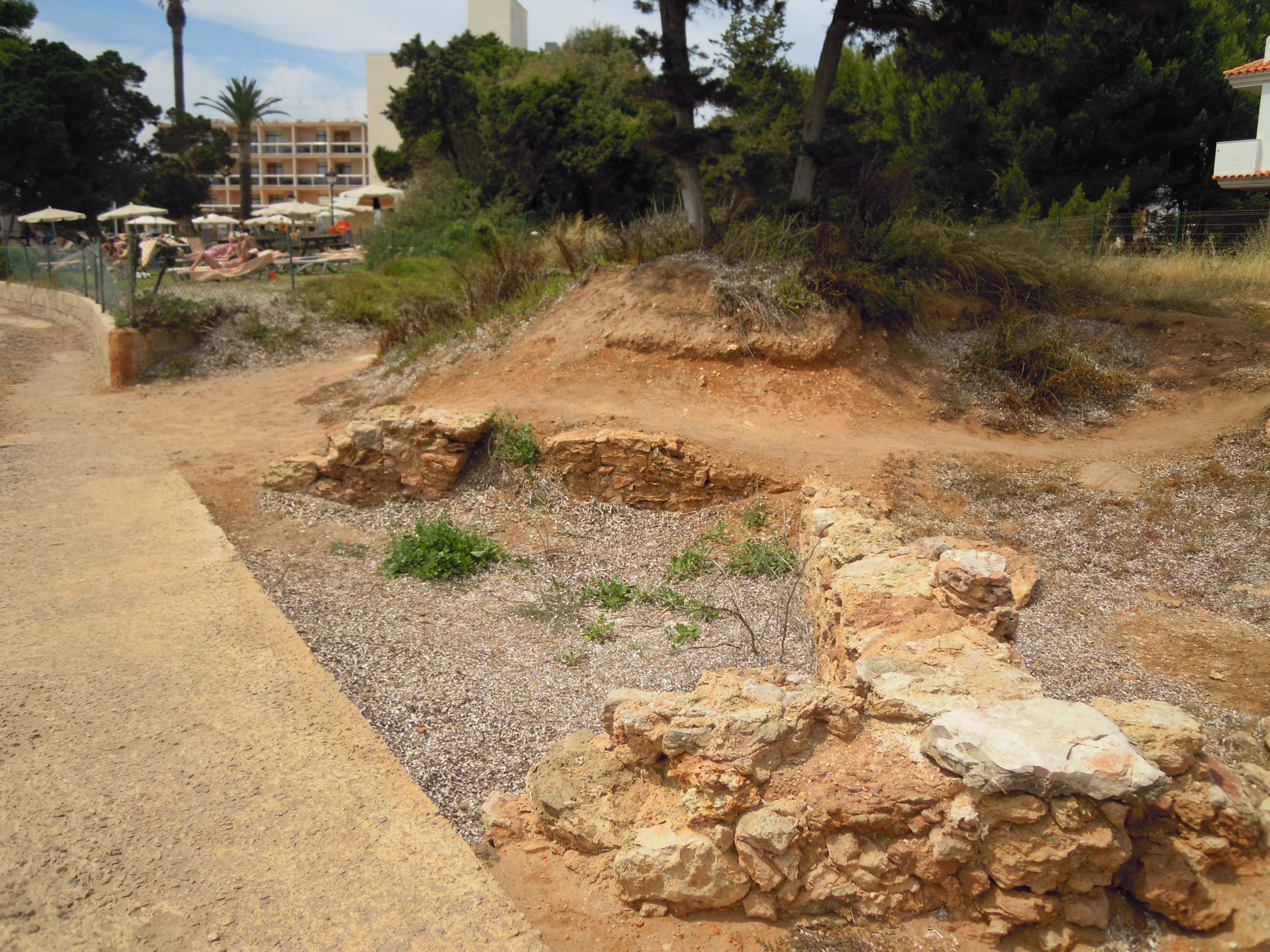
Remains of the holding ranks at the fish farm

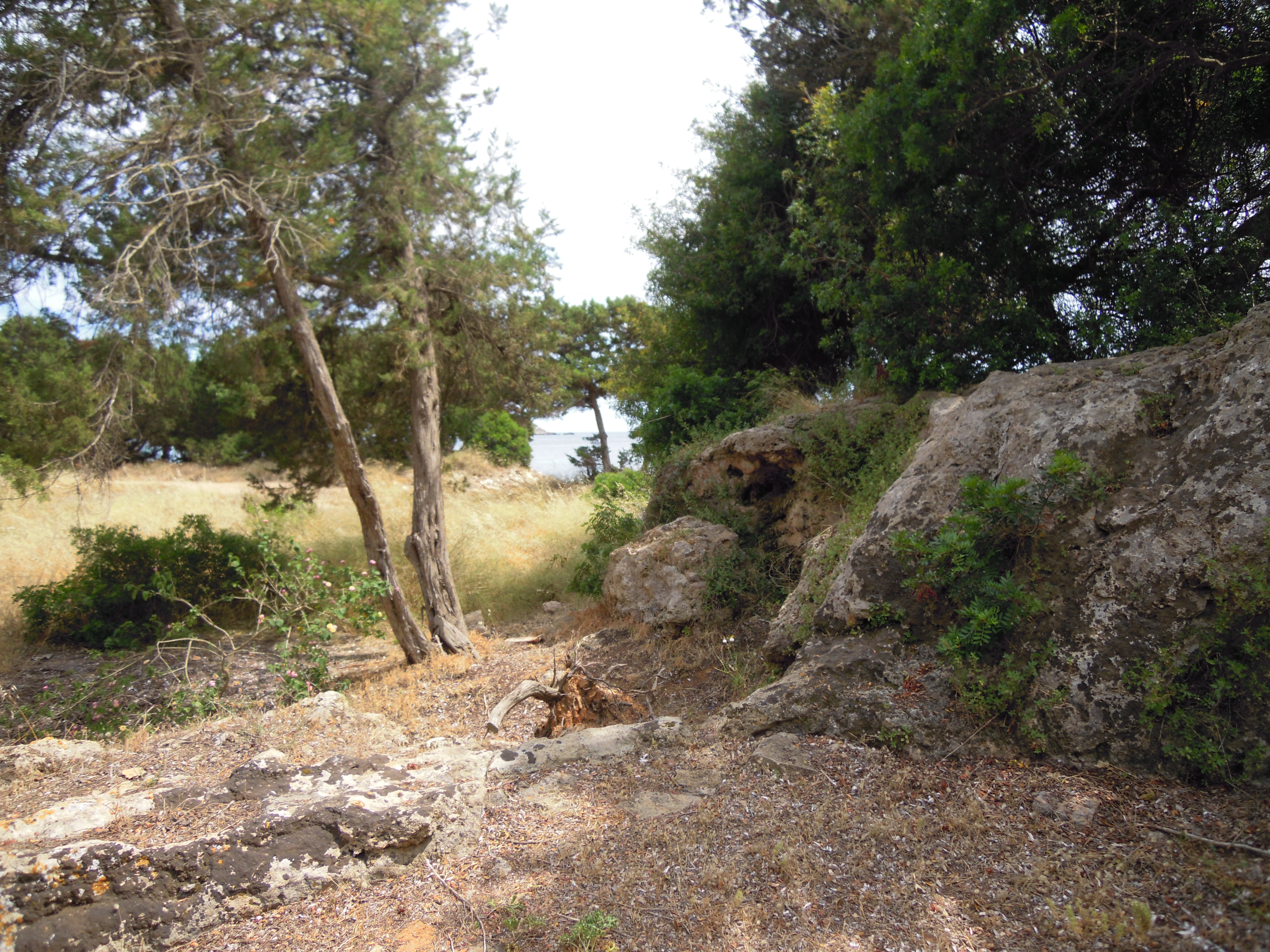
Southern end of the aqueduct

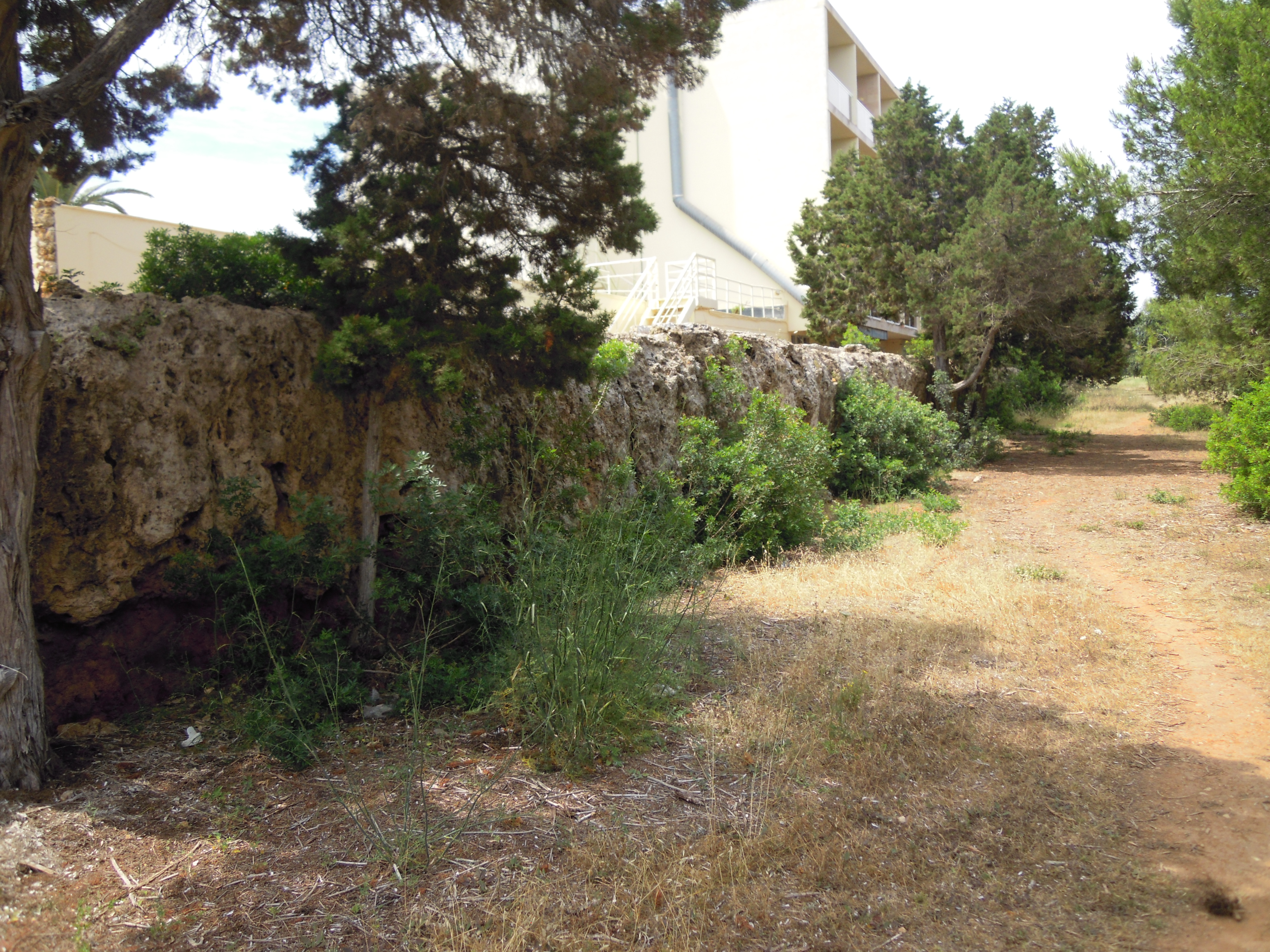
Roman remains of the aqueduct at S'Argamassa

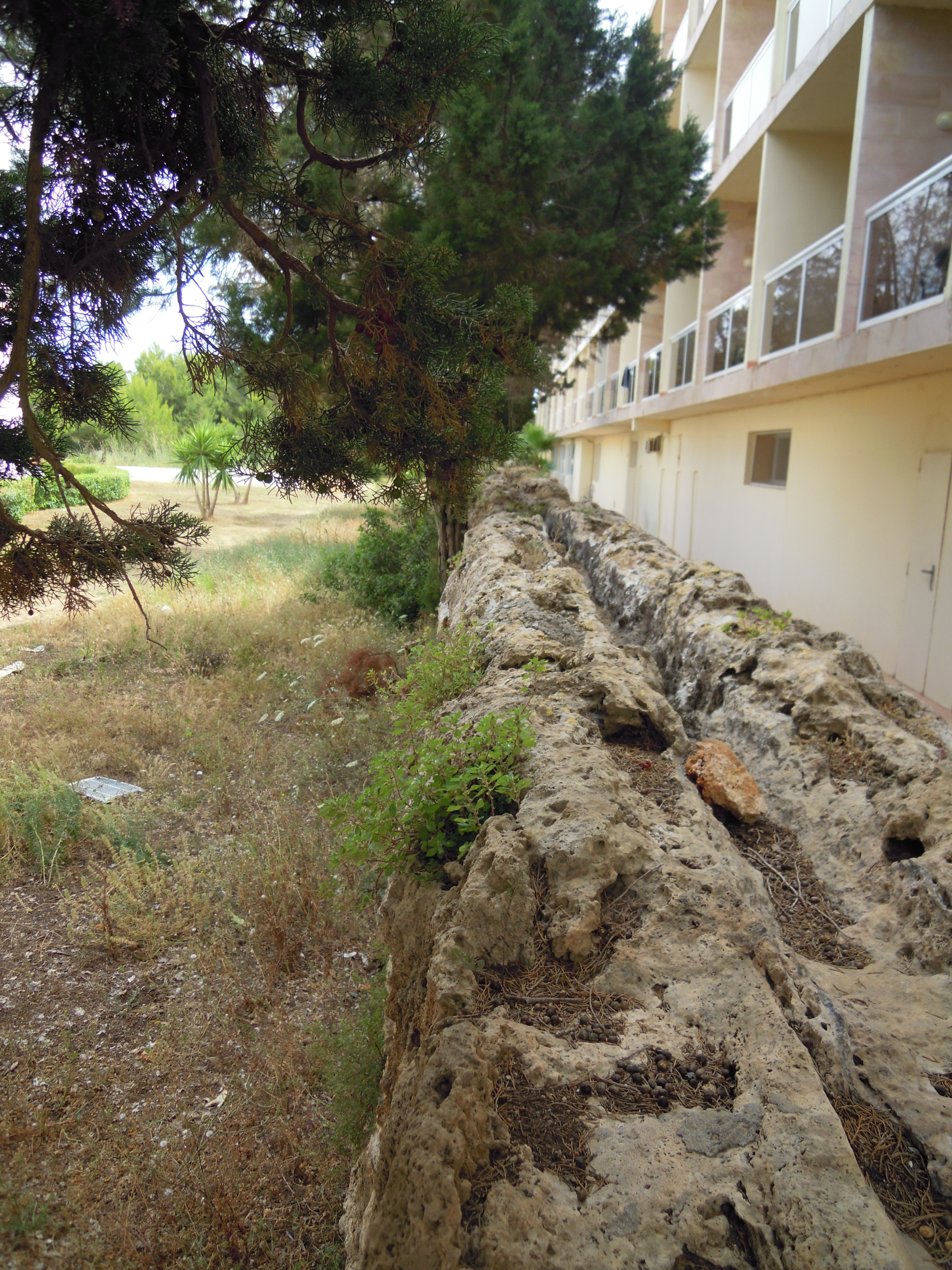
The water course can be clearly seen in the top surface of the aqueduct.
