= Pont Vell, Santa Eulària des Riu =

Bridge in Ibiza, Spain

Pont Vell
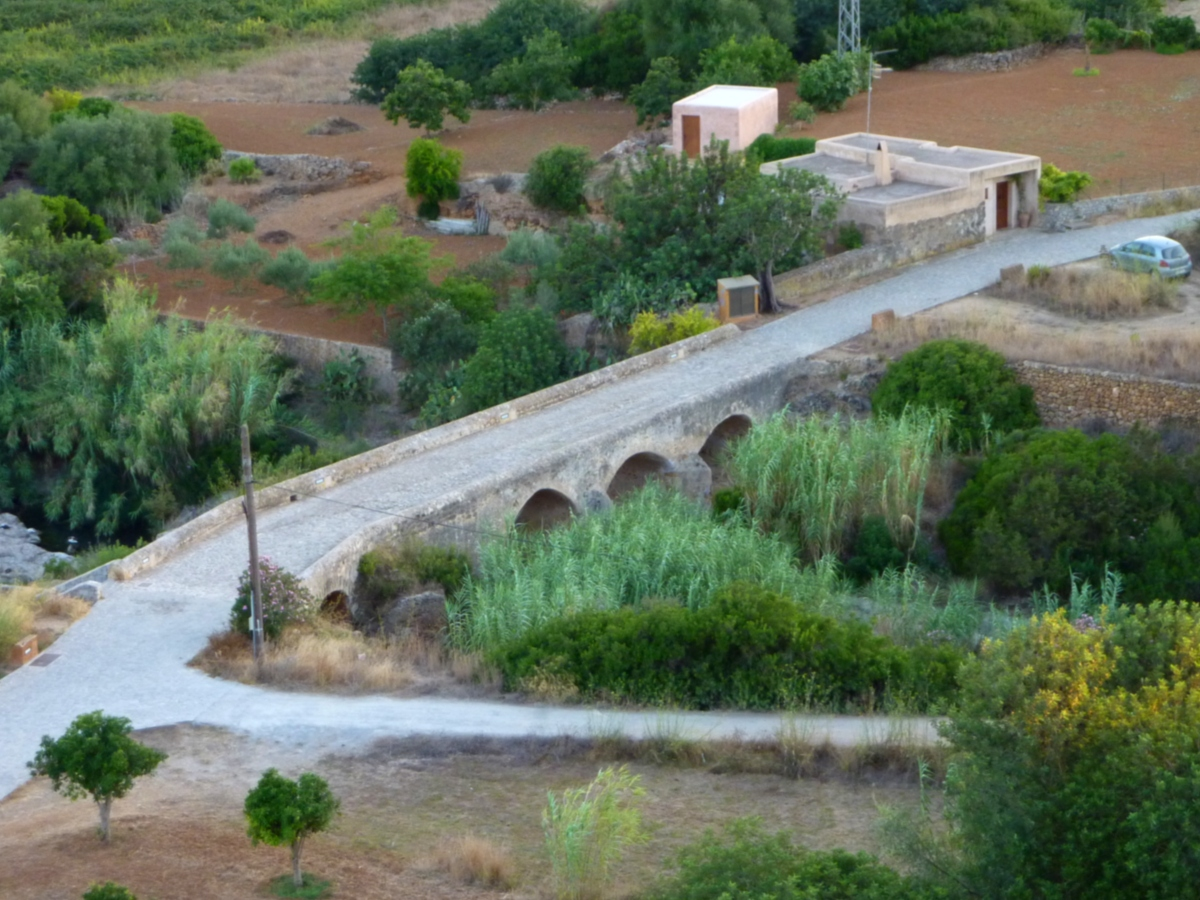
- Pont Vell
- Coordinates: 38.982748°N 1.527432°E
- Locale: Santa Eulària des Riu, Ibiza, Spain.
- Heritage status: Roman

Characteristics
- Material: Stone
- Total length: 87.5 metres (287 ft)
- Width: 4.75 metres (15.6 ft)
- Height: 8.75 metres (28.7 ft)

History
- Construction start: Roman Period
- Construction end: Unknown

Location
- Interactive map of Pont Vell

Pont Vell is the ancient bridge which crosses the Riu de Santa Eulària (Santa Eulària river), the only river on the Spanish island of Ibiza. The bridge stands next to the modern road bridge on the western approach to the town of Santa Eulària des Riu. Today the bridges is only used as a footbridge with all other traffic restricted to the adjacent modern bridge.

== History ==
Pont Vell was an important strategic crossing and was once the only way into Santa Eulària from the west. Its origins are considered to be Roman. The Rome Empire had made Ibiza a Federatae Civitae. The island was never conquered by the Romans and during a gradual period of Romanization the island saw an economic golden age which lasted from approximately 25 BC and 75 AD. It is thought that it was during this period the first bridge was built by the Romans to access the north east Canton of the island. The bridge that stands today is probably built on the foundations of the Roman bridge. It has been estimated that this bridge was probably built in the sixteenth or seventeenth century.

== The Legend of Els familiar ==
According to an ancient Ibizan legend there is a rather ugly bad tempered pixie that can be both good and bad. This pixie's appearance could only be conjured up by the picking and the instant bottling of a flowering herb which could only be found under the Pont Vell's arches. These herbs shelter the spirits of Fameliars. The pixies were said to have only two aims during their apparitions: to work or eat. If you had a particular task which required some hard work, capturing one of the pixies was a good way to complete your job. The drawback was that if the work stopped, the pixie would then spend all its time eating. The legend dictates that to capture the Familiar you must first go under the bridge at first light on the day of the festival of Saint Juan (June 24) and collect the flowers of the herb, making sure that you pick the herbs quickly, as they can appear and disappear at a glance. Placing the crop in the black bottle the vessel should then be closed tightly. The bottle could then be kept and opened when hard work was required to be done quickly and properly. Once liberated, the Familiar will cry: "Soc es familiar, vull veina o menjar", which means "I am a Familiar! I would like work or food!" . The drawback of the releasing of this spirit is that if you do not give the Familiar work to do, it will eat you out of house and home. Although this story is a subject of myth, an unfortunate man from Santa Eulària was sent to prison by the Holy Office in 1744. He had sworn under oath to owning a Familiar and that he knew of many people in the area who also had possession of the spirits.
