= Monsieur Ouine =

1943 novel by Georges Bernanos

- First English-language edition
- Author: Georges Bernanos
- Translator: Geoffrey Dunlop
- Language: French
- Publisher: Atlantica Editora
- Publication date: 1943
- Publication place: Brazil
- English publication date: 1945 (Bodley Head
- Pages: 314

Monsieur Ouine is a 1943 novel by the French writer Georges Bernanos. It tells the story of a retired teacher who settles in a village in northern France, where he becomes surrounded by mysterious deaths and other unexplained events. The book was published in English in 1945 as The Open Mind, translated by Geoffrey Dunlop. A new translation by William Bush was published in 2000 under the original French title.

== Composition ==
Monsieur Ouine has its origin in a spiritual crisis Bernanos went through in the early 1930s, when he contemplated how nihilism and despair lead to evil. The book took nine years to write and the author considered it to be his most ambitious work. The plot is purposely ambiguous and in certain parts inconsistent, as Bernanos considered evil to be unstable and wanted the novel to reflect this.

== Reception ==
Kirkus Reviews wrote in 2000: "This is a savage morality tale that depicts the dying of the landed aristocracy and a wartorn civilization's larger 'innocence' with sharp imagery, precise characterizations, and commanding intensity. All of Bernanos's fiction ought to be available in English translation, and William Bush looks like the right man for the job."
