= Georges Bernanos =

French writer (1888–1948)

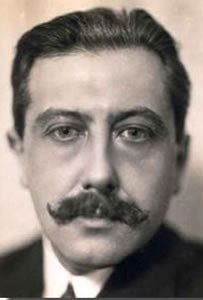
- Born: Louis Émile Clément Georges Bernanos; 20 February 1888; Paris, France
- Died: 5 July 1948 (aged 60); Neuilly-sur-Seine, France
- Occupation: Writer
- Children: 4, including Michel Bernanos
- Writing career
- Period: 20th century
- Genre: Novel
- Notable works: Under the Sun of Satan, The Diary of a Country Priest

Louis Émile Clément Georges Bernanos (French: [ʒɔʁʒ bɛʁnanɔs]; 20 February 1888 – 5 July 1948) was a French author, and a soldier in World War I. A Catholic with monarchist leanings, he was critical of elitist thought and was opposed to what he identified as defeatism. He believed this had led to France's defeat and eventual occupation by Germany in 1940 during World War II. His two best-known novels Sous le soleil de Satan (1926) and the Journal d'un curé de campagne (1936) both revolve around a parish priest who combats evil and despair in the world. Most of his novels have been translated into English and frequently published in both Great Britain and the United States.

== Life and career ==
Bernanos was born in Paris, into a family of craftsmen. He spent much of his childhood in the village of Fressin, Pas-de-Calais region, which became a frequent setting for his novels. He served in the First World War as a soldier, where he fought in the battles of the Somme and Verdun. He was wounded several times.

After the war, he worked in insurance before writing Sous le soleil de Satan (1926, Under the Sun of Satan). He won the Grand Prix du roman de l'Académie française for The Diary of a Country Priest (Journal d'un curé de campagne), published in 1936.

A man of Royalist leanings and a member of the Camelots du Roi (Action Française's youth organization) when he was younger, Bernanos broke with Charles Maurras and the Action Française in 1932. He initially supported Franco's coup at the outset of the Spanish Civil War. However, after he observed the conflict in Mallorca and saw 'a terrorized people,' he became disgusted with the nacionales and criticized them in the book Diary of My Times (1938). He wrote, "My illusions regarding the enterprise of General Franco did not last long—two or three weeks—but while they lasted I conscientiously endeavoured to overcome the disgust which some of his men and means caused me."

With political tensions rising in Europe, Bernanos emigrated to South America with his family in 1938, settling in Brazil. He remained until 1945 in Barbacena, State of Minas Gerais, where he tried his hand at managing a farm. His three sons returned to France to fight after World War II broke out, while he fulminated at his country's 'spiritual exhaustion,' which he saw as the root of its collapse in 1940. From exile, he mocked the 'ridiculous' Vichy regime and became a strong supporter of the Free French led by Charles De Gaulle. After France's Liberation, De Gaulle invited Bernanos to return to his homeland, offering him a post in the government. Bernanos did return but, disappointed to perceive no signs of spiritual renewal, he declined to play an active role in French political life.

== Works and English translations ==
- Sous le soleil de Satan 1926.
  - The Star of Satan. London: The Bodley Head, 1927 [New York: Macmillan, 1940; H. Fertig, 1975].
  - Under the Sun of Satan. New York: Pantheon, 1949 [University of Nebraska Press, 2001].
  - Under the Sun of Satan. Providence, RI: Cluny Media, 2017.
- Les Ténèbres (diptyque): L'Imposture (1927) & La Joie (1928)
  - Joy. New York: Pantheon Books, 1946 [London: The Bodley Head, 1948; Toronto: Thomas Nelson, 1948].
  - The Impostor. Lincoln: University of Nebraska Press, 1999.
  - Joy. Providence, RI: Cluny Media, 2020.
- Un crime 1935.
  - The Crime. London: Hale, 1936 [New York: E.P. Dutton, 1936].
  - A Crime. Providence, RI: Cluny Media, 2021.
- Journal d'un curé de campagne 1936 (also issued serially 1935–36)
  - The Diary of a Country Priest 1936 in Paris, France; London: The Bodley Head, 1937 [New York: Macmillan, 1948, 1962; Carroll & Graf, 1983, 2002]; San Francisco: Ignatius Press, 2025 [new translation by Bernanos scholar Michael R. Tobin, the full, unabridged work is made available to English-language readers for the first time].
- Nouvelle histoire de Mouchette 1937
  - Mouchette. London: The Bodley Head, 1966 [New York: Holt, Rinehart & Winston, 1966; New York Review Books, 2006].
- Les grands cimetières sous la lune 1938
  - A Diary of My Times. New York: Macmillan, 1938 [London: The Bodley Head, 1945].
  - The Great Cemeteries under the Moon. Providence, RI: Cluny Media, 2018.
- Monsieur Ouine 1943
  - The Open Mind. London: The Bodley Head, 1945.
  - Monsieur Ouine. Lincoln: University of Nebraska Press, 2000.
- Dialogues des carmélites 1949.
  - The Fearless Heart. Toronto: Thomas Nelson, 1952 [London: The Bodley Head, 1952].
- Un mauvais rêve (posthumously 1950)
  - Night Is Darkest. London: The Bodley Head, 1953.
  - A Bad Dream. Providence, RI: Cluny Media, 2020.
- Plea for Liberty. New York: Pantheon, 1944 [London: Dobson, 1946].
- Sanctity Will Out. London and New York: Sheed & Ward, 1947.
- Tradition of Freedom. London: Dobson, 1950 [New York: Roy, 1951].
- The Last Essays of Georges Bernanos. Chicago: Henry Regnery Co., 1955 [Conn.: Greenwood Press, 1968].
  - Liberty: The Last Essays. Providence, RI: Cluny Media, 2019.

== Adaptations of selected works ==
- The Diary of a Country Priest: this was the first novel by Bernanos to be adapted as a film, called Diary of a Country Priest (1951); it was directed by Robert Bresson, and starred Claude Laydu in his debut role.
- Mouchette was adapted into a film of the same name by Robert Bresson, released in 1967.
- Under the Sun of Satan: his novel was adapted as a film of the same name, produced in 1987 in France. The film won the Palme d'Or prize at the 1987 Cannes Film Festival.
- Dialogues des Carmélites: in 1947, Bernanos had been hired to write the dialogue for a film screenplay, through Raymond-Léopold Bruckberger and the scenario writer Philippe Agostini, based on the novella The Song at the Scaffold by the German writer Gertrud von Le Fort, about the 1794 execution of the Carmelite Nuns of Compiègne. The screenplay was judged unsatisfactory at the time. Following Bernanos' death his literary executor, Albert Béguin, discovered the manuscript. To assist Bernanos' heirs, Béguin sought to have the work published, requesting permission from Baroness von Le Fort for publication. In January 1949 she agreed, gifting her portion of the royalties over to Bernanos' widow and children. However, the Baroness requested that Bernanos' play be given a different title from her novella. Béguin chose Dialogues des Carmélites, and the work was published in 1949. It was translated into German, published there in 1951 as Die begnadete Angst (The Blessed Fear) and first staged in Zürich and Munich that year. The French stage première took place in May 1952 at the Théâtre Hébertot. The composer Francis Poulenc adapted Bernanos' work into an opera of the same name, which was first performed at La Scala Milan in 1957. A film based on Bernanos' play and starring Jeanne Moreau was released in 1960.
