= Illa de Tagomago =

Private island near Ibiza, Spain

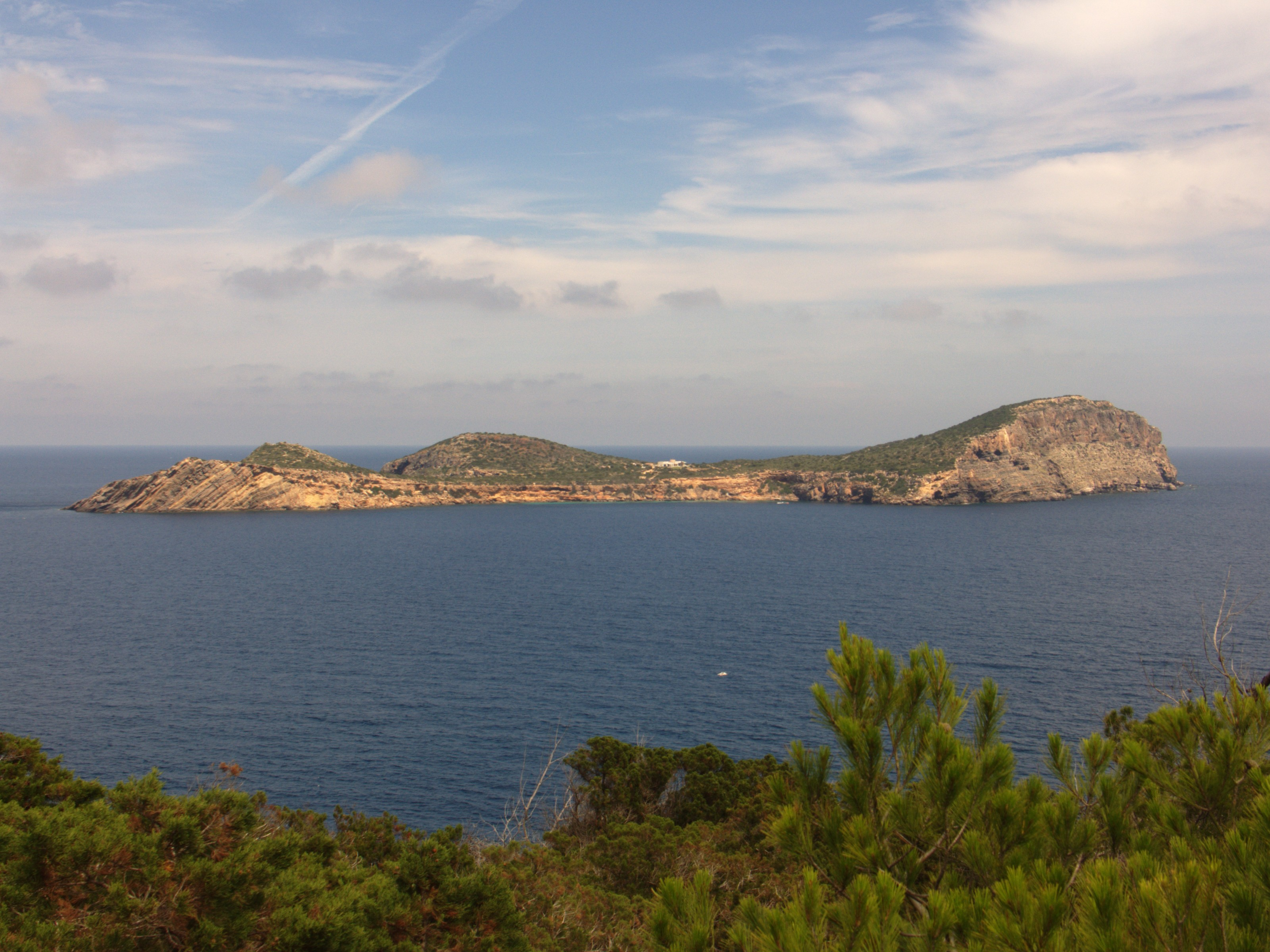
- The island of Tagomago

- Location within Balearic Islands

Geography
- Location: Balearic Sea
- Coordinates: 39°02′00″N 1°39′00″E
- Archipelago: Balearic Archipelago

Administration
- Spain
- Autonomous Community: Balearic Islands
- Province: Ibiza
- Municipality: Santa Eulària des Riu

Illa de Tagomago is a private island off the east coast of Ibiza belonging to Spain.

The etymology is likely from tagomago meaning "rock Mago" in reference to Mago Barca, a brother of the Carthaginian general Hannibal. In the Muslim era it was known as Taj Umayu.

It is 1,525 m long and 113 m wide. The island is rocky, with a port and a lighthouse in the extreme southeast. The Tagomago lighthouse was built in 1913 and is a landmark in the shipping routes from Ibiza to Palma de Mallorca and Barcelona. It is 86.3 m above sea level, and its height is 20.4 m.

The island is privately owned by a Spanish family, and has a small tourist facility that politicians and celebrities frequently visit.
