= Santa Eulària des Riu =

Santa Eulària des Riu Santa Eulalia del Río (Spanish)
- Town
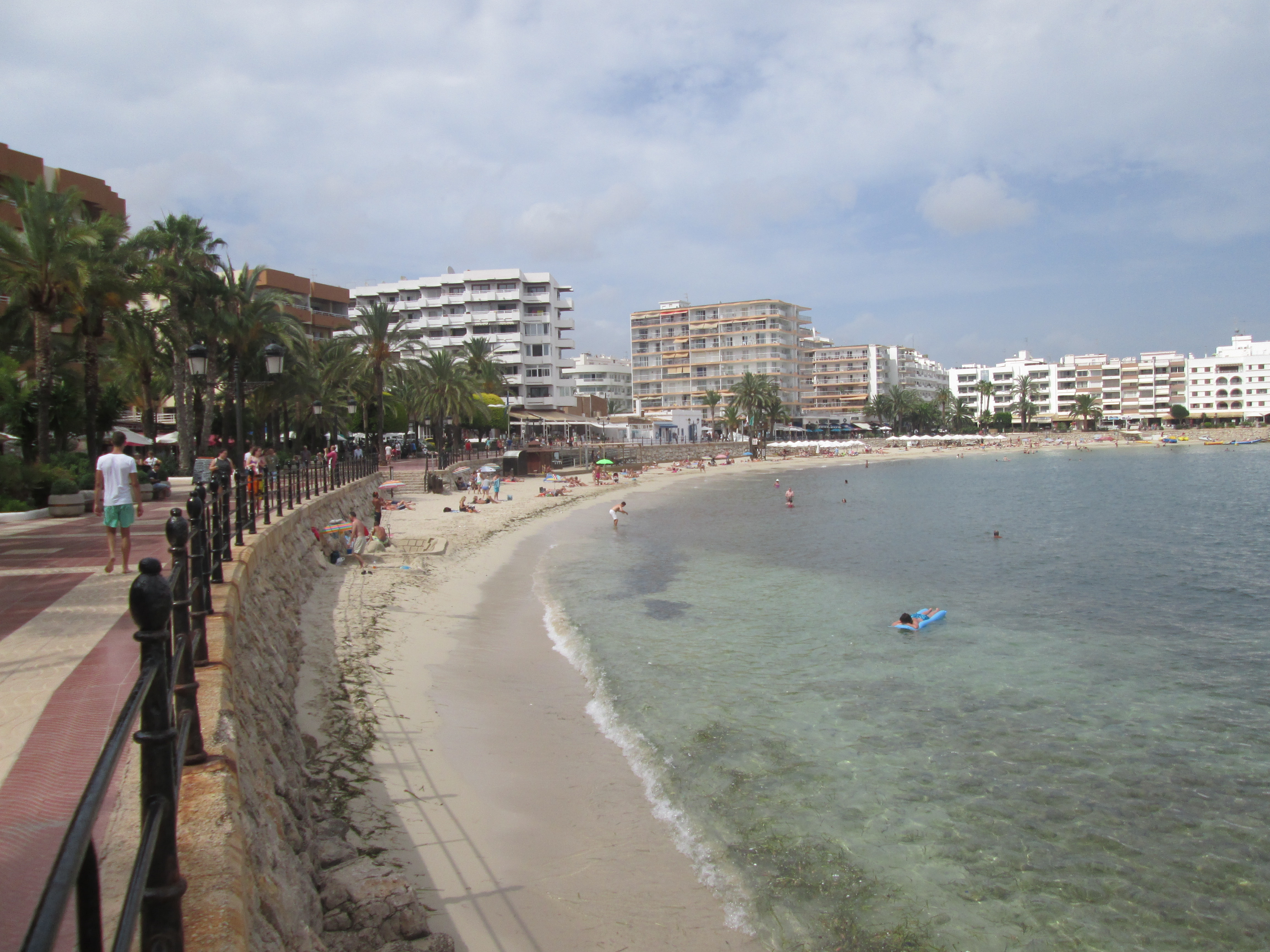
- The beach of Santa Eulària des Riu in 2014

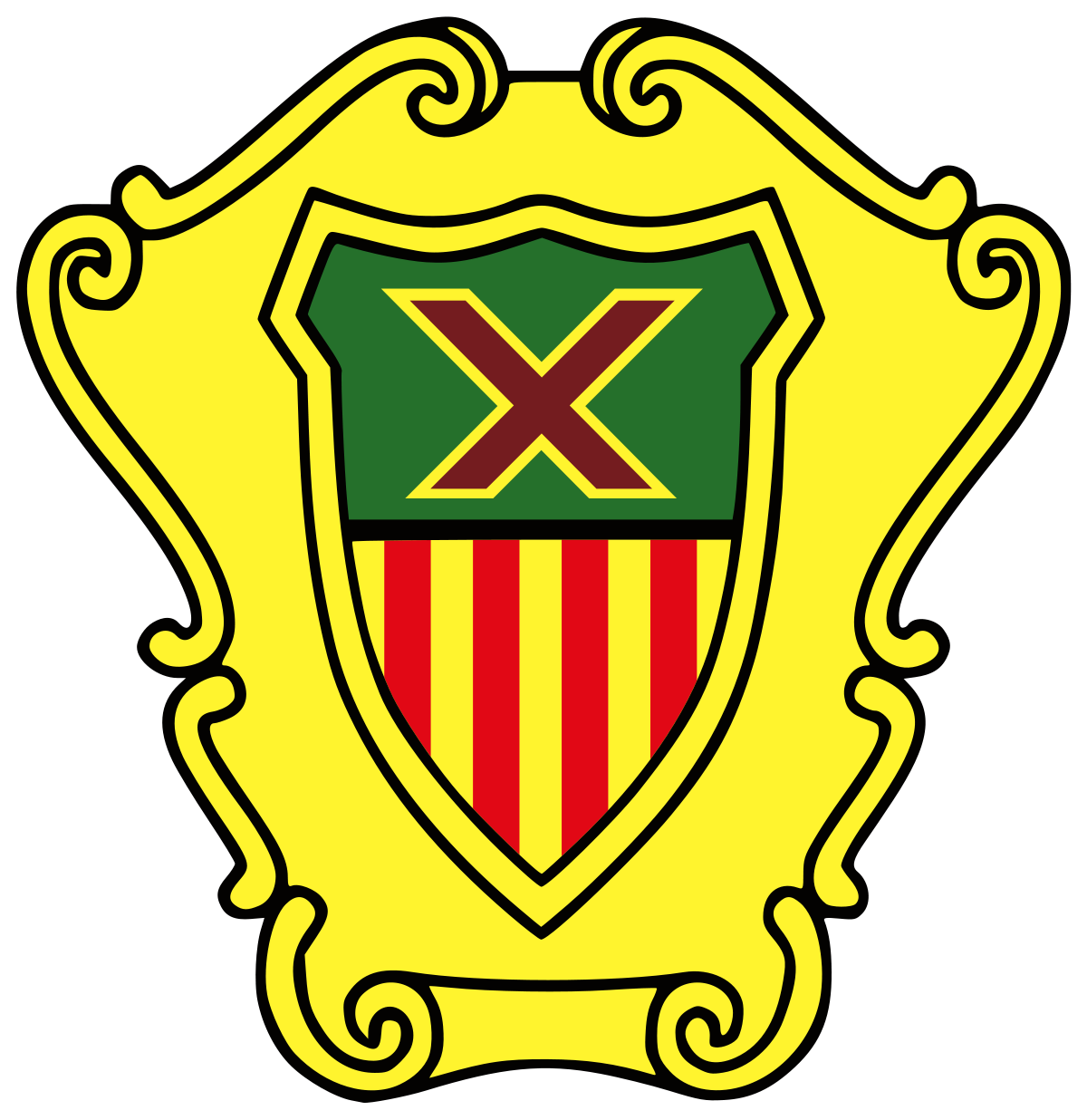
- Coat of arms

- Location of the municipality

- Location of the Town of Santa Eulària des Riu
- Coordinates: 38°59′5″N 1°32′0.1″E
- Country: Spain
- Autonomous community: Balearic Islands
- Province: Balearic Islands
- Island: Ibiza

Government
  - Mayor: Carmen Ferrer Torres (PP)

Area
  - Total: 153.48 km^{2} (59.26 sq mi)
- Elevation: 52 m (171 ft)

Population (2025)
  - Total: 21,606
  - Density: 140.77/km^{2} (364.60/sq mi)
- Demonym(s): Eularienc, eularienca (Catalan)
- Time zone: UTC+1 (CET)
  - Summer (DST): UTC+2 (CEST)
- Official languages: Catalan(Eivissenc) and Spanish
- Website: Official Website

Santa Eulària des Riu (Catalan pronunciation: [ˈsantə əwˈlaɾiə ðəz ˈriw], Spanish: Santa Eulalia del Río) is a coastal town on the south eastern coast of the Spanish island of Ibiza. The town is located on the designated road EI-200. Santa Eulària is the third largest town on the island and also has the only river on the island which flows into the sea at the western end of the town.

== Location ==
The town is 9.3 miles (15.0 km) northeast of Ibiza Town and 13.6 miles (21.9 km) of Ibiza Airport. The town sits next to a wide bay with the promontory of Punta Arabí at the east end of the Bay. Also at the eastern end of the bay is new marina called Port Esportiu which is full of restaurants, shops and bars. The town has two beaches which are kept clean and tidy and have gently sloping sands and are ideal for young families. At the western end of the bay is the prominent hill of 'Puig d’ en Fita', which dominates the landscape. The hill is dotted with apartments, hotels and private houses, and at night is dotted with the dwellings lights.

== Town proper ==
At the centre of the town on the ‘Plaça d’Espanya’ is the Ajuntament (town hall) which is now one of the last historical buildings of the town. The present building, which has been renovated, dates from 1795 and reflects the typical architecture of the period on the island. Nowadays the building is less functional as a town hall and is used with a civic representative purpose. In front of the Ajuntament is a small square which has a fountain with a stone surround which faces the busy main street of 'Carrer Saint Jaume'. Behind the fountain is a stone monument, erected by the city of Palma de Mallorca, Mallorca to thank and honour the local fishermen who, on 17 January 1913, rescued victims of the shipwrecked steamboat 'Mallorca' which had run aground on a reef near the rocky inlet of Redona at Punta Arabí. The town streets run grid like from the 'Plaça d’Espanya' with the 'Carrer Saint Jaume' running west to east. The 'Carrer da Sant Vincent' runs parallel, one street back from ‘Carrer Saint Jaume’ with the western end of ‘Plaça d’Espanya’. This street is pedestrianized and is filled with tavernas and restaurants. The 'Passeig de s'Alamera' is an attractive thoroughfare which runs south from the 'Plaça d'Espanya' down to the seafront. This boulevard has a tree lined central pedestrianized area with gardens. In the summer this shady "Ramblas" is lined with market stalls selling jewellery, sarongs, tie-dye Thai garb and trinkets of all kinds. At the southern end of 'Passeig de s’Alamera' is Santa Eulalia's harbour front with views of the bay.

== The River ==
The river is called Riu de Santa Eulalia, it is more of a small stream and only ever becomes a raging torrent following very heavy rainfall. The source of the river is below the 342-metre-high Puig d’en Sopes close to Sant Miquel. The river then meanders for 17 kilometres (11 mi) through the countryside to the sea at the western end of the town. A small way inland from the mouth of the river there is a small triple arched bridge, the Pont Vell, the bridge crosses the rocky valley and is claimed to have been built by the Romans as part of the imperial road building schemes on the island between 200 BC and AD 400, although the bridge's earliest mention is in a document of 1720. The river is also the only one of its kind in the Balearic Islands, and is fed by several small tributaries, notably the Torrent de Labritja, which originates at the northern village of Sant Joan de Labritja.

== The Parish Church of Santa Eulària ==
To the west of the town centre is the hill called ‘Puig de Missa’. The hill is 52 metres above sea level and its summit is dominated by the Església de Puig de Missa. The church is dedicated to Saint Eulalia. The Path to the church spirals up around the hillside before arriving in a courtyard beside the church come Fortress. The Church is thought to have been built in 1568, although it is recorded that there was a chapel dedicated to the saint as far back as 1302. Despite the huge natural advantage of constructing the church on this hilltop, the small community of Santa Eulària, employed the skills of military designer Giovanni Calvi to fortify the church you see here today. Calvi had a rounded bastion constructed in the style of the islands many watchtower although the church's bastion is solid and has no internal guardrooms. The church's nave roof is higher than the Bastion which restricted the range and scope of any cannon placed on the bastion, although it is thought that at one time the roof may have been lower than the bastion. The Porch of the church, added in the eighteenth century, is larger than most on the island and stands separate from the main church building. It has multiple pillars and rounded arches which has been compared to the Moorish style of architecture, and this does compare well with a mosque and its prayer halls still seen on main land Spain. The porch is probably the newest part of this church.

On the west elevation of the church there is a small chapel which is topped with a plain stone dome complete with a lantern. This chapel is an addition to the original church, and is entered through a ponderous arch bored through the massively thick walls. The interior is square and rather small with the dome above supported on squat arches over each corner. The lantern above has stained glass lights. There is another similar chapel on the opposite wall which gives the nave a footprint in the shape of the crucifix. There is a gilded altarpiece which was brought and installed from Segovia in 1967. The rest of the church is sparse and has been heavily restored due to the extreme damage done to the church during the Spanish Civil War.

== Popular culture ==
The town was depicted, in the time before and up to the outbreak of the Spanish Civil War, in Elliot Paul's Life and Death of a Spanish Town (1937).

== Notable people ==
- Rigoberto Soler, Impressionist painter; lived in the town from 1924 to 1956.
- Elliot Paul (10 February 1891 – 7 April 1958), was an American journalist and author who lived in the town for six years.
- Wilhelm Keitel, Field Marshal of Nazi Germany owned a house in the town which remained empty until 1958
- Denholm Elliott, British actor
- Terry-Thomas, British actor
- Robin Maugham, British novelist, playwright and travel writer.
- Dame Diana Rigg, British actress
- Leslie Phillips, English actor
- Laurence Olivier, English actor
- Nigel Davenport, English actor
- Laureano Barrau, impressionist painter lived and died in the town

== Gallery ==
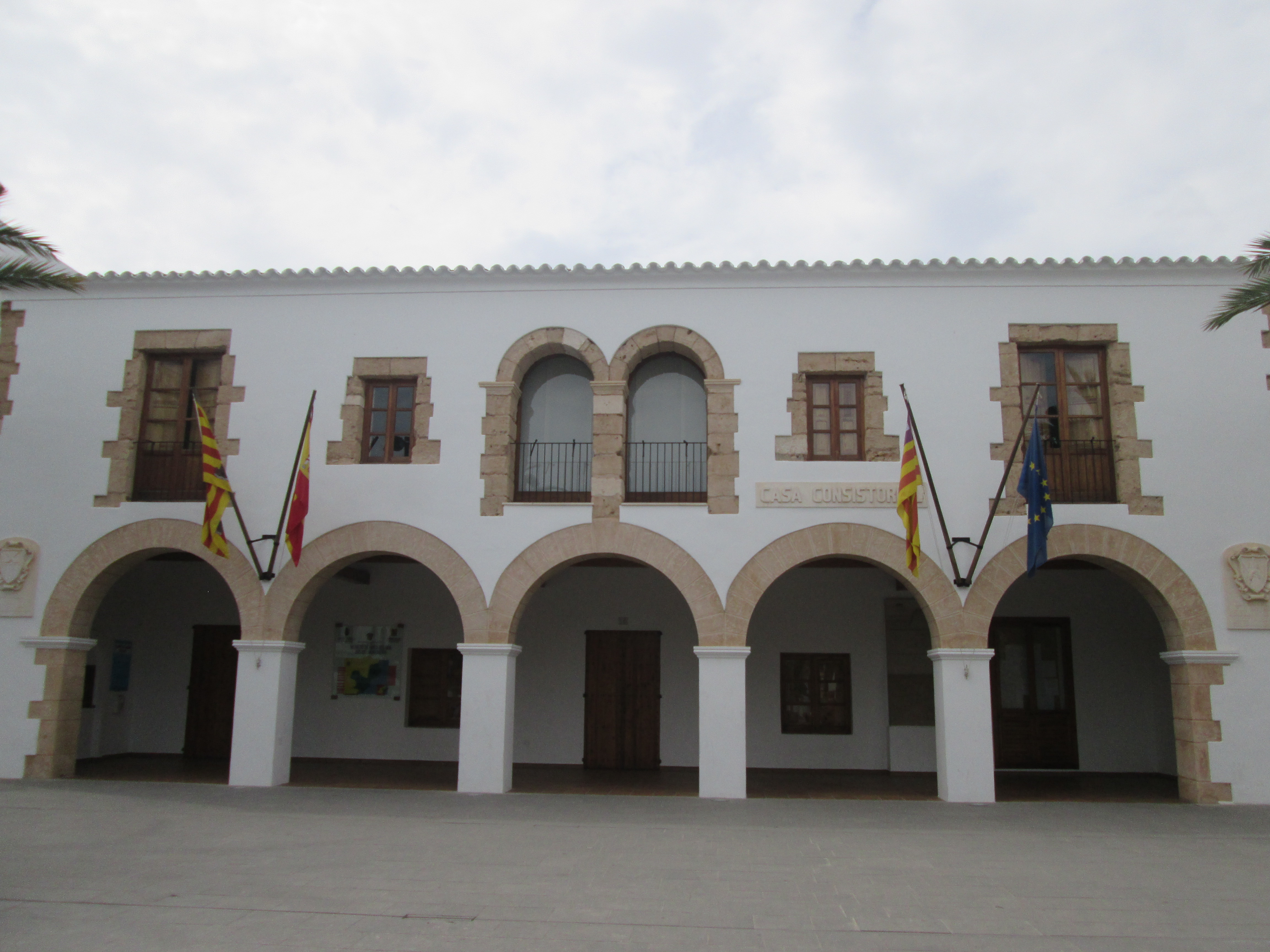
The Ajuntament (Town Hall)

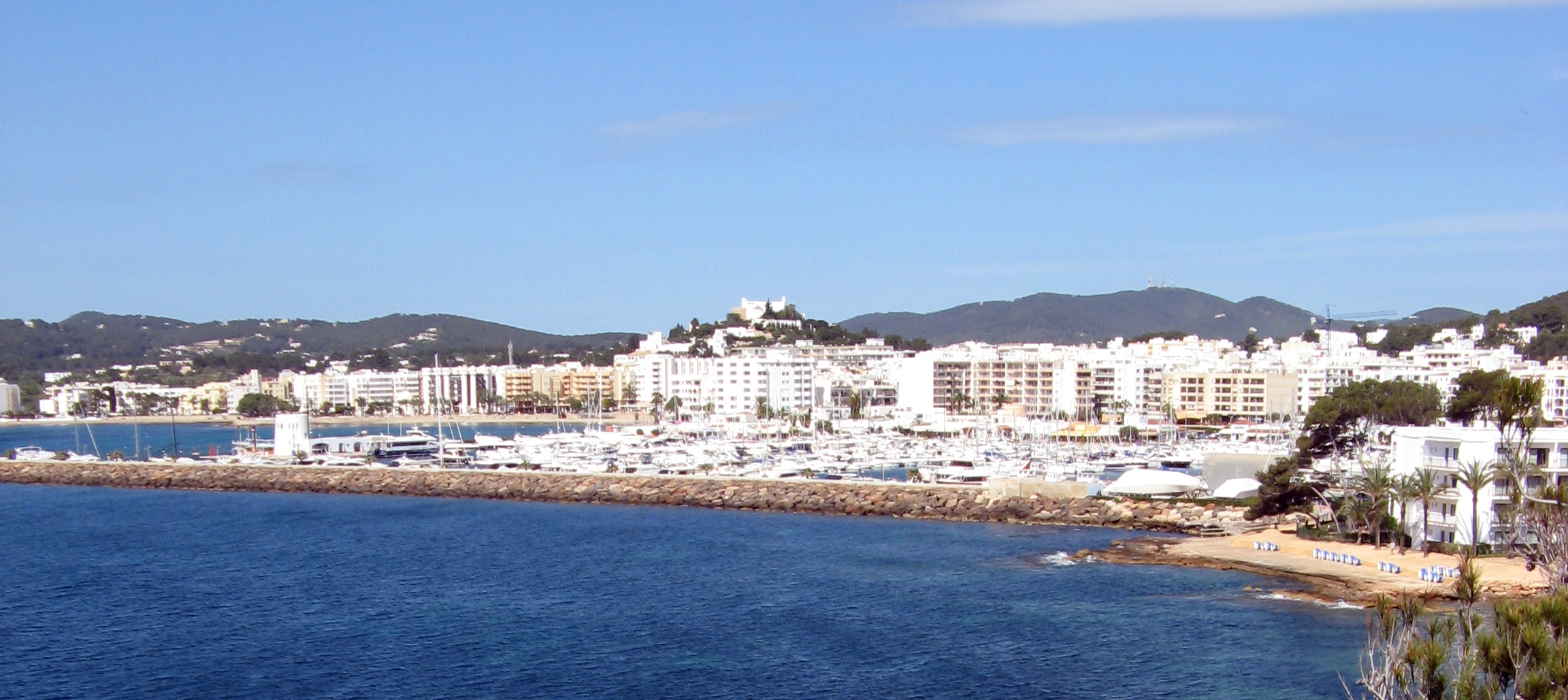
Port and town of Santa Eulària des Riu from NE.

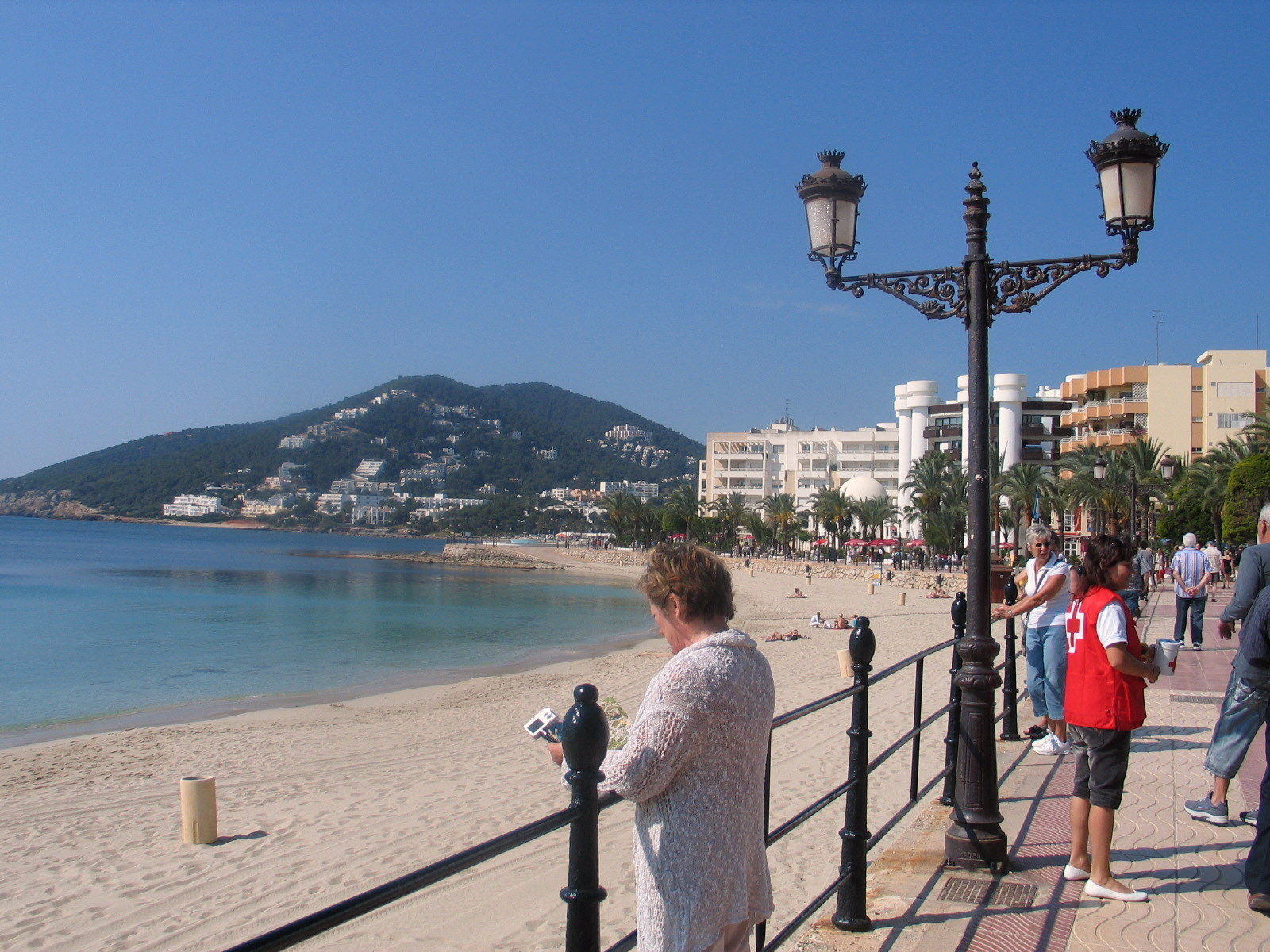
Seafront and beach with the hill 'Puig d’ en Fita' in the background.

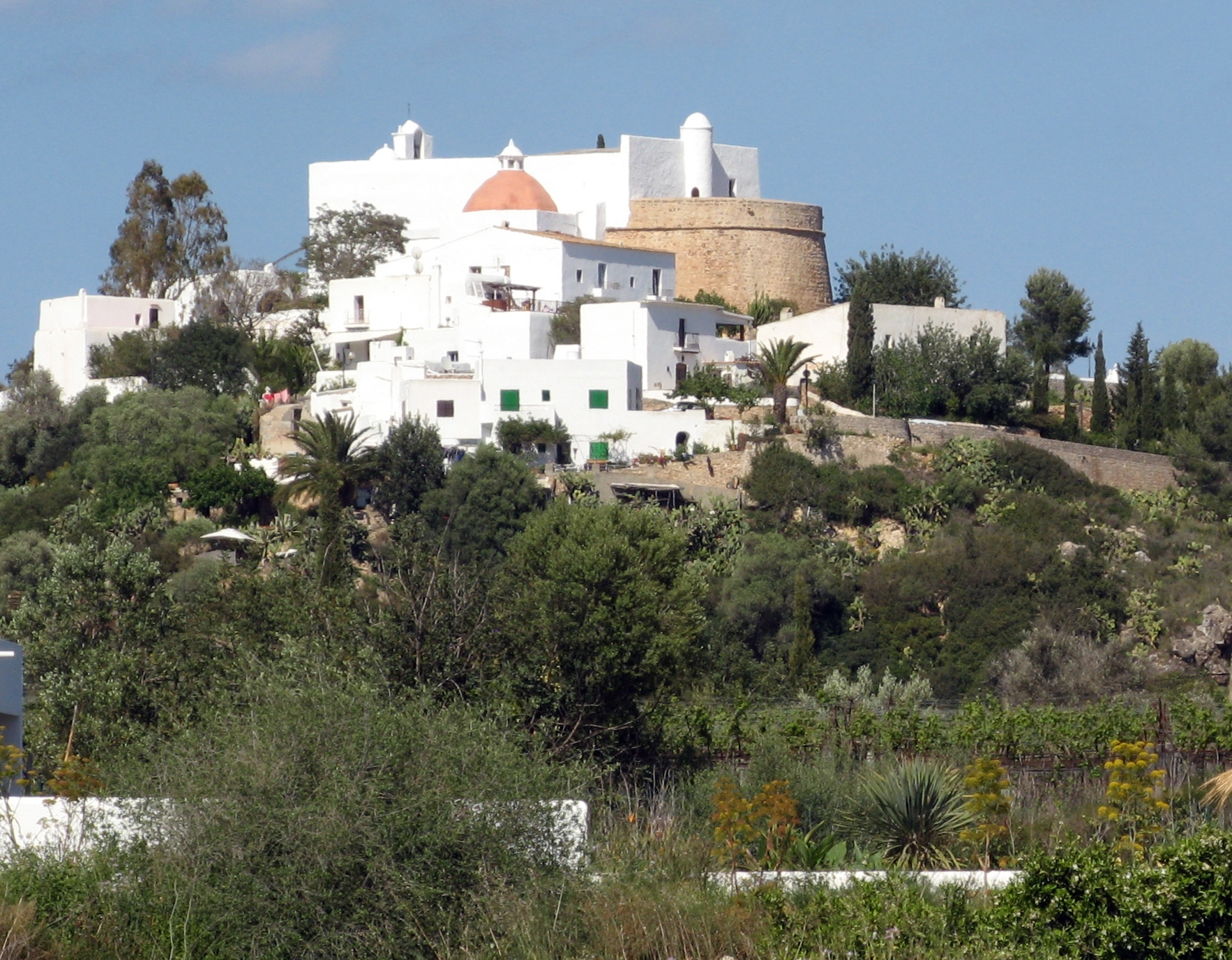
Puig de Missa, a former mosque, now a church on a hill above the town.

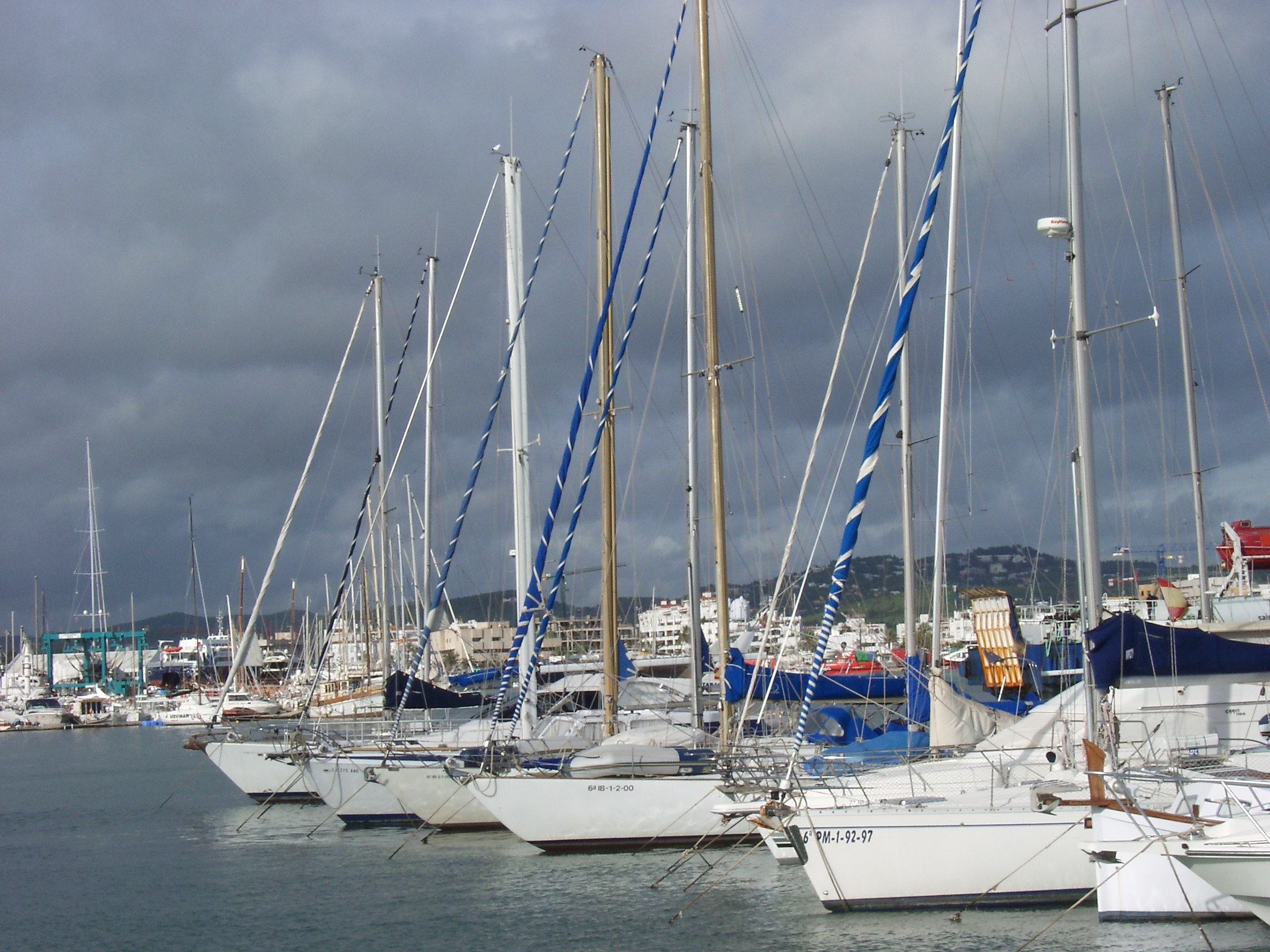
Marina of Santa Eulària des Riu.

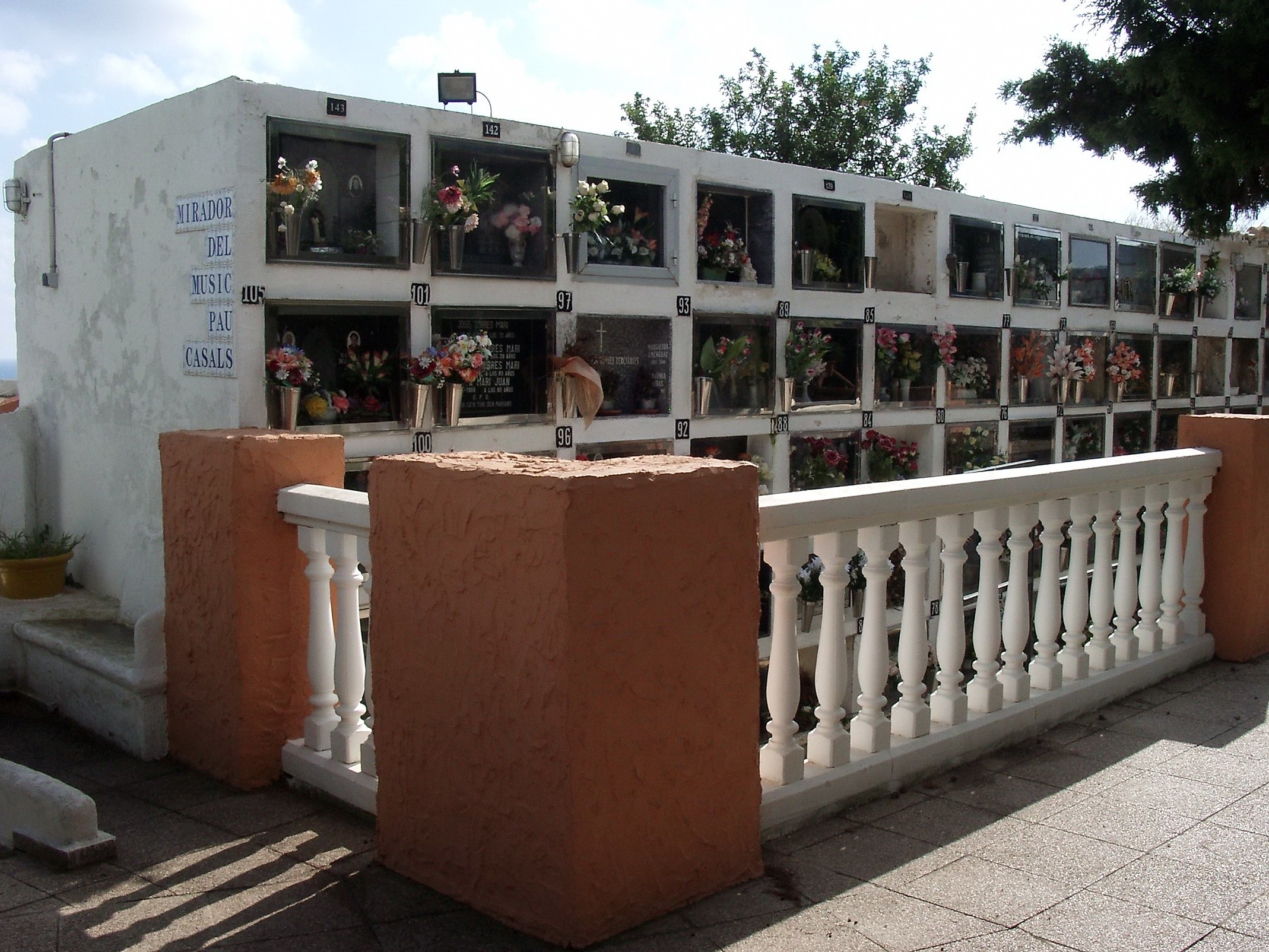
Cemetery.

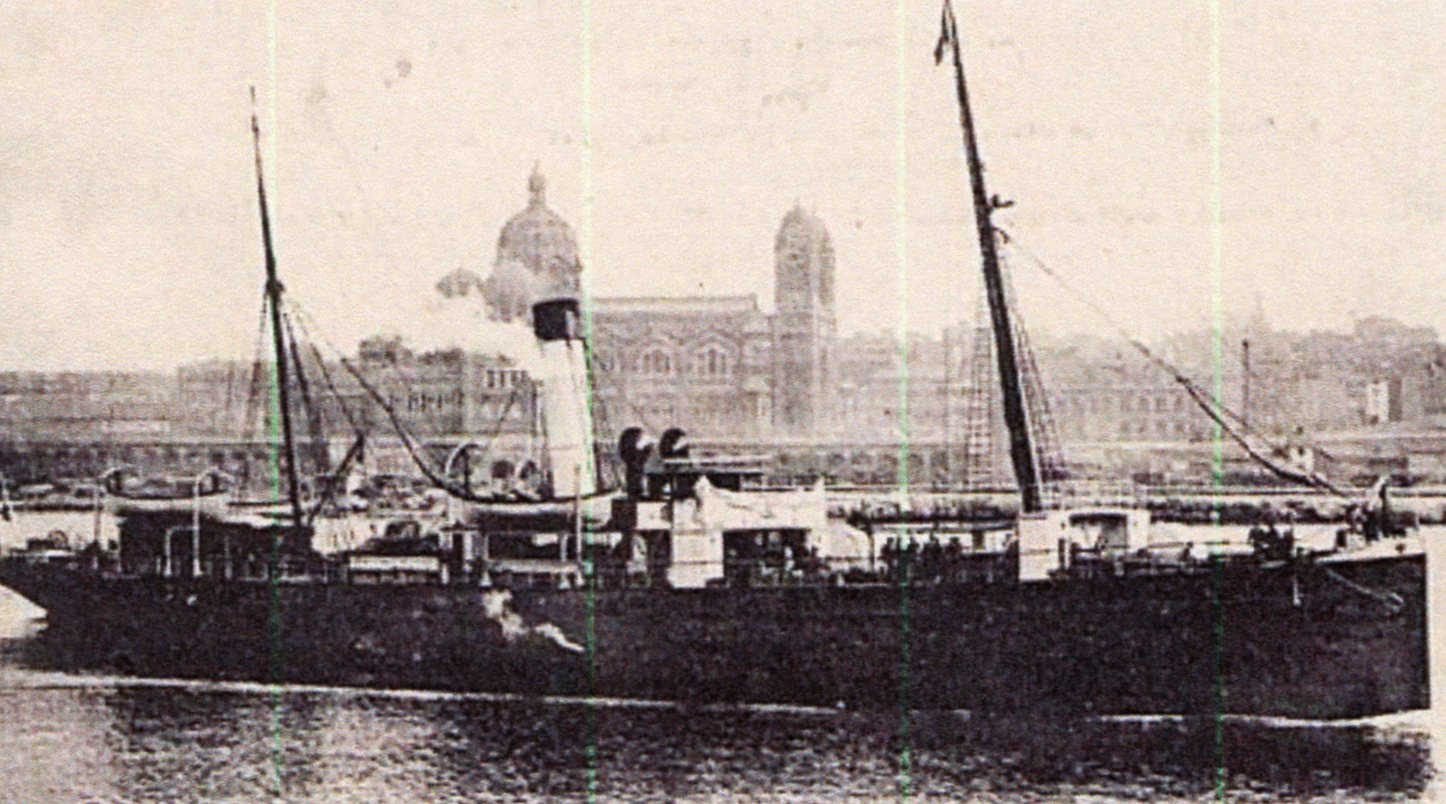
The SS Mallorca which sank on the 17th January 1913 after running aground on a reef around Illa Redona

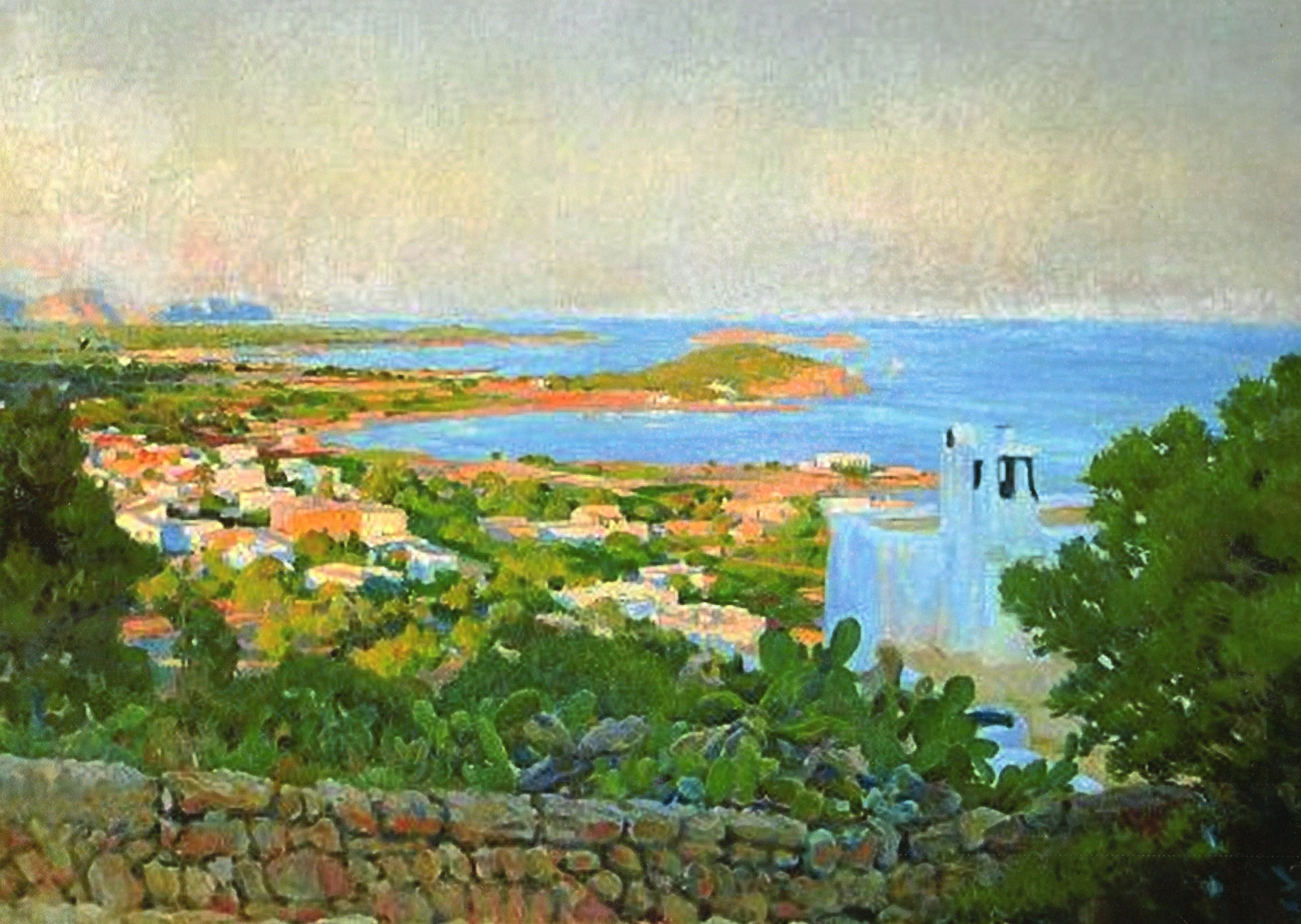
View of Santa Eulària (1943) by Rigoberto Soler

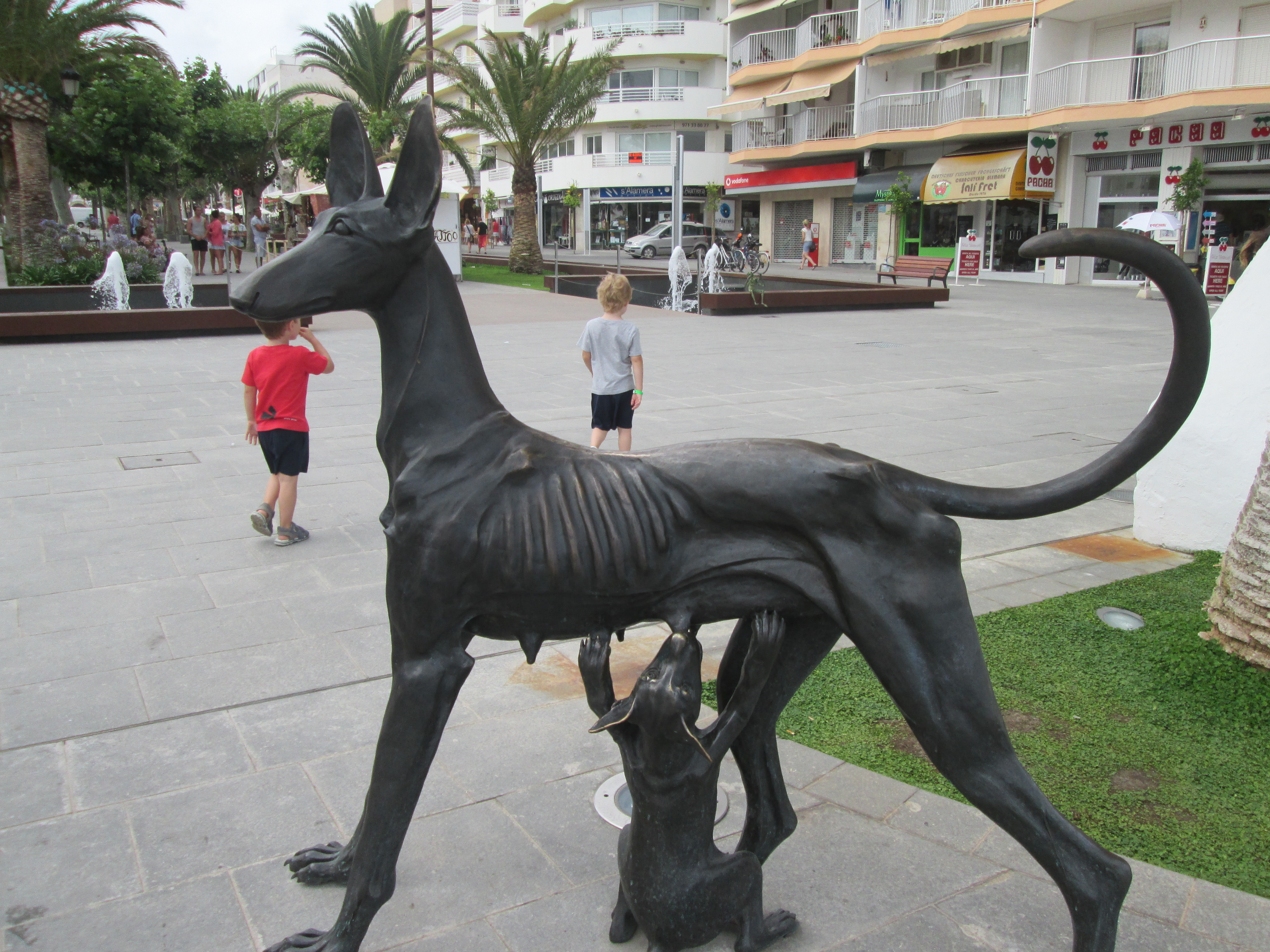
One of the statues dedicated Ibizan Hounds

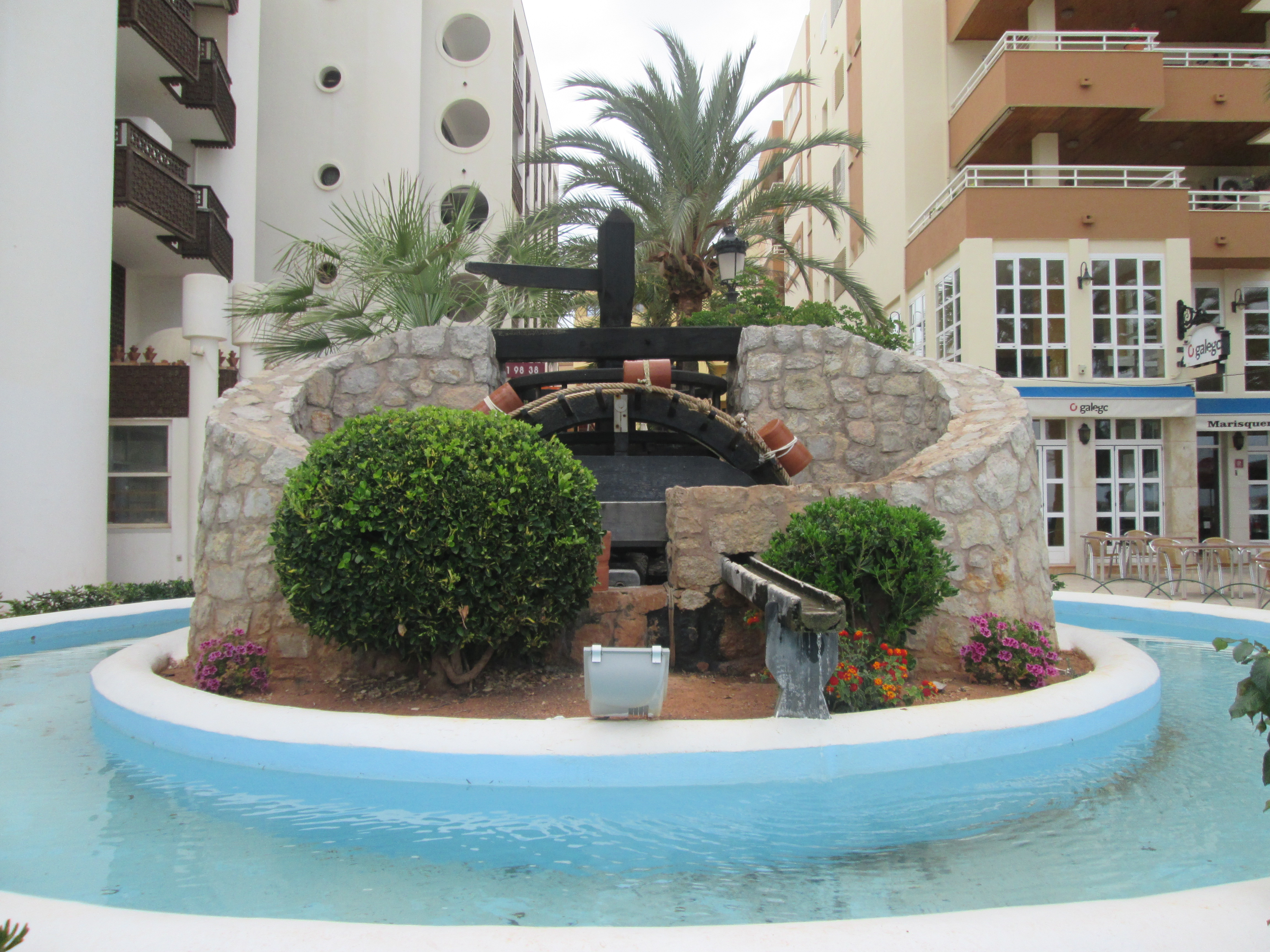
Fountain with mill

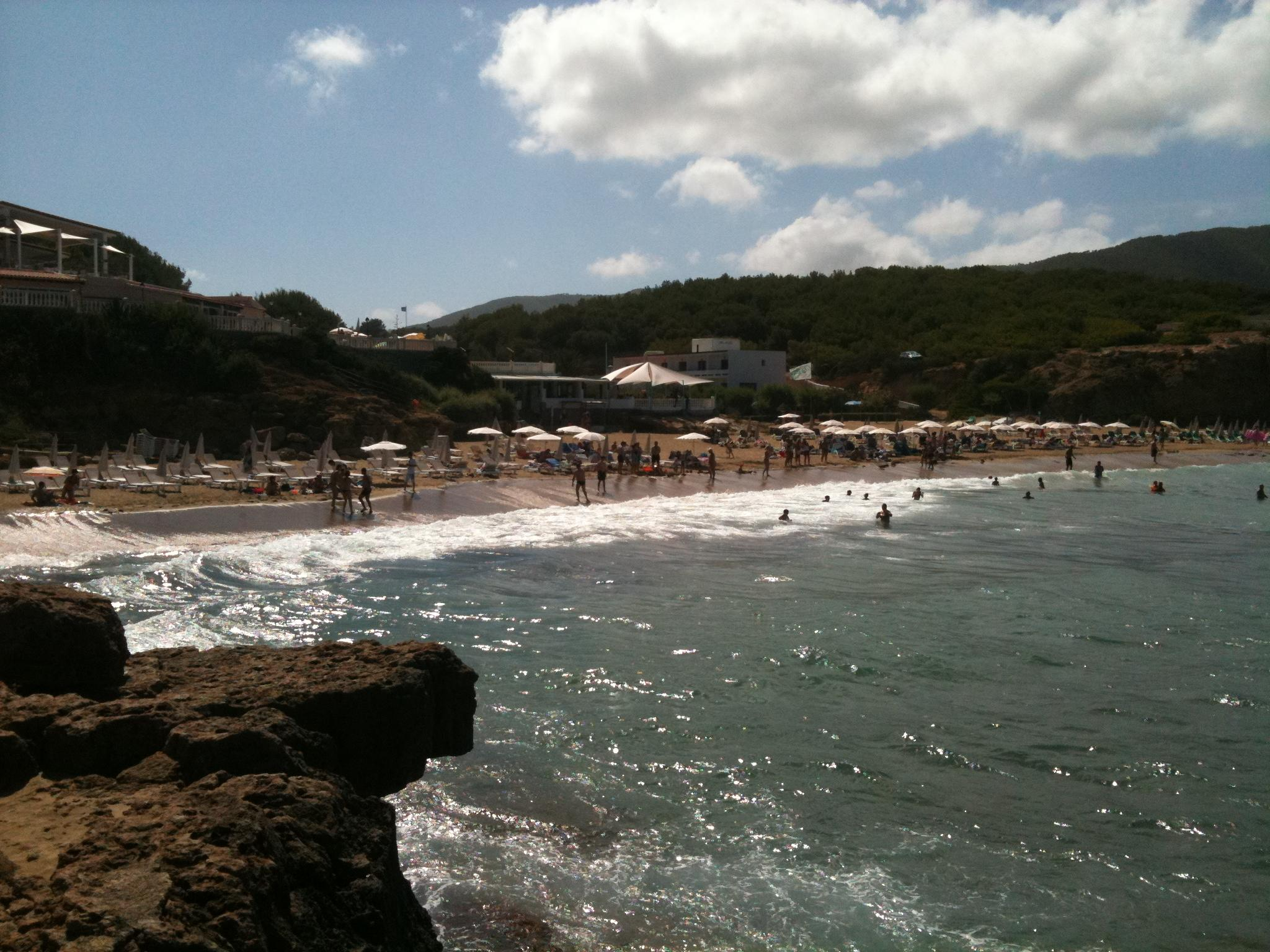
Playa de Es Figueral

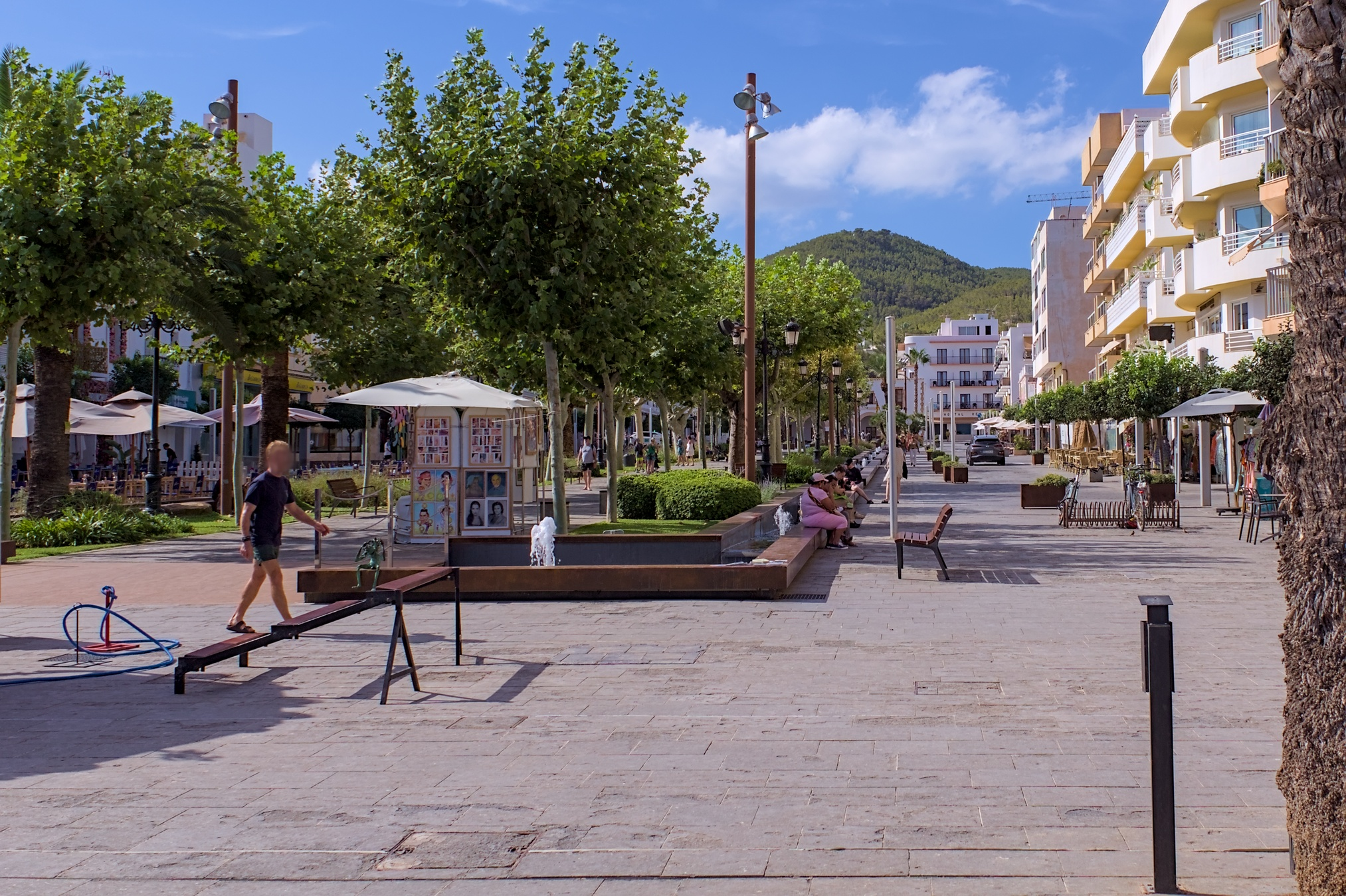
Passeig de s’Alamera

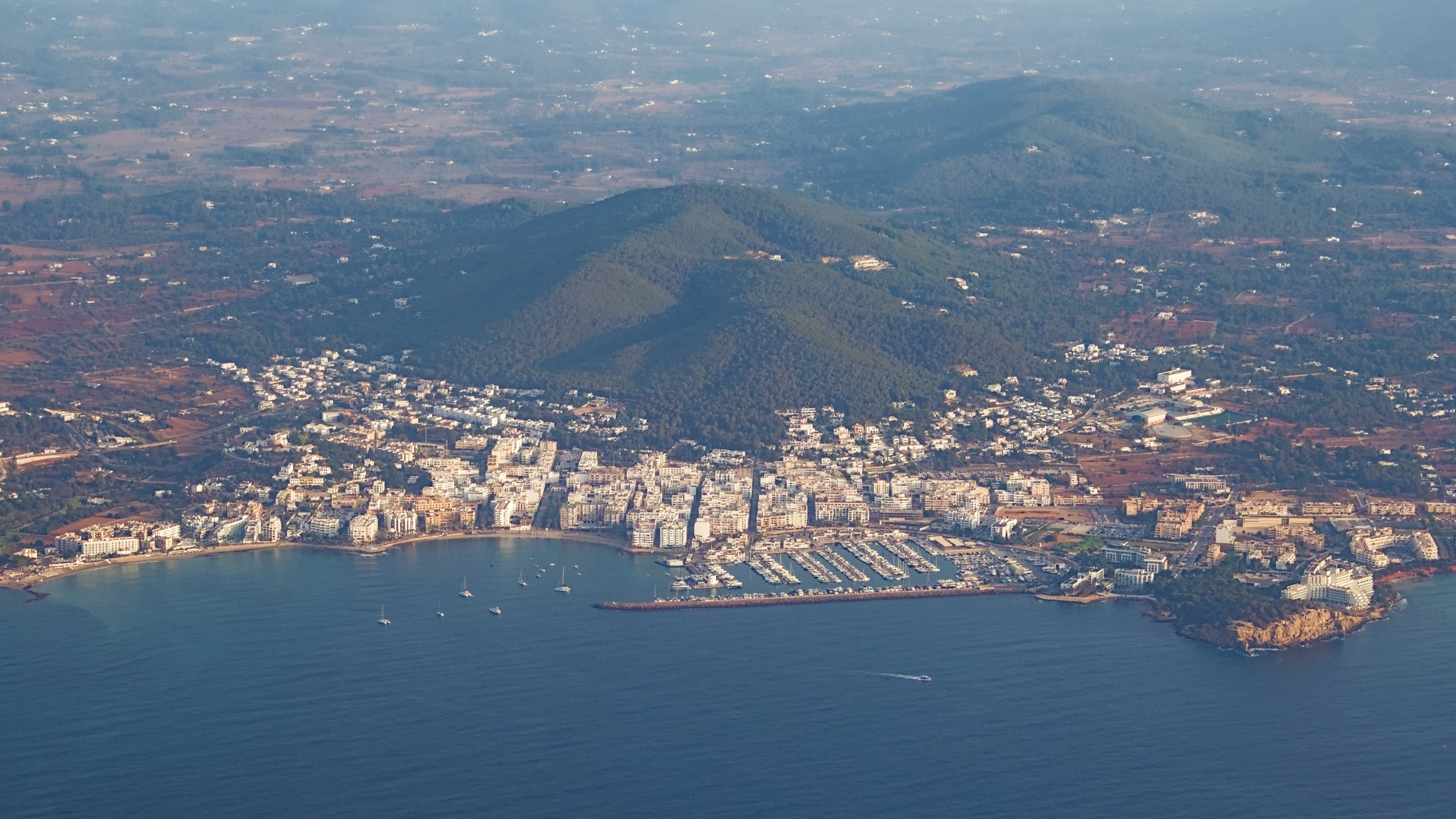
Santa Eulària des Riu from Airplane

== See also ==
- The Municipality of Santa Eulària des Riu
- S’Argamassa Roman Fish Farm to the 1 km east of Santa Eulària des Riu
- Life and Death of a Spanish Town, Novel by Elliot Paul
- The Roman Bridge, Pont Vell
