= Platja Pou d'es Lleo =

Beach in Ibiza

- Beach
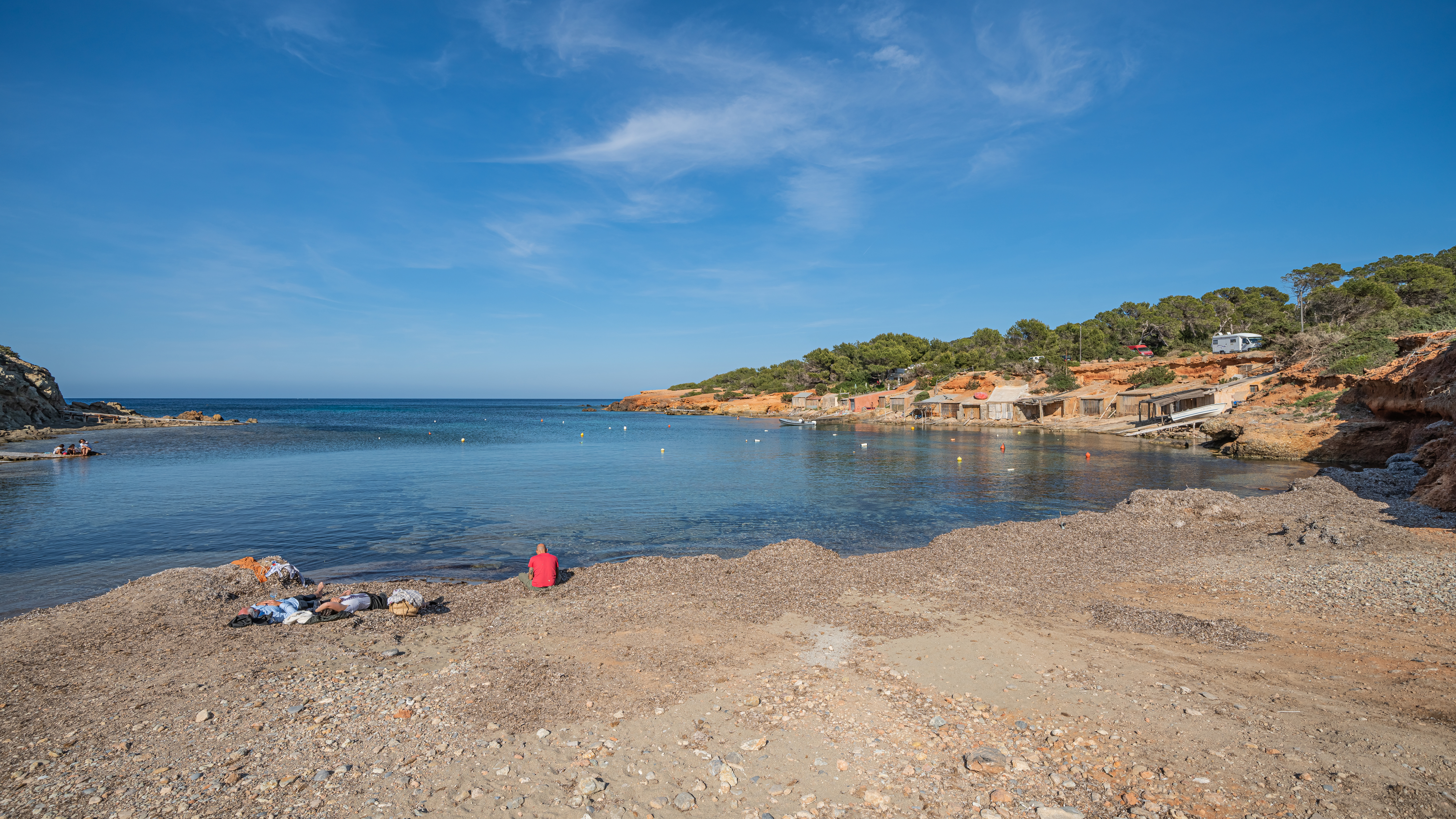
- Platja Pou d'es Lleo

- Location of Platja Pou d'es Lleoon Ibiza
- Coordinates: 39°2′5.31″N 1°36′29.61″E
- Location: Santa Eulària des Riu, Ibiza, Spain

Platja Pou d'es Lleo is a beach on the north east seaboard of the Spanish island of Ibiza. It is in the municipality of Santa Eulària des Riu and is 11.8 kilometres (7.3 mi) north-east of the town of Santa Eulària des Riu, and 6.3 kilometres (3.9 mi) east of the village of San Carlos.

== Description ==
The beach at Pou d'es Lleo is a small crescent of sand encompassed by many typical Ibizan fishermen' rustic boathouses. The cove is a bustling little fishing port and has two seafood restaurants as well as a small beach bar. On both sides of the cove there are cliff paths which lead to many smaller secluded coves. The slipways on the small main beach are always busy with locals and tourists launching their boats. Great care should be taken in the port area when swimming due to the regular launching of boats during the day. The cove is a very popular snorkelling spot because of its interesting rock formations and underwater meadows of Neptune Grass.

== 1936 Republican Landings ==
During the Spanish Civil War Platja Pou d'es Lleo was the location of the re-capture of the island of Ibiza following the rebellion which saw the island fall under the control of Nationalists at the start of the conflict.

On 8 August 1936, a one-thousand strong invasion force of Republican troops was led by Air Force Captain Alberto Bayo. They disembarked in the bay, originating from a task force of Republican navy ships consisting of two destroyers, four transport ships, a submarine and six seaplanes, escorted by the battleship Jaime Primero. The troops came ashore at Platja Pou d'es Lleo by following the advice and guidance of local Republicans from the nearby town of Santa Eulària.

== Gallery ==
Platja Pou d'es Lleo

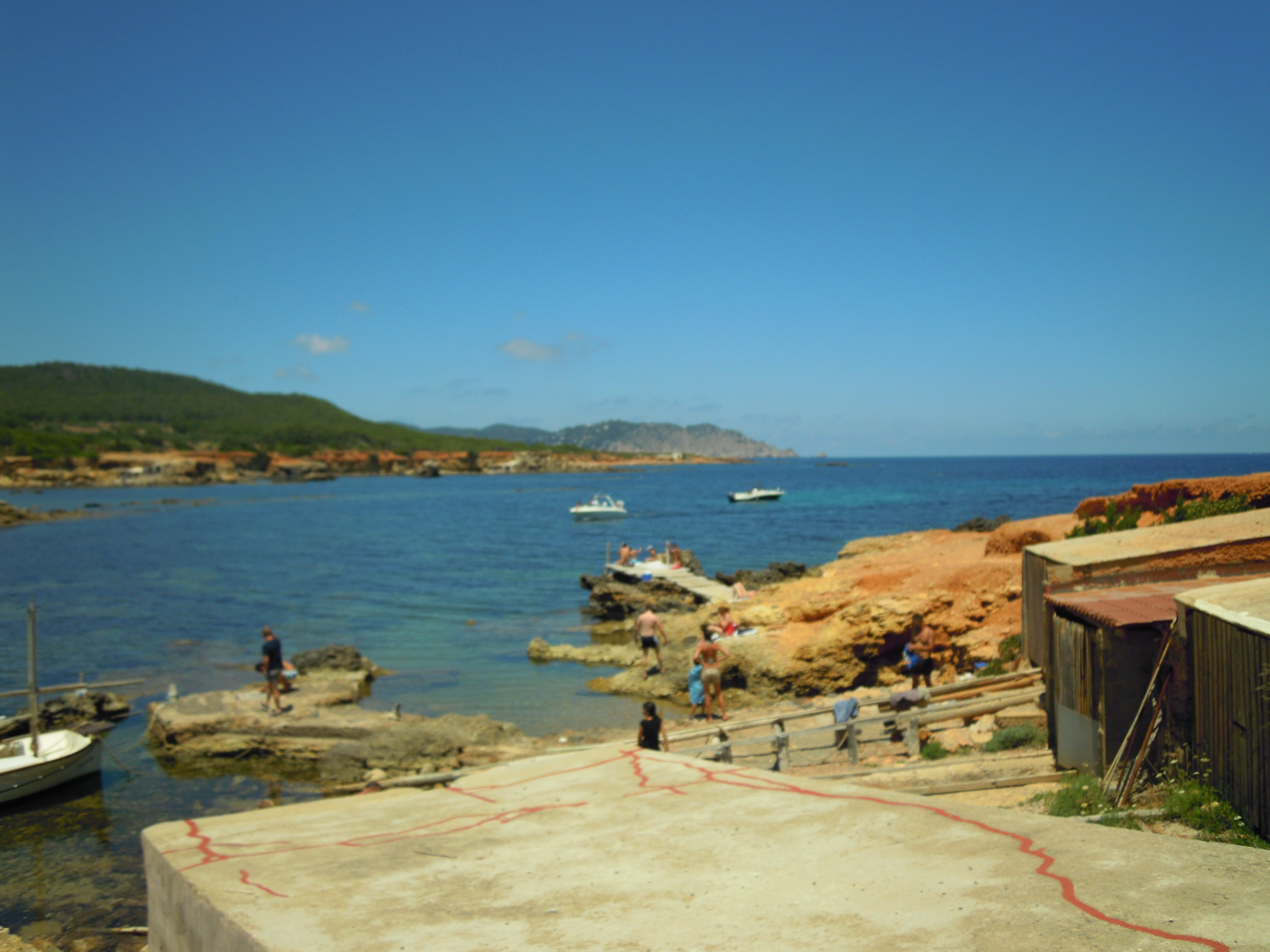
View across the cove

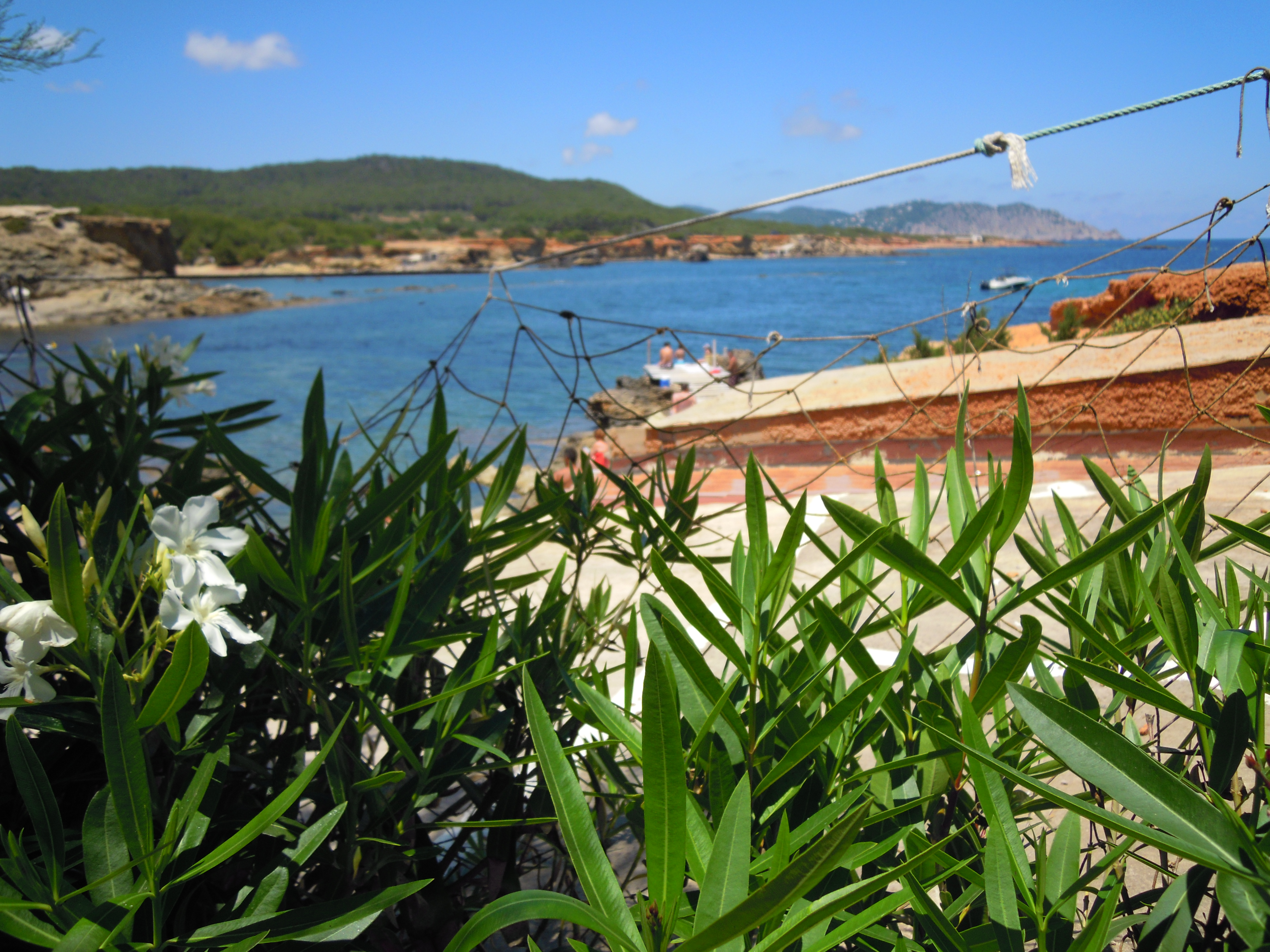
