= Platja des Niu Blau =

Beach in Ibiza, Spain

- Beach
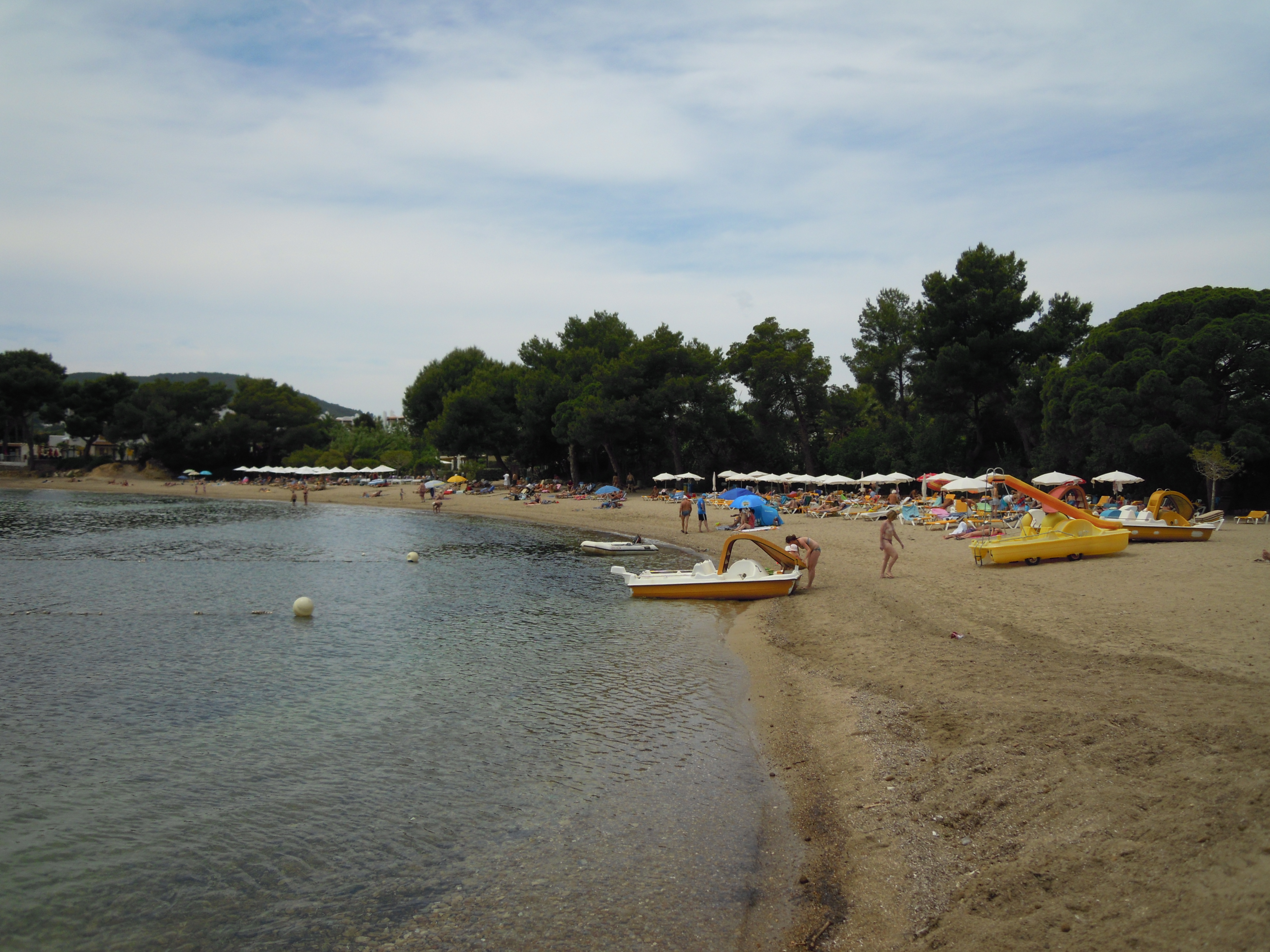
- Platja des Niu Blau

- Location of Platja des Niu Blau on Ibiza
- Coordinates: 38°59′33″N 1°33′9″E
- Location: Santa Eulària des Riu, Ibiza, Spain

Platja des Niu Blau is a beach in the south east seaboard of the Spanish island of Ibiza. It is part of the municipality of Santa Eulària des Riu and is located 1.4 miles (2.3 km) east of the town of Santa Eulària des Riu, and 2.0 miles (3.2 km) west of the beach resort of Es Canar. It is a small, sheltered sandy cove, fringed by pine forests. The beach serves as a seaside retreat and features basic amenities for tourism and moderate visitor usage.

== Etymology ==
Its name, "Niu Blau" ("Blue Nest"), stems from artist Rigoberto Soler’s 1930s painting studio established here. It was a small dwelling built on the cove built by the Valencian impressionist artist for himself. He painted many works featuring the landscape around Santa Eulària des Riu its environment.

== Geography ==
Platja des Niu Blau beach in located on the south east seaboard of the Spanish island of Ibiza. It is part of the municipality of Santa Eulària des Riu and is located 1.4 miles (2.3 km) east of the town of Santa Eulària des Riu, and 2.0 miles (3.2 km) west of the beach resort of Es Canar. It is a small cove nestled within pine and bamboo forest, providing natural shade and visual serenity. The cove is about 130–170 m (430–560 ft) long and 12–15 m (39–49 ft) wide, lined by sandy shores and fringed with gravel and rocky outcrops that connect into pine-clad hills. It lies at the mouth of Torrent de Arabí, featuring a gently sloping sandy bottom mixed with pebbles and rocks and a sheltered bay.

== Tourism ==
The beach itself is uninhabited, but primarily serves the local residents of Santa Eulària des Riu and surrounding resort communities. During peak summer months, occupancy increases, but it is quieter compared to nearby larger beaches. The semi-urban, laid-back setup supports local restaurants and a small tourism economy, but maintains a low-profile ambiance. The largely leisure-driven beach has sunbed/umbrella rentals, a seasonal beach bar/eatery, and pedal-boat and watersports rentals.

== Gallery ==
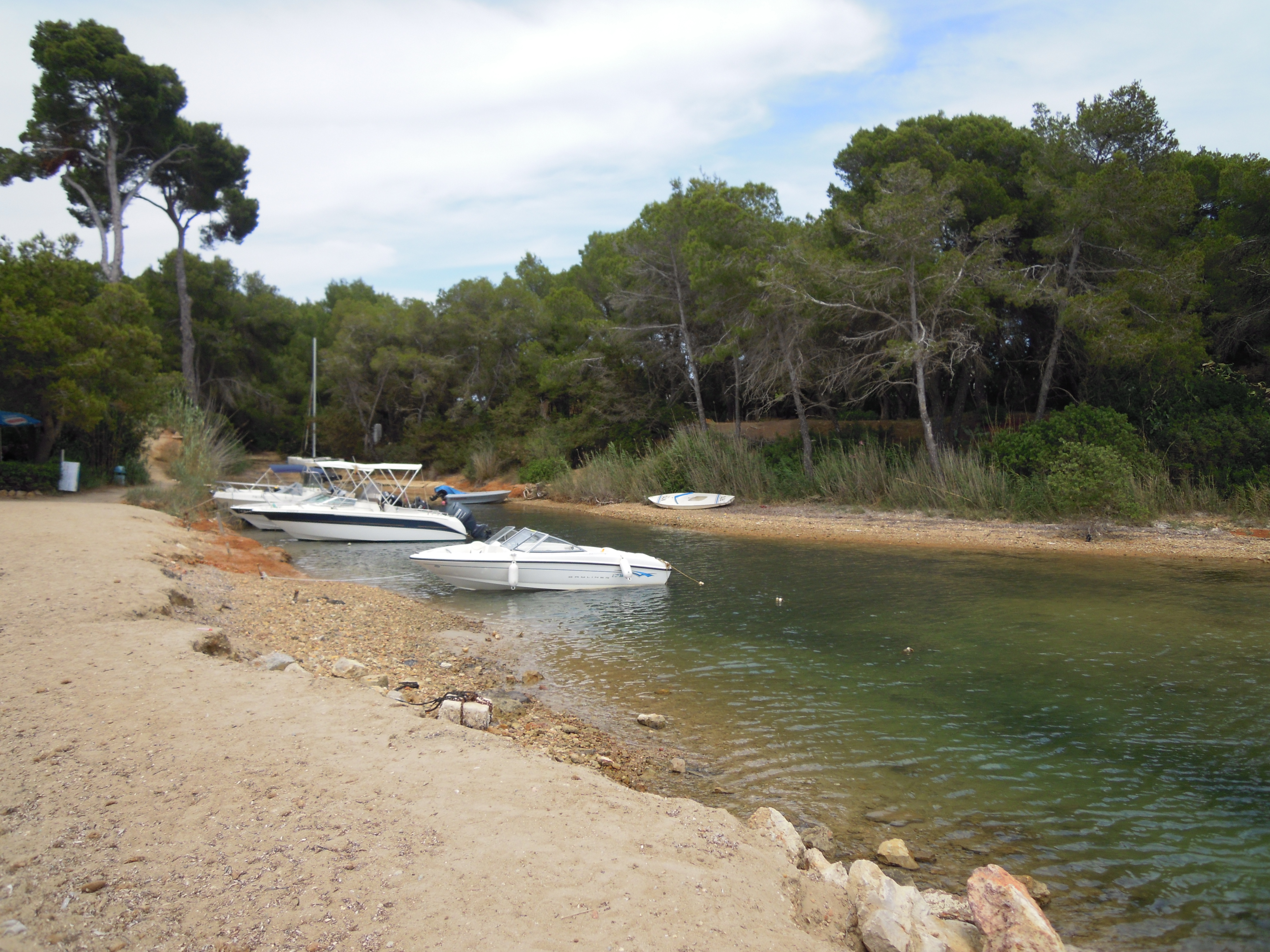
The small cove and creek

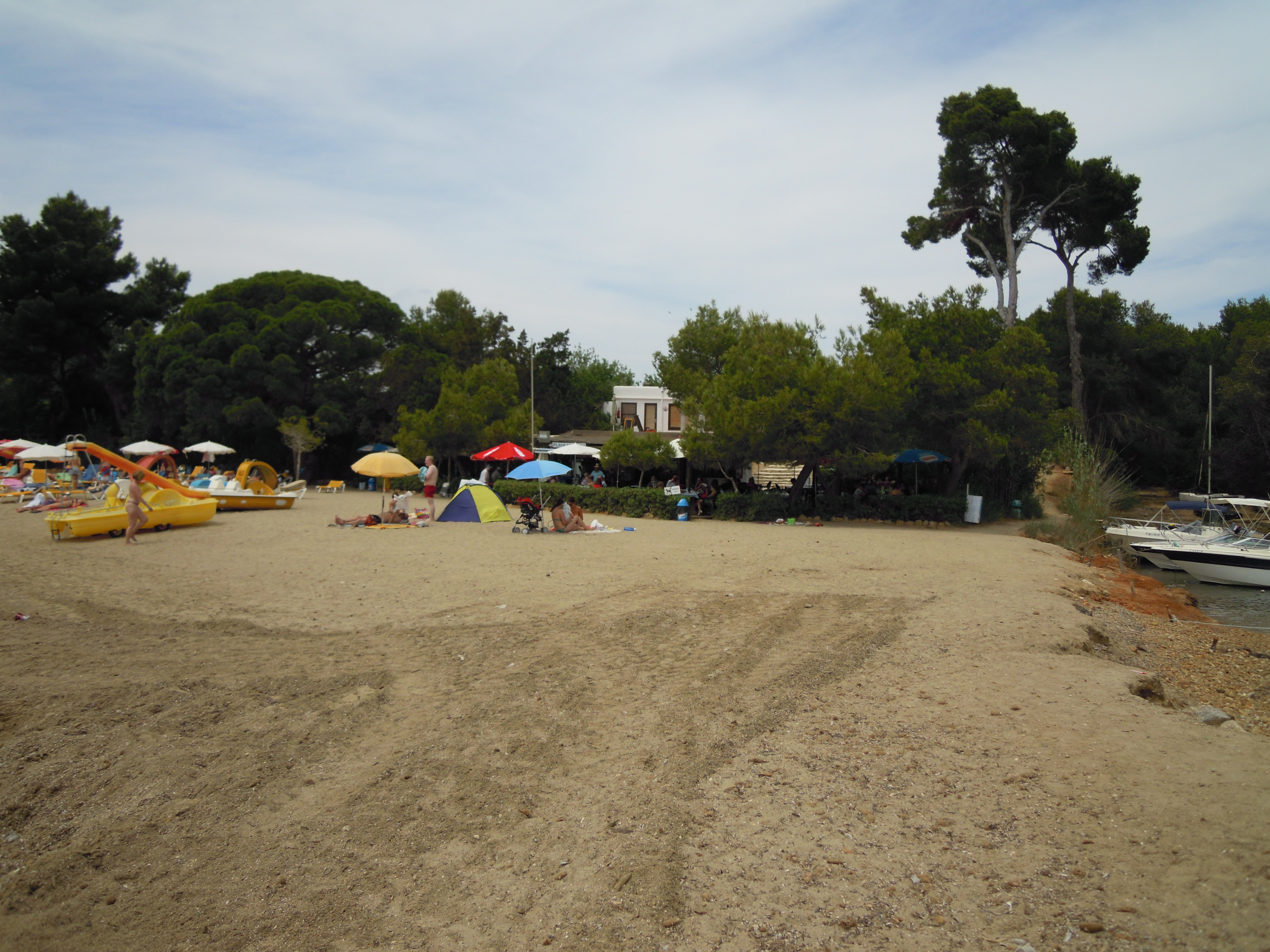
The beach bar and restaurant

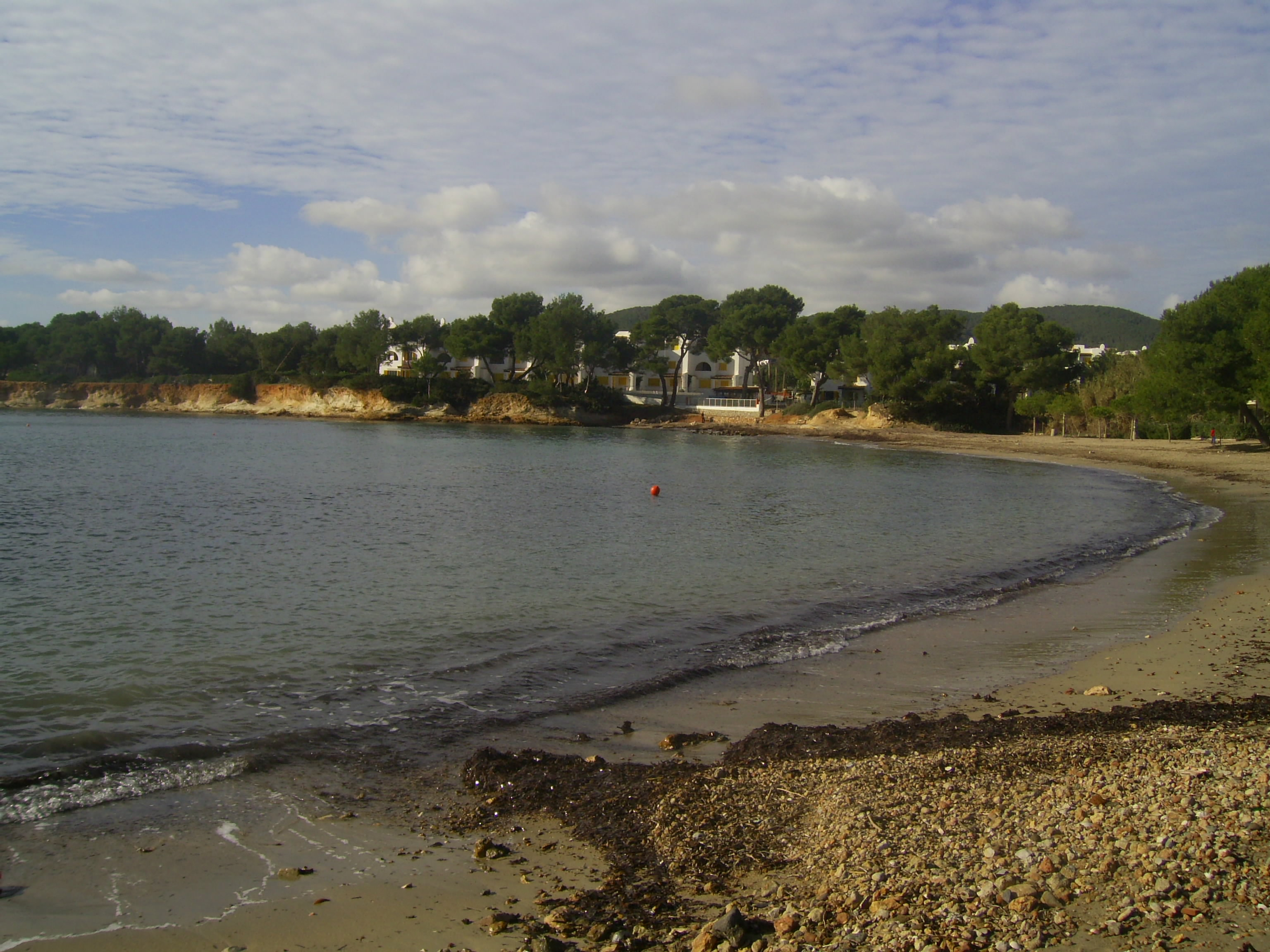
The Bay
