= Cala Pada =

Beach on Ibiza, Spain

- Beach
- Location of Cala Pada on Ibiza
- Coordinates: 38°59′14″N 1°34′24″E
- Location: Santa Eulària des Riu, Ibiza, Spain

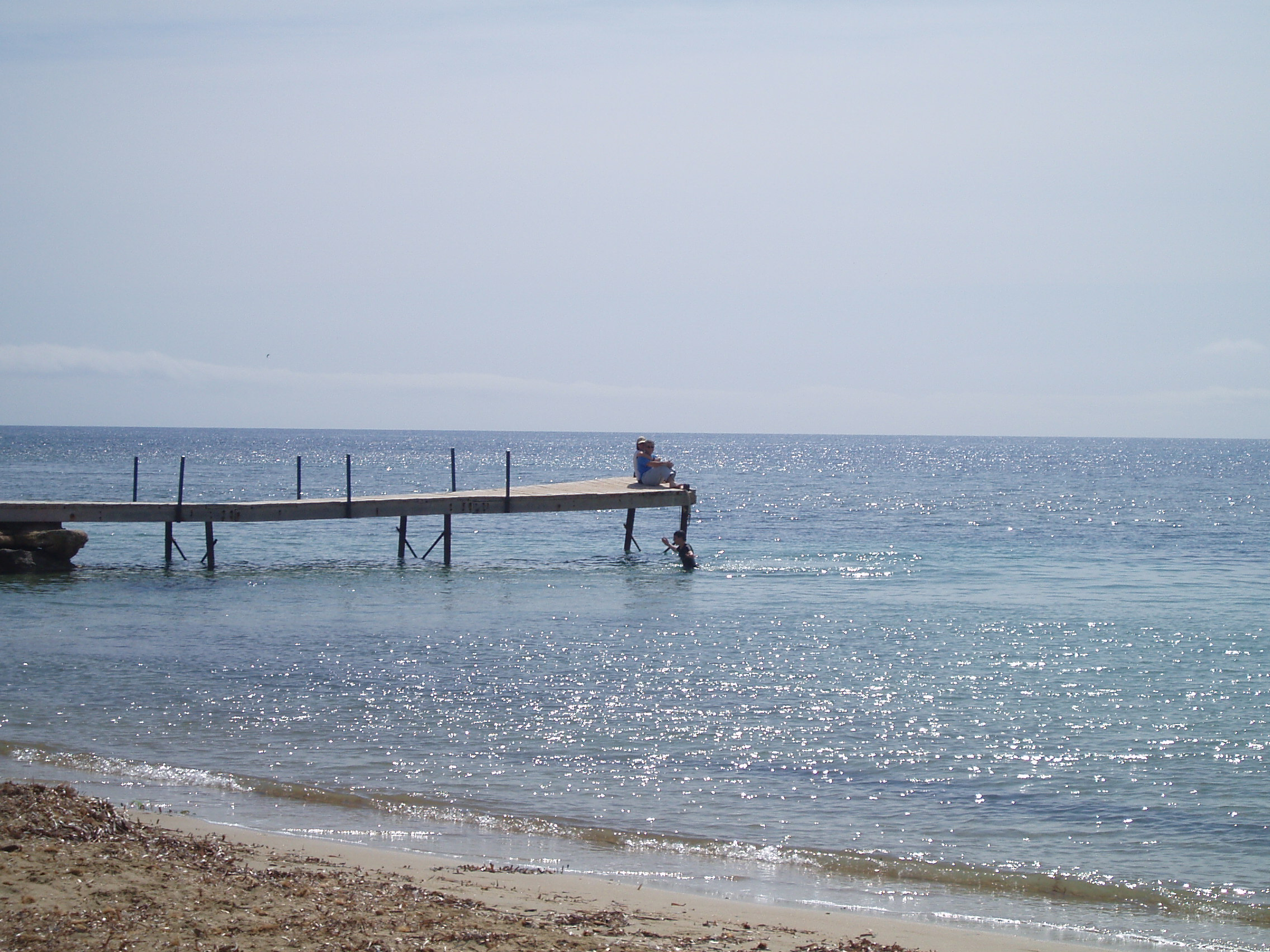
Cala Pada.JPG

Cala Pada is a beach on the south east seaboard of the Spanish island of Ibiza. It is in the municipality of Santa Eulària des Riu and is 2.7 miles (4.3 km) east of the town of Santa Eulària des Riu, and 1.9 miles (3.1 km) south west of the beach resort of Es Canar.

== Description ==
Cala Pada beach is a broad sandy stretch of beach backed by a wood of pine and juniper trees. The offshore reefs protect the bay from the sea, making it popular with the island's windsurfers when the south wind blows. From the beach there are views to several small offshore islands including Illa de Santa Eulària, Illa Rodona and En Caragoler.

=== Illa Rodona ===
On 17 January 1913, a steamship called the SS Mallorca ran aground on a reef around Illa Rodona. The crew and passengers were rescued from the ship by the local fishermen of Santa Eulària des Riu. There is a stone memorial to commemorate the rescue in front of the Ajuntament (town hall) in the plaçe d' Espanya, Santa Eulària des Riu.

== Gallery ==
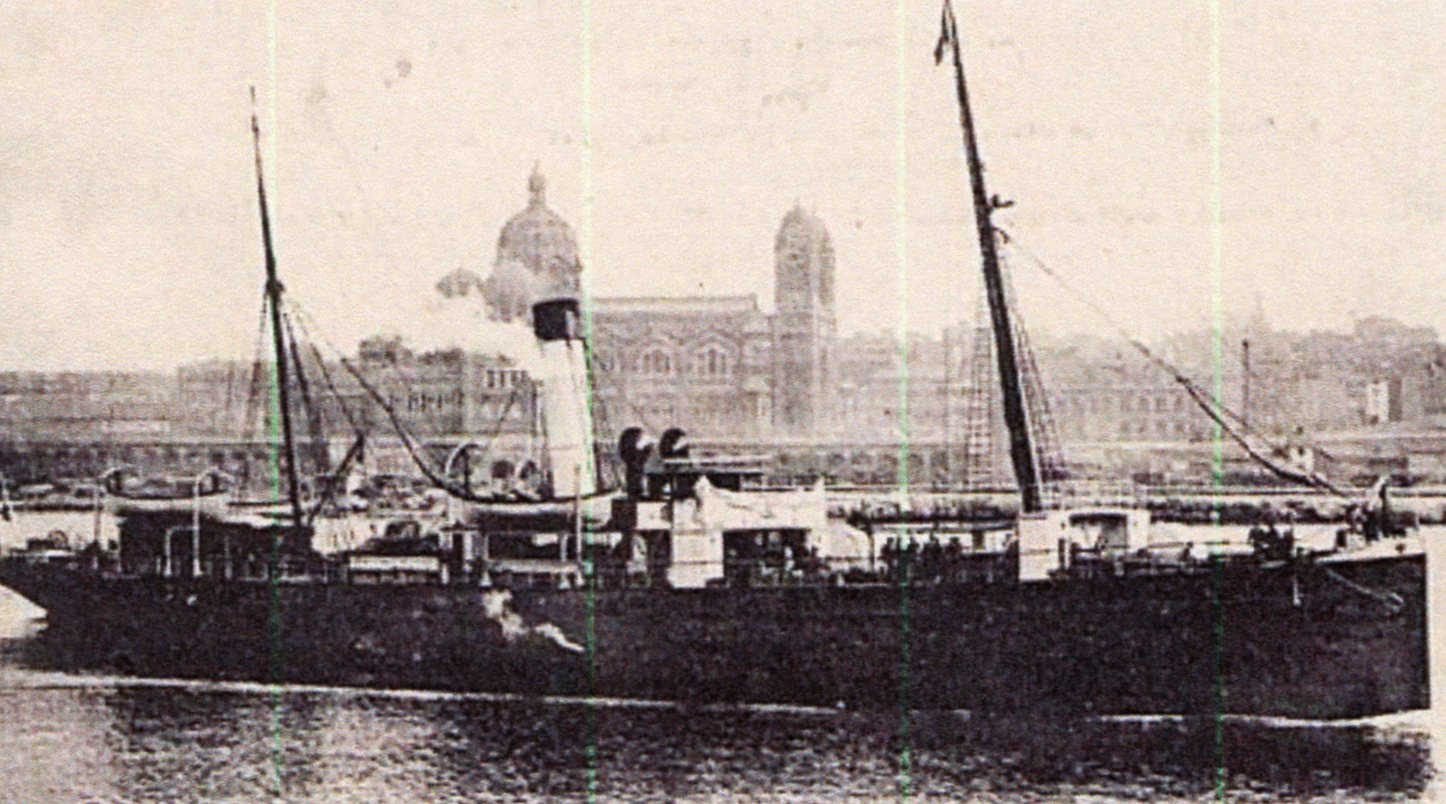
The SS Mallorca which sank on 17 January 1913 after running aground on a reef around Illa Rodona
