= Jesús (Ibiza) =

- Village
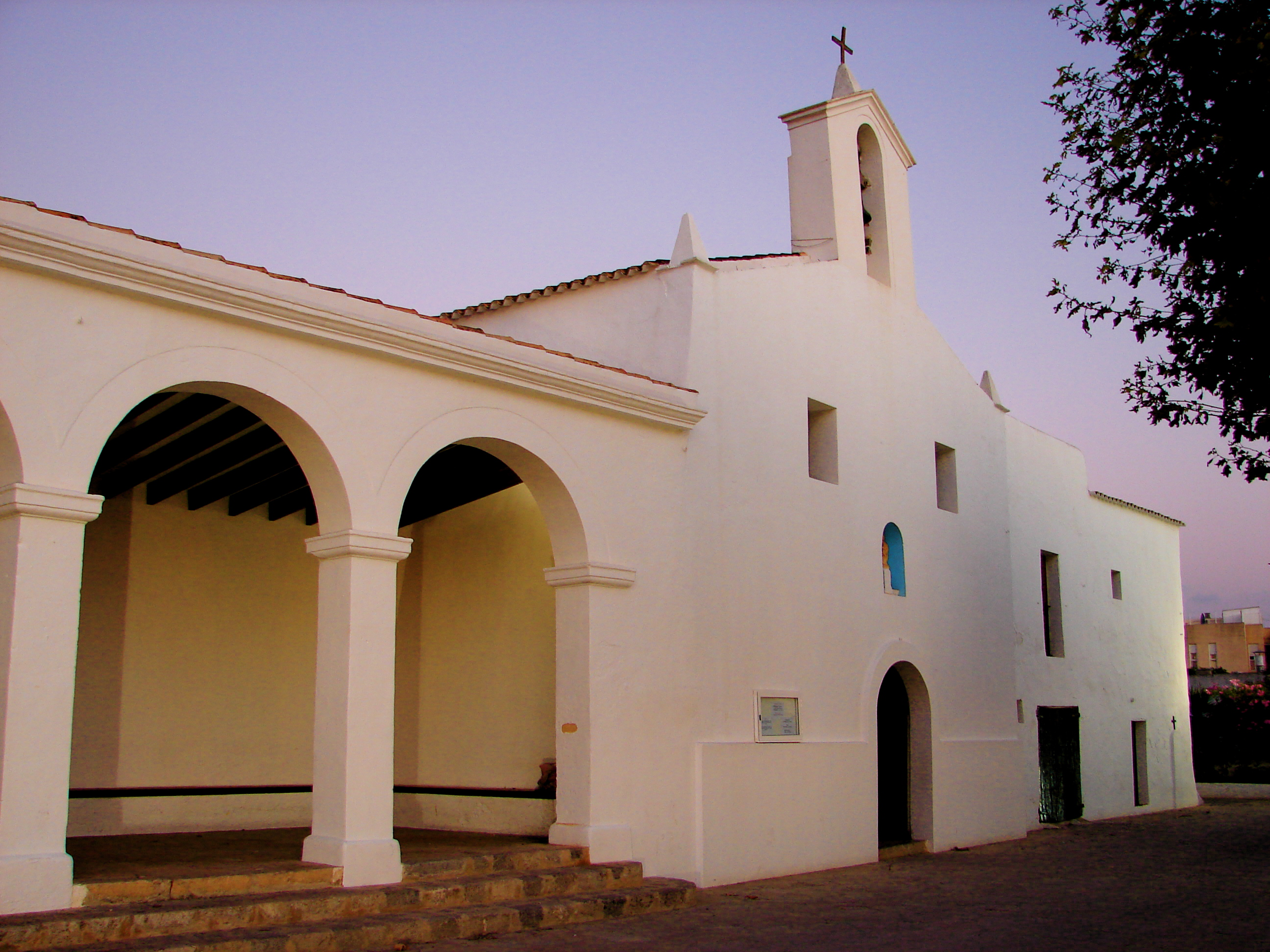
- The Parish Church

- Location of the village in Ibiza
- Coordinates: 38°55′51″N 1°26′58″E
- Country: Spain
- Region: Balearic Islands

Population (2006)
  - Total: 4,499
- Time zone: UTC+1 (CET)
  - Summer (DST): UTC+2 (CEST)

Nostra Senyora de Jesús is a village located on the northern side of Ibiza Bay, on the Spanish island of Ibiza. It is part of the municipality of Santa Eulària des Riu and is situated along the EI-100 road. The village lies 3.2 kilometers (2 miles) north of Ibiza Town and 10.8 kilometers (6.7 miles) from Ibiza Airport.

== Description ==
Jesús is positioned close to Ibiza Town, along the road to Cala Llonga. Due to its proximity, it has become more suburban, offering a variety of restaurants and small shops. The village is close to two beaches, Platja S'Estanyol and Talamanca.

=== The Church of Nostra Mare de Jesús ===
The Church of Nostra Mare de Jesús is located in the center of the village. The church, believed to be the oldest on the island, was originally established by Franciscan friars in 1498. However, the Franciscans left the site after fifty years, and it was taken over by the Dominican order, who eventually relocated to Dalt Vila due to concerns over pirate raids. In 1755, the former monastic building was repurposed into a parish church.

The church’s altarpiece was painted around the year 1500 by Rodrigo de Osona. The altarpiece consists of 25 painted panels. The central piece depicts the Virgin and Child, while other panels illustrate scenes such as the Annunciation, Nativity of Jesus, Resurrection, and Ascension, as well as various saints.
