= Platja S'Estanyol =

Beach in Ibiza, Spain

- Beach
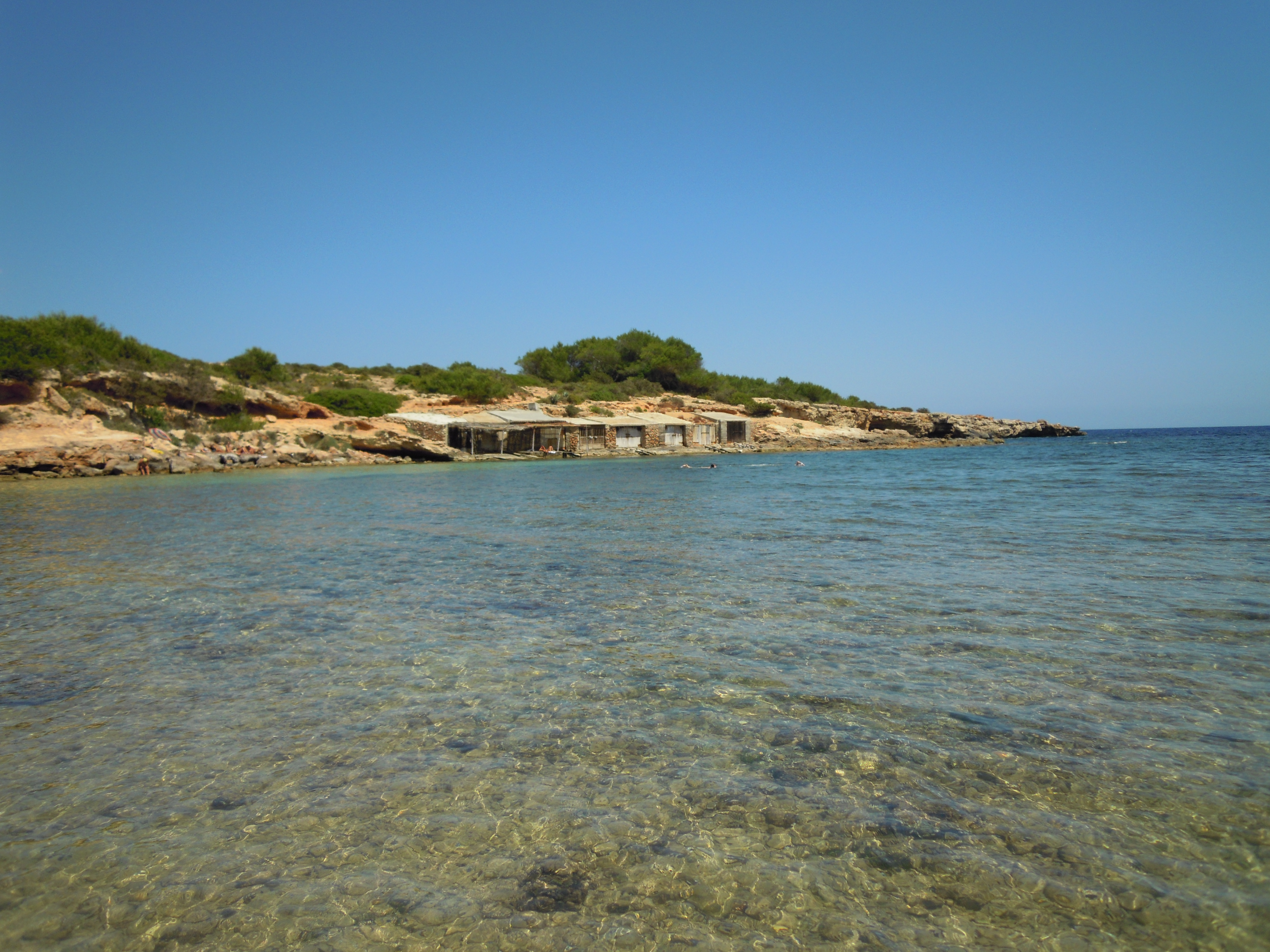
- Platja S'Estanyol

- Location of Platja S'Estanyol on Ibiza
- Coordinates: 38°54′56″N 1°28′28″E
- Location: Santa Eulària des Riu, Ibiza, Spain

Platja S'Estanyol is a beach on the south east seaboard of the Spanish island of Ibiza. It is in the municipality of Santa Eulària des Riu and is 9.4 miles (15.1 km) south west of the town of Santa Eulària des Riu, and 1.8 miles (2.9 km) west of the village of Jesús.

== Environment ==
S'Estanyol is a very quiet beach and is set in unspoiled natural environment. It is an ideal beach for the sunbather as it is an east facing beach and is protected from the often prevailing wind along this stretch of the Ibiza coastline. Along the north-eastern edge of the cove there are several typical Fishermans rustic boathouses. On the opposite side of the cove there are many areas of flat rock formations which are ideal for sunbathing with a bit of privacy. The Water in the cove is crystal clear and very calm, making this a very safe place youngsters to go swimming and is a popular snorkelling spot with hidden underwater caves.

== Location ==
S'Estanyol is reached along an un-metalled camino, or lane which can prove difficult to find. The cove is 3.5 kilometres (2.2 mi) from the nearest village which is called Jesús. Just behind the beach there is a very small car park. To the back of the beach there is one beach restaurant bar.

== Gallery ==
Platja S'Estanyol

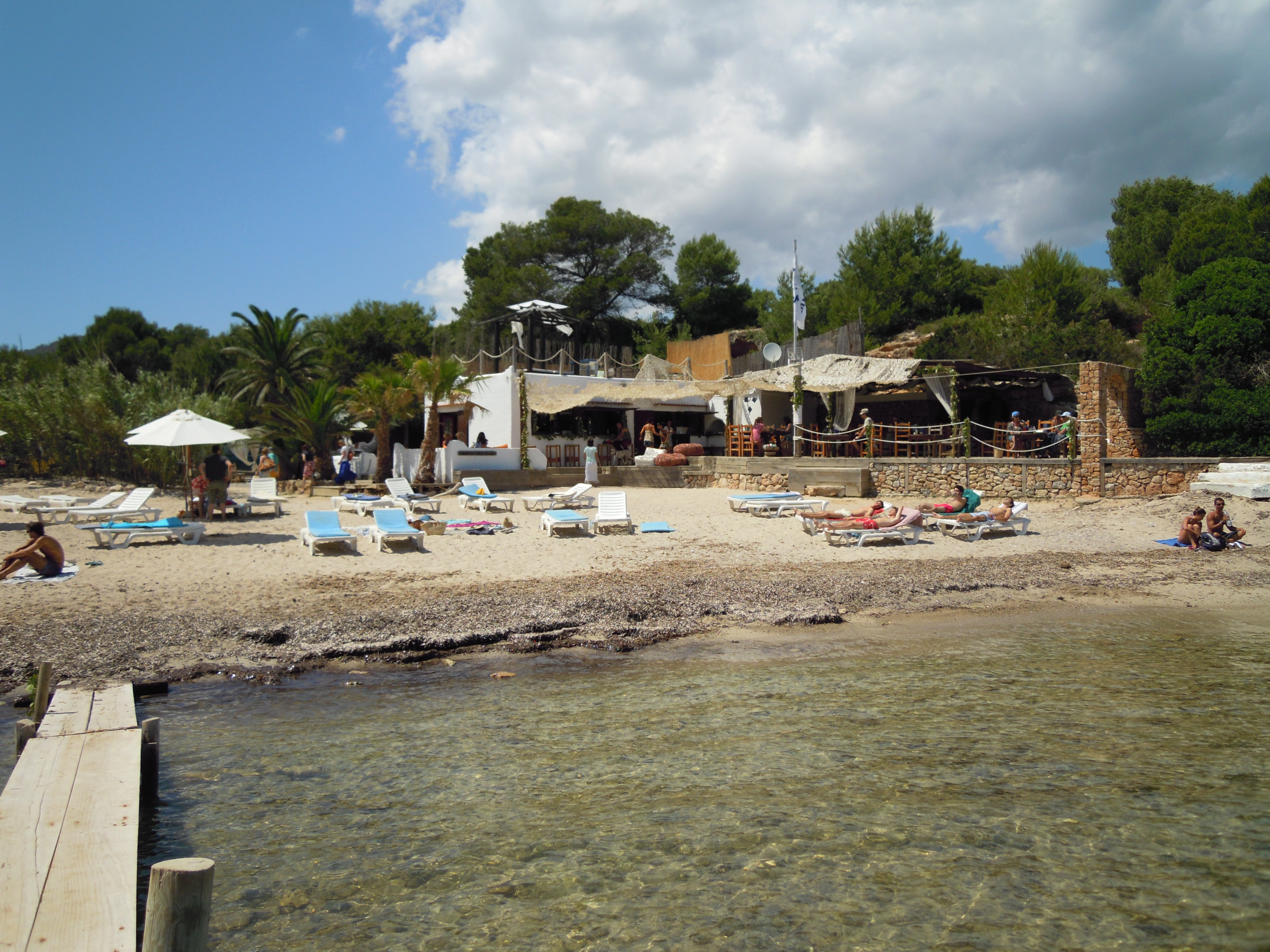
Beach bar and restaurant

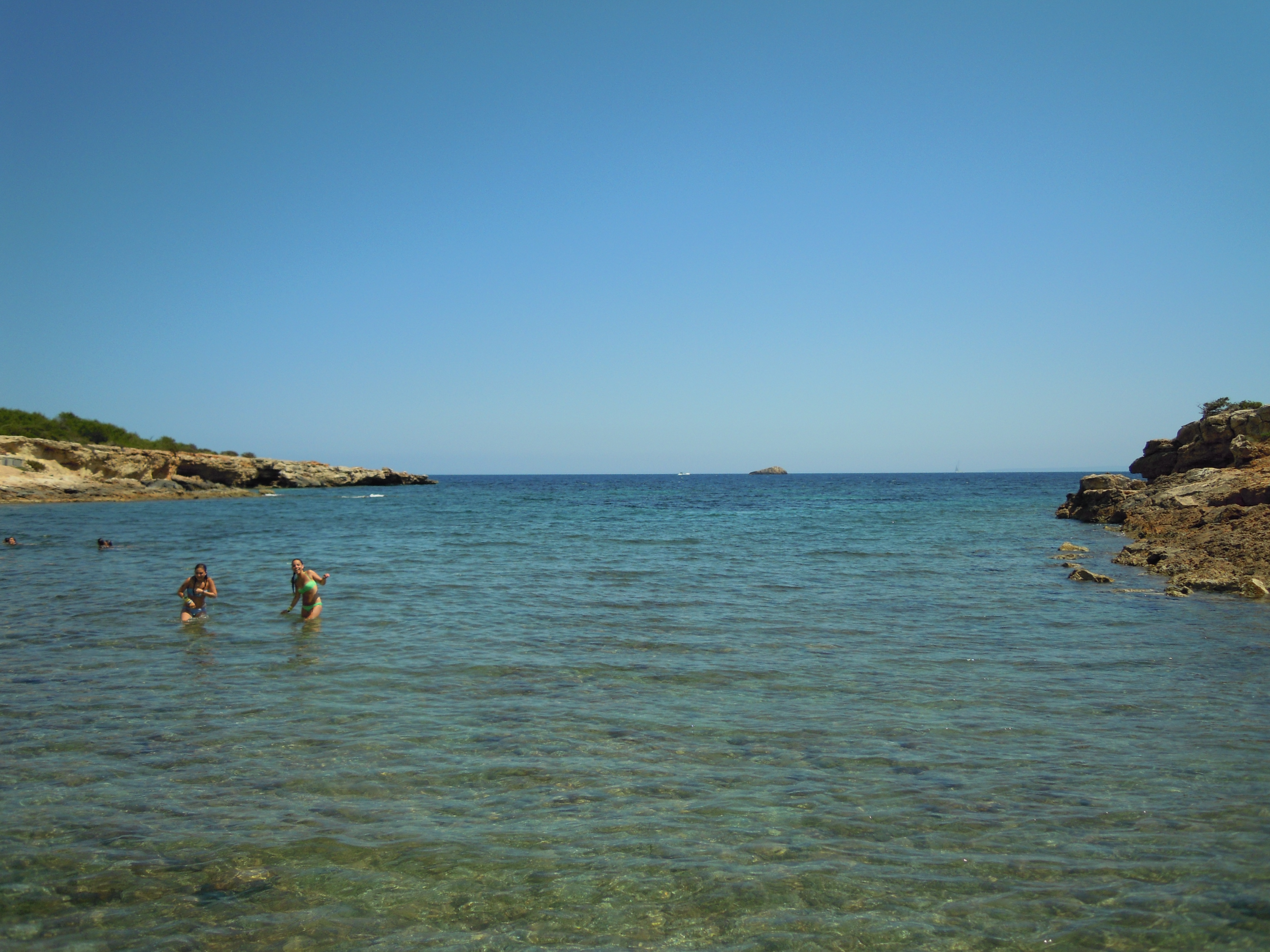
The cove

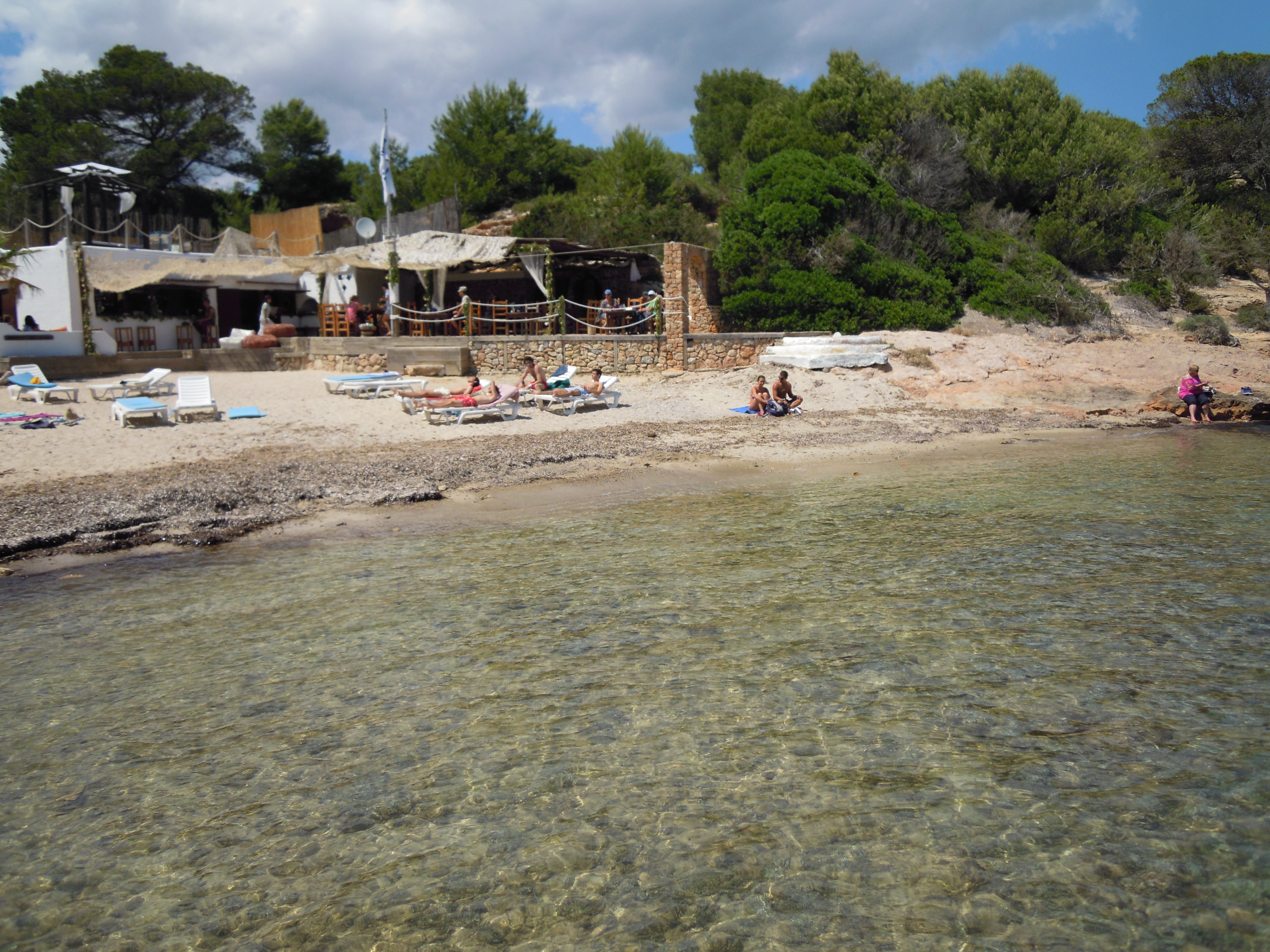
Clear waters of the cove

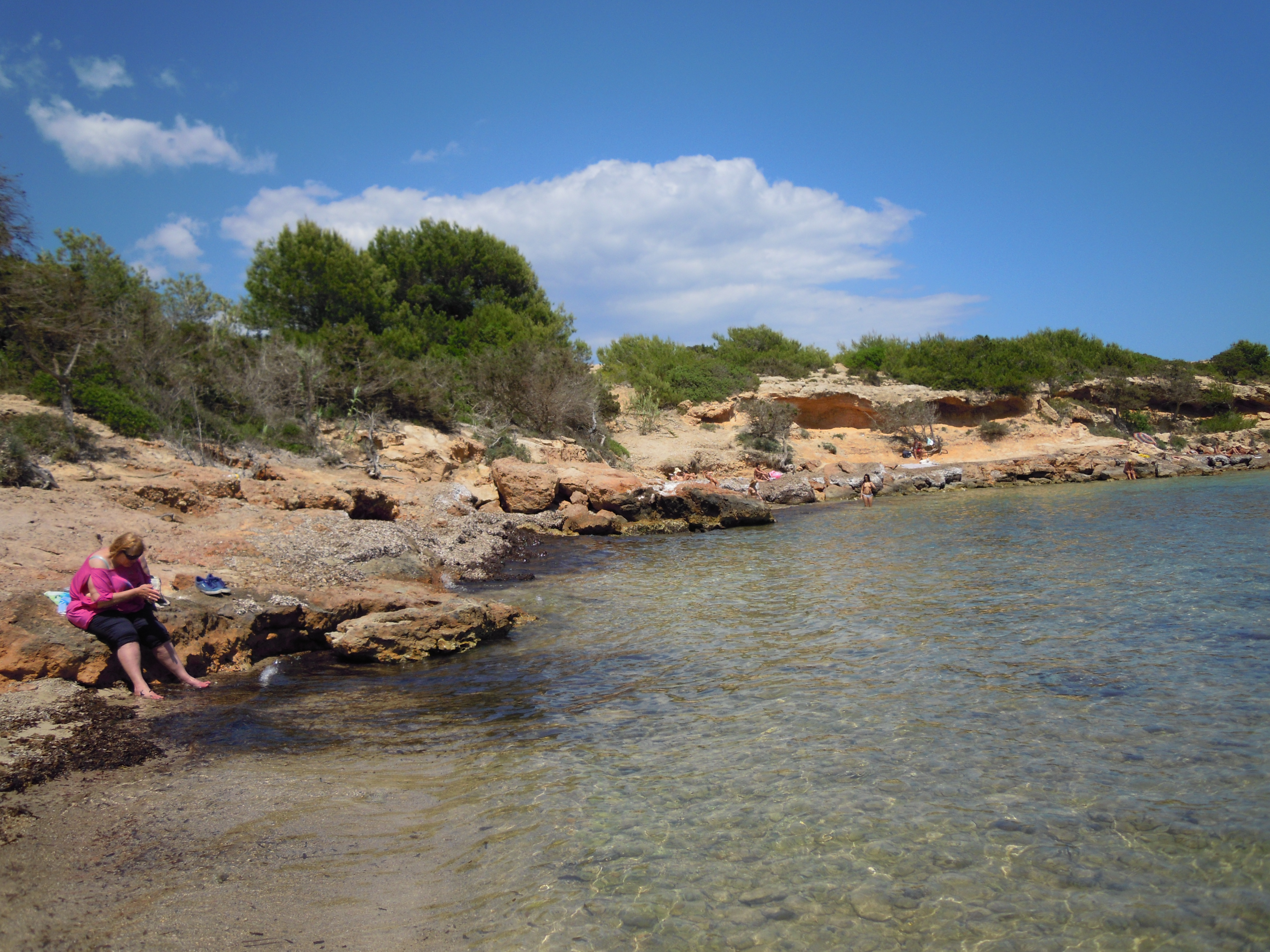
The rocky shoreline of Platja S'Estanyol
