= Platja Es Canar =

Beach in Ibiza, Spain

- Beach
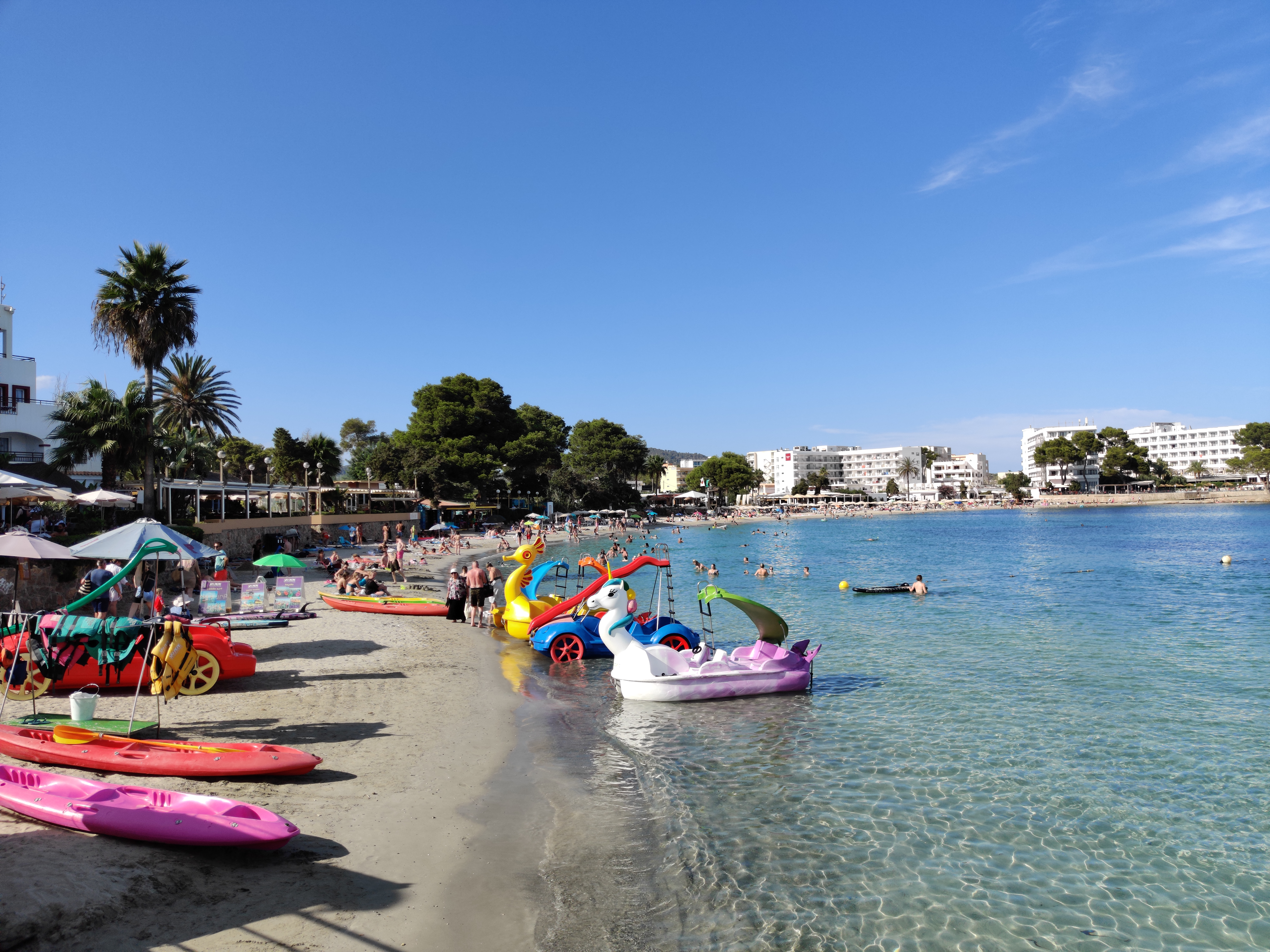
- Platja Es Canar

- Location of Platja des Es Canar on Ibiza
- Coordinates: 39°0′7″N 1°34′41″E
- Location: Santa Eulària des Riu, Ibiza, Spain

Platja Es Canar is the main beach within the beach resort of Es Canar which is on the south east seaboard of the Spanish island of Ibiza. It is in the municipality of Santa Eulària des Riu

== Description ==
This is a sandy beach in a horseshoe shaped bay. The sand is fine and of light colour. The water is clear and clean and the sea bed has a gentle slope. This beach guarded by lifeguards. At the southern end of the beach is a small harbour . To the back of the beach there are a number of large four and five storey tourist hotels and all along the bay there are bars, restaurants and beach shops.

== See also ==
- The beach resort of Es Canar
