= Rigoberto Soler =

Spanish painter (1896–1968)

Rigoberto Soler Pérez
- Born: 1896; Alcoy, Alicante, Spain
- Died: 1968 (aged 71–72)
- Known for: Painting, drawing, music
- Movement: Post-Impressionism

Rigoberto Soler Pérez (1896–1968) was a Spanish post-Impressionist painter.

== Early life ==
Rigoberto Soler was born in the city of Alcoy in the province of Alicante, Spain in 1896. His father, with whom he clashed, was an administrator in the city’s recording office. His father wanted him to pursue a career in banking for his son, but Soler had different ideas. He trained in the School of Arts and Crafts in Valencia, and later at the School of Fine Arts of San Carlos in Valencia. Following the completion of his training, he won a prize in the National Exhibition of Fine Arts in Madrid with a painting entitled "Entre Naranjos". Following his success, Soler became a regular participant in numerous national exhibitions. In 1926, he was granted a silver medal for a painting called "Idyll Ibiza" which is now exhibited in the Museum of Bordeaux.

== Ibiza ==
In 1925, Soler left the mainland and moved to the island of Ibiza. He lived in the then village of Santa Eulària des Riu. At first he lived on a small cove close to the village where he built himself a small dwelling which he called the Niu Blau or Blue Nest. The small beach is now named Platja des Niu Blau in homage to the painter’s house. He lived in Niu Blau with a Spanish beauty called Pilar, who was his girlfriend and model. Soler painted many works featuring the landscape around Santa Eulària des Riu its environment. He also painted his neighbours and friends in and around Santa Eulària. He also painted Pilar in various poses and guises. He was a popular much loved character around the village and was mentioned many times by the Author Elliot Paul in his best selling Novel, Life and Death of a Spanish Town, which was all about experiences in the village during the Spanish Civil War. Following his success winning the Silver medal in Madrid, he used the prize money to build himself a house and studio on the hill above the village. By this time Pilar had left him and moved back to mainland Spain. Soler then married a German lady by the name of Clare Sinderman.

== Later life ==
In 1943 he was given a professorship in the School of Arts and Crafts in Santa Jordi, Barcelona. He and his wife moved to the city, becoming a teacher at the school. In 1956, with much regret, he sold his house in Santa Eulària. He stayed at the school until he retired in 1964. He died in 1968.

== Gallery ==
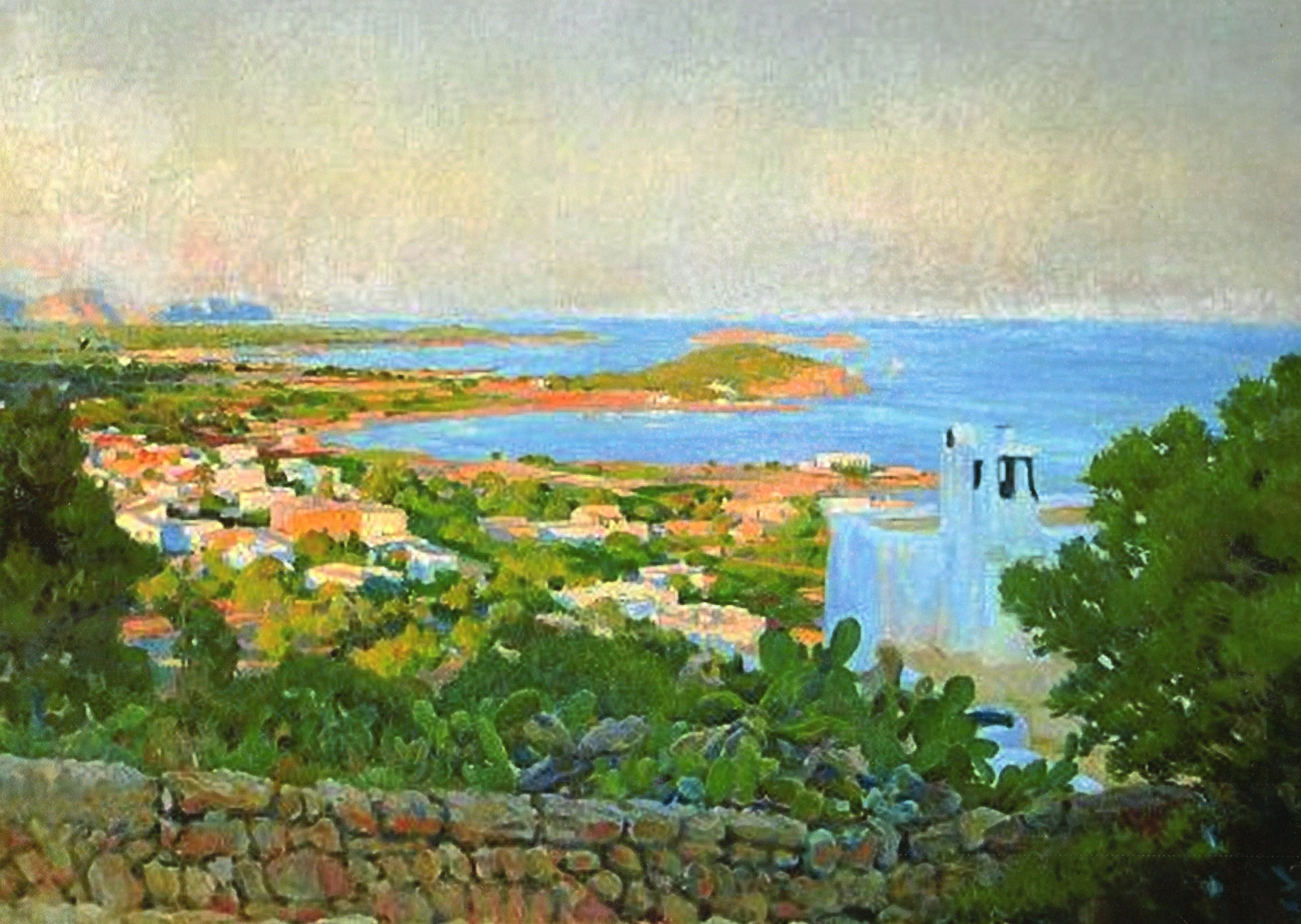
View of Santa Eulària (1943) by Rigoberto Soler
