= Cala Llonga =

Settlement and beach resort on Ibiza, Spain

Coordinates: 38°57′14″N 1°31′06″E

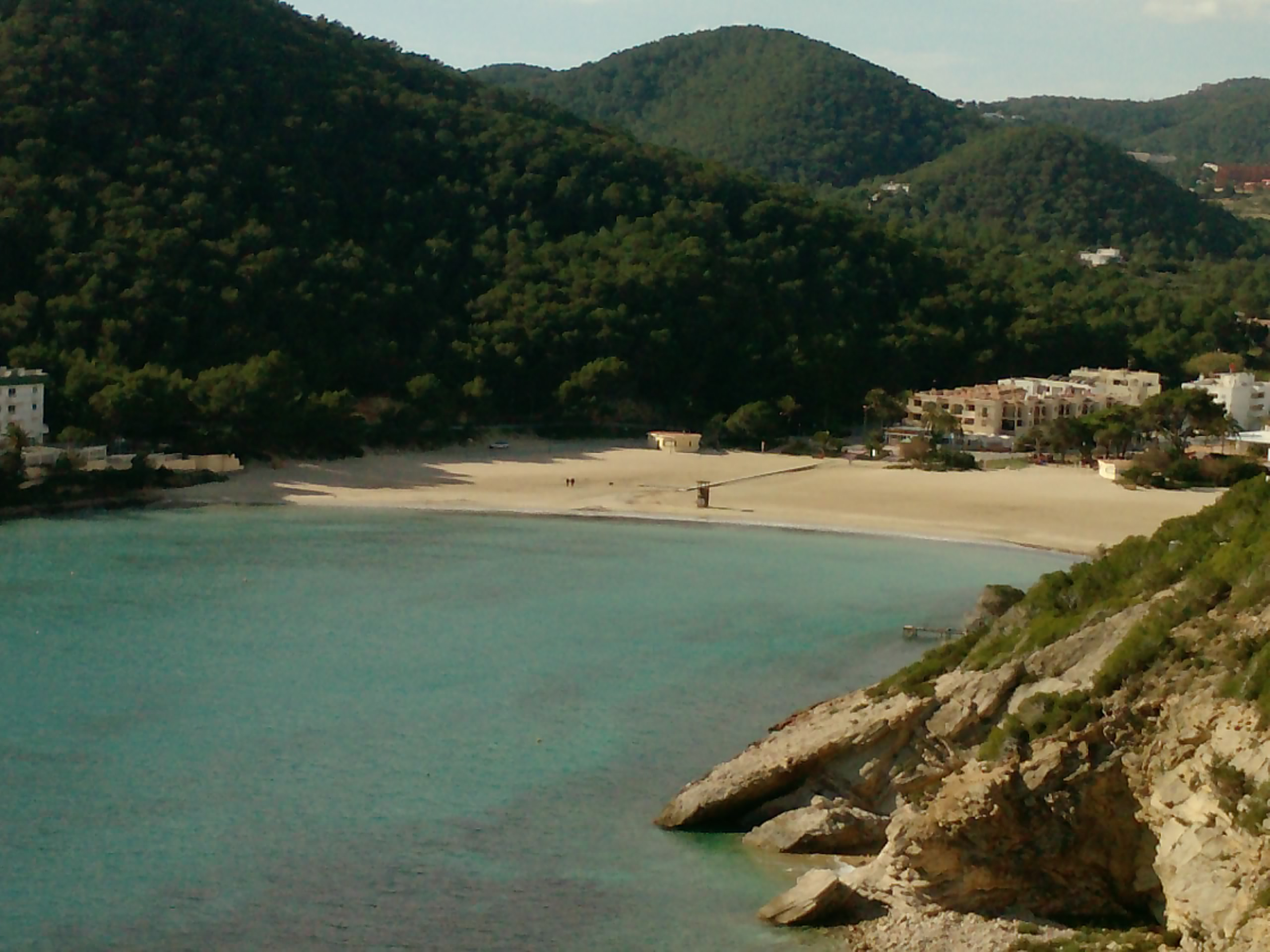
Cala Llonga

Cala Llonga is a settlement and beach resort on the island of Ibiza, in the Balearic Islands, Spain, in the municipality of Santa Eulalia del Río. In 2018, its population was 1042. The resort is a popular destination for tourists, and has ferry connexions with Ibiza Town, Es Caná, and Santa Eulalia del Río.
