= Santa Gertrudis de Fruitera =

- Village
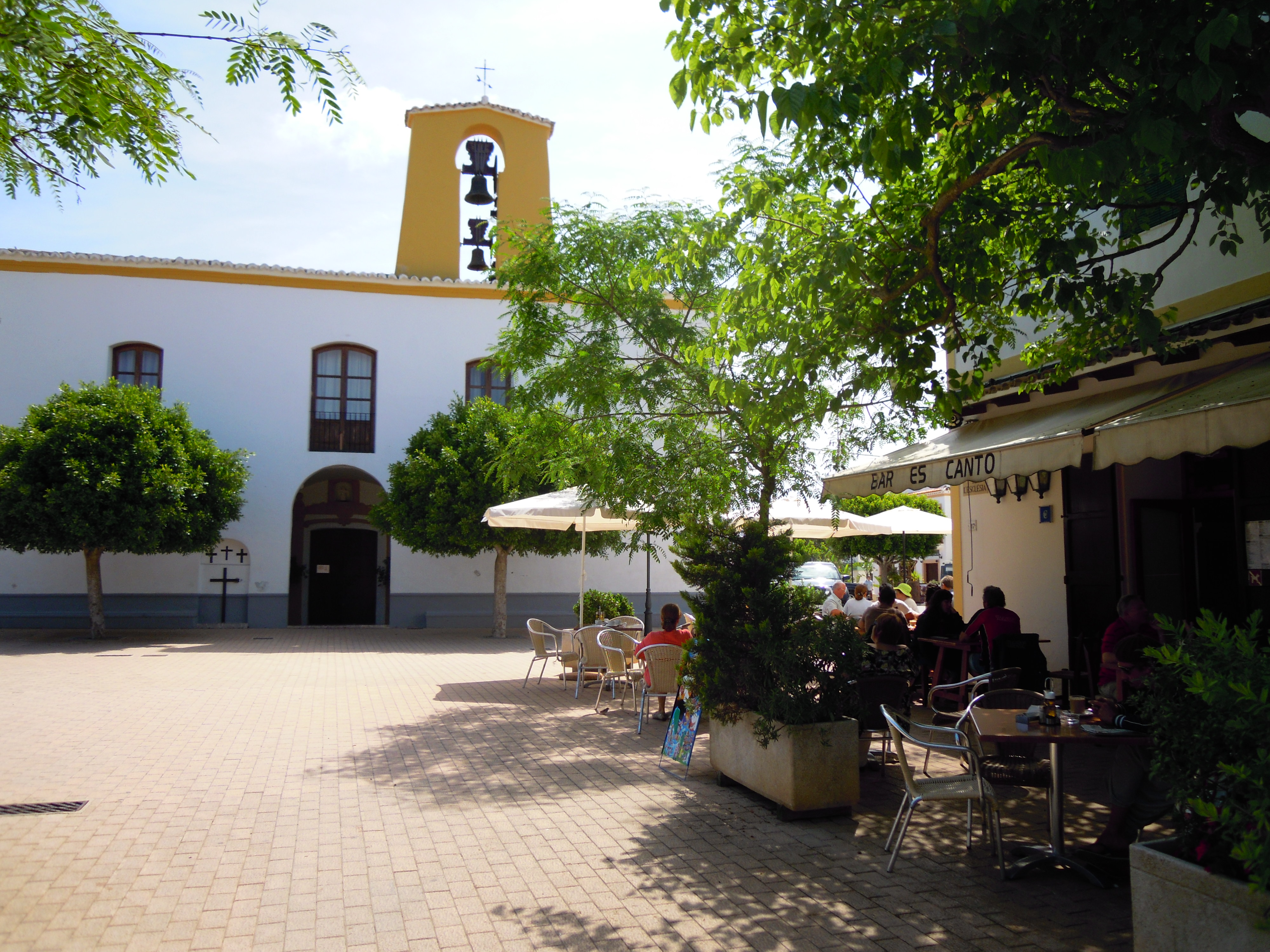

- Location of the village of Santa Gertrudis de Fruitera
- Coordinates: 38°59′52″N 1°25′42″E
- Country: Spain
- Region: Balearic Islands

Population (2006)
  - Total: 1,680
- Time zone: UTC+1 (CET)
  - Summer (DST): UTC+2 (CEST)

Santa Gertrudis de Fruitera is a small village in the central region of the Spanish island of Ibiza.
