= Sant Carles de Peralta =

Sant Carles de Peralta Sant Carles de Peralta
- Village
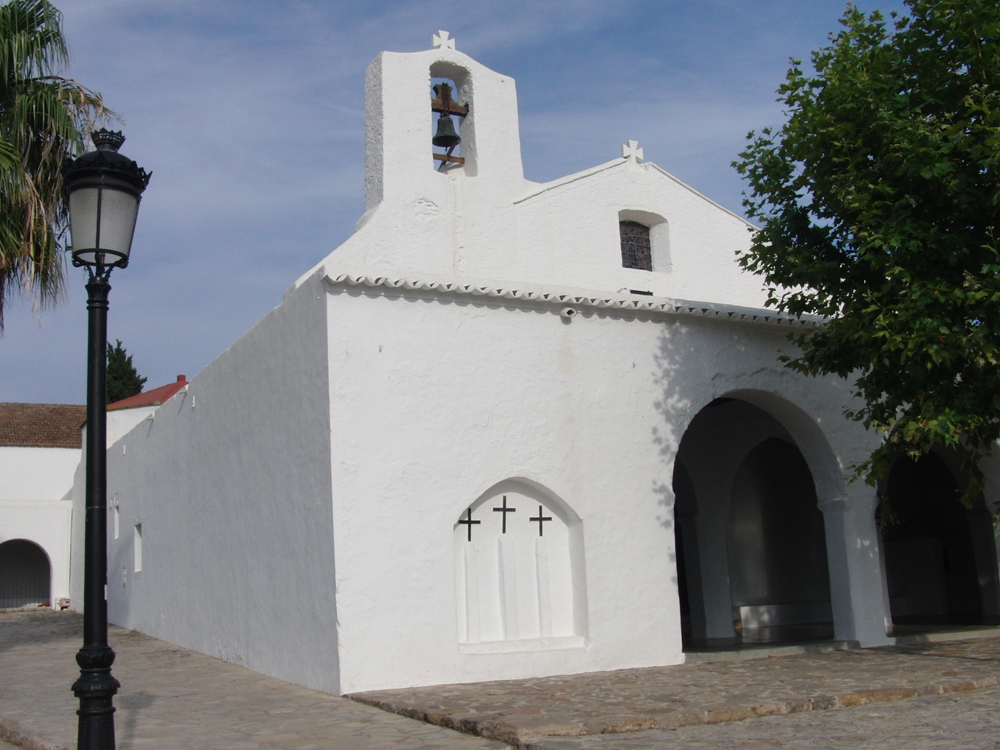
- Church of Sant Carles

- Location of the village of Sant Carles de Peraltina
- Coordinates: 39°2′3″N 1°33′53″E
- Country: Spain
- Region: Balearic Islands

Population (2006)
  - Total: 3,195
- Time zone: UTC+1 (CET)
  - Summer (DST): UTC+2 (CEST)

Sant Carles de Peralta (Spanish: San Carlos) is a village in the north east of Ibiza (Catalan: Eivissa), Spain. The village is in the municipality of Santa Eulària des Riu and is located on the designated road EI-200. The village is 21.6 miles (34.8 km) North East of Ibiza Town and 28.3 miles (45.5 km) of Ibiza Airport. 5.0 kilometres (3.1 mi) to the South east of the village is the coastal resort of Es Canar.

== Locations ==
To the south of the village are chimneys and ruined buildings, the remains of lead mines first exploited by the Carthaginians. The Church of Sant Carles is noted to have an arcaded entrance. Next to it is the famous and historic Bar Anita, the original gathering place for hippies in the 1960s.
