= Santa Eulària des Riu (municipality) =

- Municipality
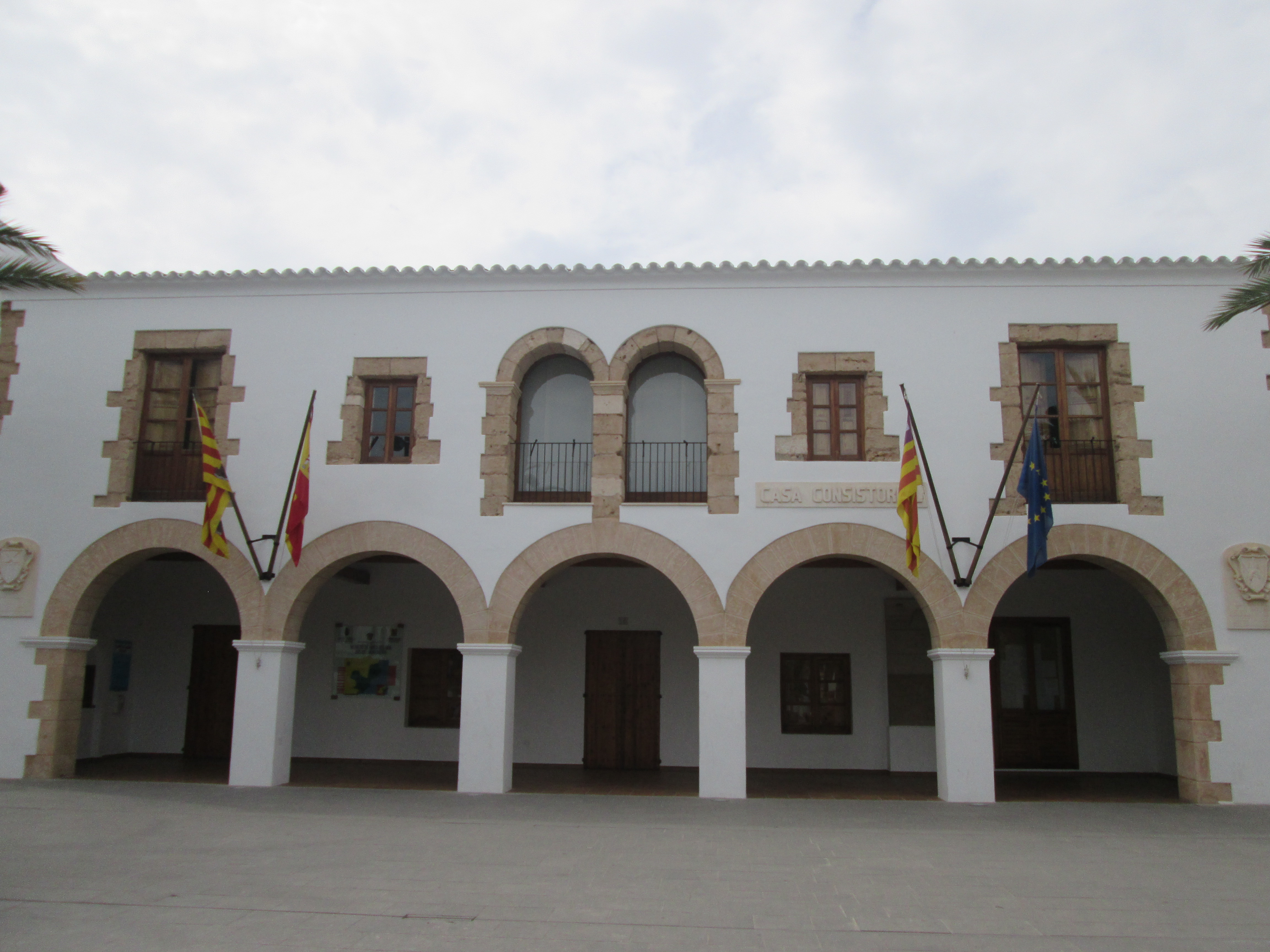
- The Ajuntament (Town Hall) of Santa Eulària des Riu

- Coat of arms

- Municipal location
- Coordinates: 38°59′5″N 1°32′0.1″E
- Country: Spain
- Region: Balearic Islands

Government
  - Mayor: Carmen Ferrer Torres (PP)

Population (2010)
  - Total: 32,637
- Time zone: UTC+1 (CET)
  - Summer (DST): UTC+2 (CEST)

Santa Eulària des Riu (Balearic Catalan pronunciation: [ˈsant(ə) əwˈlaɾiə ðəz ˈriw], Spanish: Santa Eulalia del Río) is a municipality on the eastern coast of Ibiza. The total number of inhabitants in the municipality (2010) is 32,637.

== Local Government ==
The current mayor of Santa Eulària des Riu is Carmen Ferrer Tur (Partit Popular (Espanya)) (2023)

== Parishes (Villages) ==
Santa Eulària des Riu is divided into 5 villages. (Parishes, locally)

Town/village	Population (2006)
Es Canar	1.680
Jesús	4,499
Puig d'en Valls	3,613
Sant Carles de Peralta	3,195
Santa Eulària des Riu	13,737
Santa Gertrudis de Fruitera	1,680
