= Es Canar =

Village in Santa Eulària des Riu, Ibiza, Spain

Platja Es Canar
- Beach
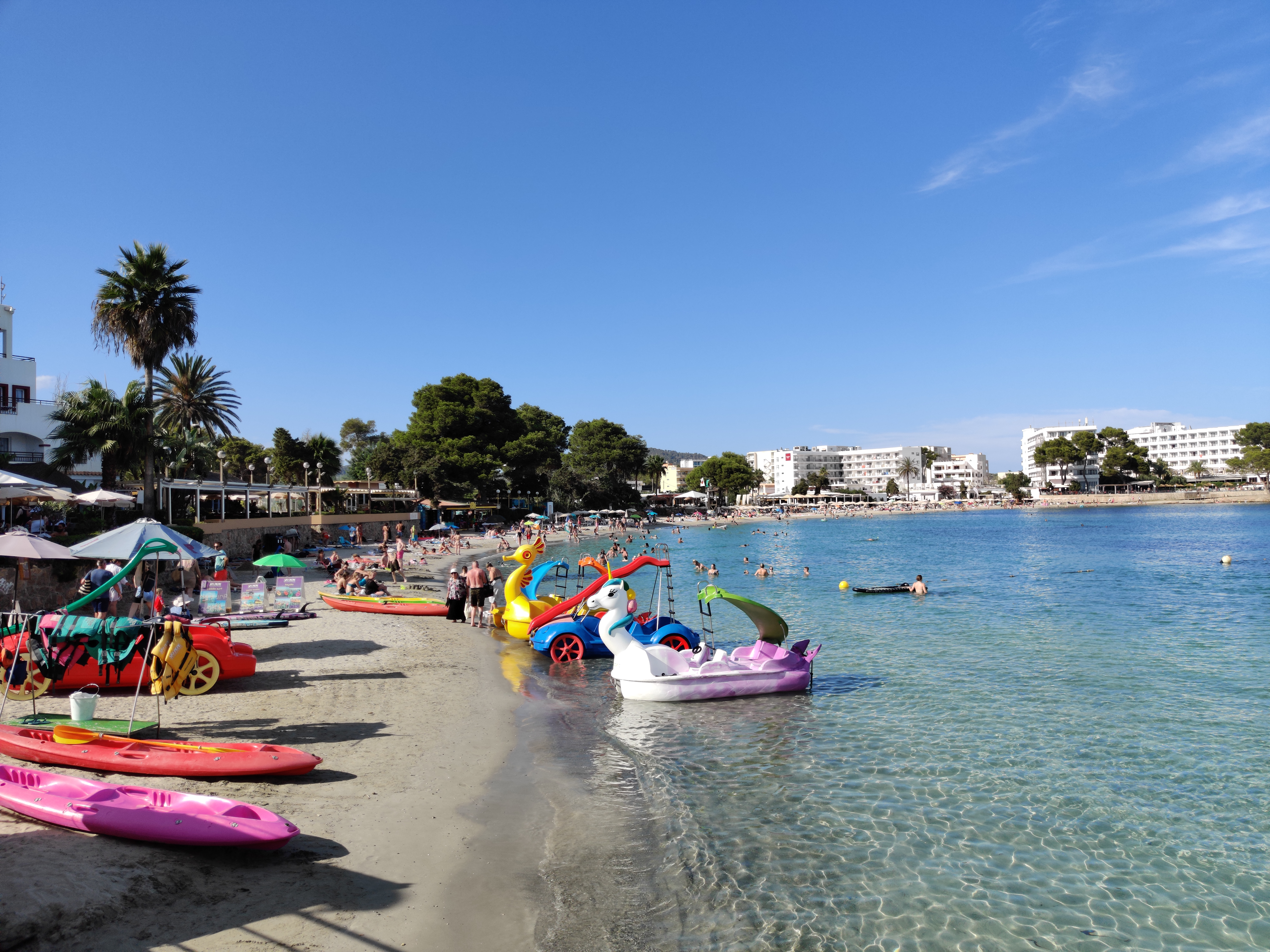
- Platja Es Canar

- Location of Platja des Es Canar on Ibiza
- Coordinates: 39°0′7″N 1°34′41″E
- Location: Santa Eulària des Riu, Ibiza, Spain

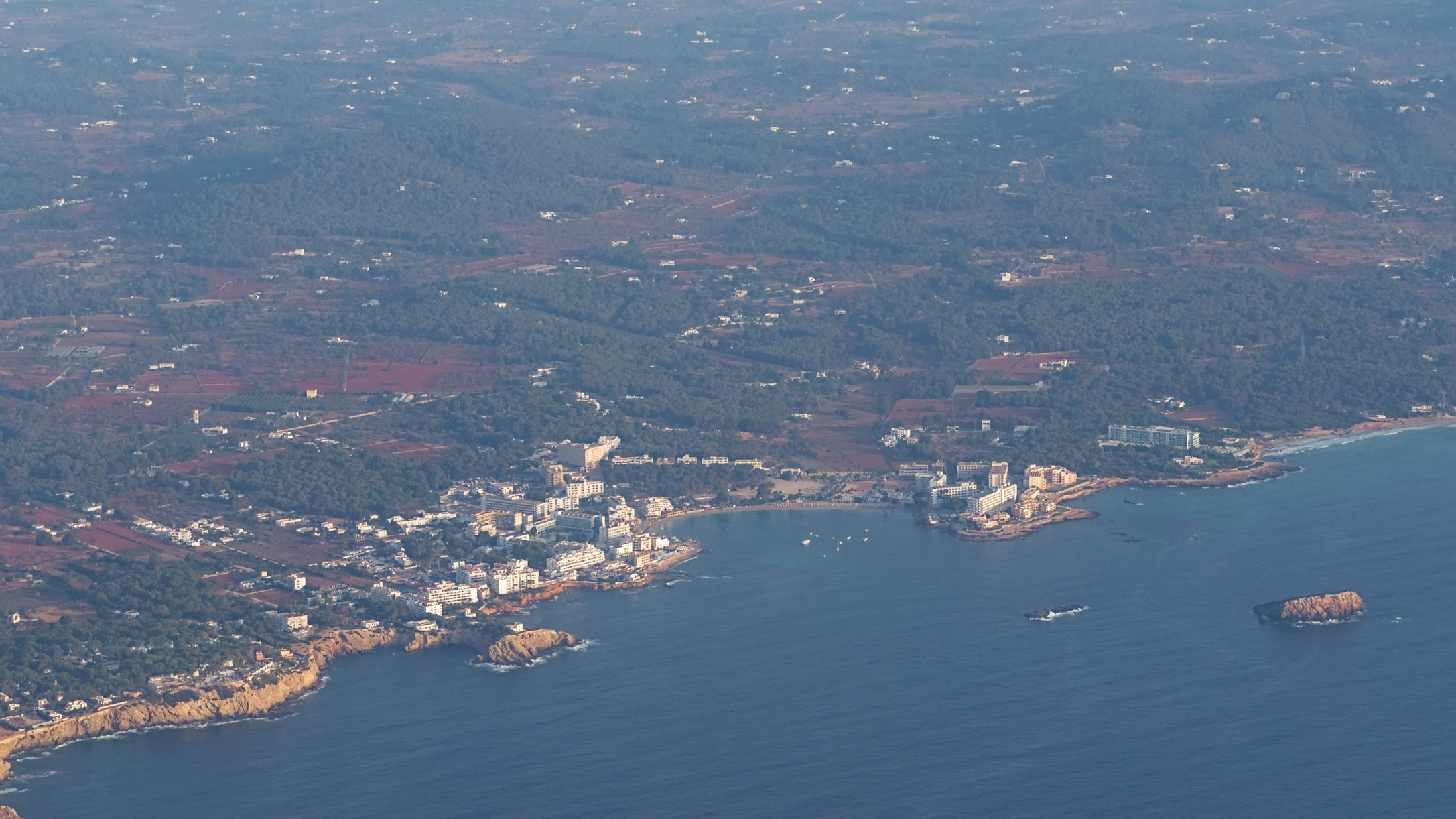
Es Canar from an aeroplane, August 2024

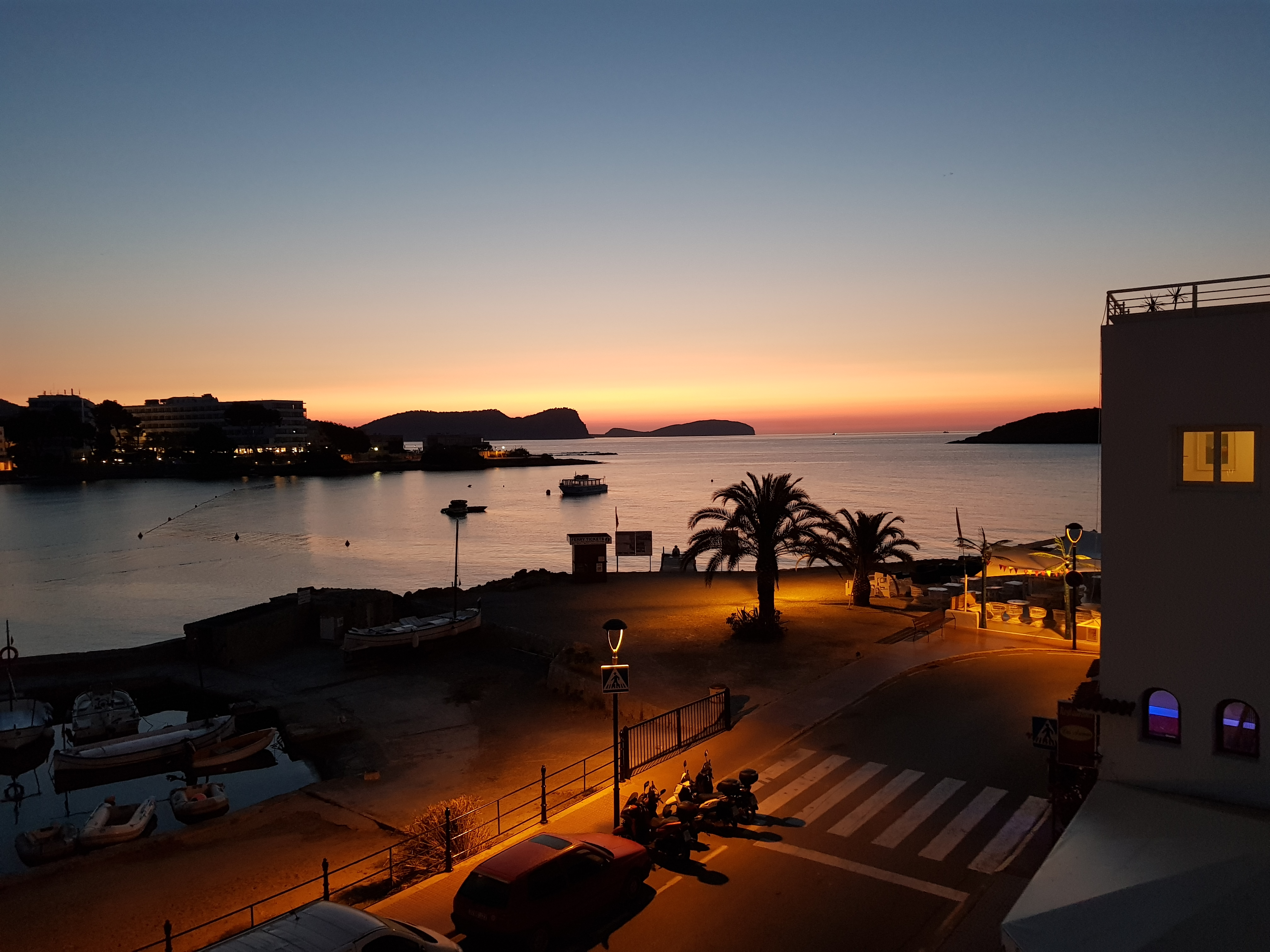
Es Canar Sunrise, June 2018

Es Canar (Spanish: Es Caná) is a beach resort village on the Spanish island of Ibiza. The resort is in the municipality of Santa Eulària des Riu. The resort is reached along the street called Cami d'Escana from Santa Eulària des Riu. The resort is 12.4 miles (20.0 km) north east of Ibiza Town and 16.9 miles (27.2 km) of Ibiza Airport. The resort is 3.4 miles (5.5 km) along the coast, east of Santa Eulària des Riu. The journey time from the airport is approximately 40 minutes by taxi or tourist bus.

== The resort ==
Es Canar is situated on the north eastern seaboard of the islands and as a consequence boasts a reputable sunrise, in contrast to the beautiful sunset found at San Antonio on the island's western side. The resort is compact and consists of mainly four and five storey hotels blocks with many restaurants and bars. The resort is heavily used by tourists during the summer months, and targeted at families. Within the resort there are several white sandy beaches. Also within the resort there is a bus station and pharmacy. From the bus station you are able to access the island other main resorts such as Santa Eulària des Riu, Ibiza Town, San Antoni and Portinatx with buses leaving for these destinations every 20 minutes. There are also many shops throughout the resort, selling branded merchandise, as well as other smaller stores selling authentic Ibizan items. At the southern end of the beach is a small harbour where you can catch a ferry to Santa Eulària des Riu, Ibiza Town, Formentera or one of the many small resorts on the south east coast of the island.

== Environment ==
To the south of the resort is the wooded promontory of Punta Arabí, whilst west inland is a well watered plain. Just offshore from the beach there are the small islands sa Galera and Illa des Canar. In 2003 the beach at Es Canar was awarded a Blue Flag.

== Fiestas ==
Every July the Spanish celebration of Saint Christopher happens in this resort, usually in the first week of July whereby a carnival procession passes through the resort, en route to Santa Eulària with the event culminating in an impressive fireworks display.

== Hippy market ==
Every Wednesday, the Hippy Market takes place at Punta Arabí south of the resorts main center. In the 1960s during the hippy era, many Hippies settled on the Ibiza and began to eke out a living by making trinkets and gifts out of wood, metals and steels, thus the tradition of the markets on the island began, and are still going strong today.

== Language ==
Eivissenc is the native dialect of Catalan that is spoken throughout all Ibizan towns and nearby Formentera, though Catalan also shares co-official status with Spanish." Additionally, because of the influence of tourism and expatriates living in or maintaining residences on the island, other languages like English, German and Italian, are also spoken. Polylinguality is the norm, not the exception.

== Climate ==
Climate data for Eivissa
Month	Jan	Feb	Mar	Apr	May	Jun	Jul	Aug	Sep	Oct	Nov	Dec	Year
Mean daily maximum °C (°F)	15.5 (59.9)	16.0 (60.8)	17.2 (63.0)	19.0 (66.2)	22.2 (72.0)	26.1 (79.0)	29.3 (84.7)	30.0 (86.0)	27.6 (81.7)	23.4 (74.1)	19.3 (66.7)	16.7 (62.1)	21.9 (71.4)
Daily mean °C (°F)	11.8 (53.2)	12.2 (54.0)	13.2 (55.8)	15.0 (59.0)	18.2 (64.8)	22.0 (71.6)	25.0 (77.0)	25.9 (78.6)	23.6 (74.5)	19.6 (67.3)	15.6 (60.1)	13.1 (55.6)	17.9 (64.2)
Mean daily minimum °C (°F)	8.1 (46.6)	8.4 (47.1)	9.3 (48.7)	10.9 (51.6)	14.2 (57.6)	17.8 (64.0)	20.7 (69.3)	21.8 (71.2)	19.5 (67.1)	15.9 (60.6)	12.0 (53.6)	9.6 (49.3)	14.0 (57.2)
Average precipitation mm (inches)	38 (1.5)	33 (1.3)	36 (1.4)	33 (1.3)	26 (1.0)	14 (0.6)	6 (0.2)	19 (0.7)	48 (1.9)	69 (2.7)	51 (2.0)	54 (2.1)	439 (17.3)
Average precipitation days (≥ 1 mm)	5	5	4	4	3	2	1	2	4	6	5	5	46
Mean monthly sunshine hours	161	167	207	243	277	297	335	302	237	198	164	148	2,732
Source: Agencia Estatal de Meteorología

== See also ==
- Platja Es Canar (The Beach)
