= First government of Francesc Antich =

1st government of Francesc Antich
- 6th Government of the Balearic Islands
- 1999–2003
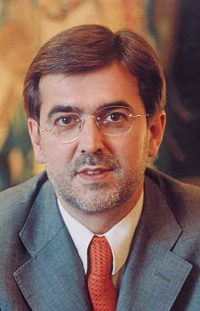
- The president Francesc Antich.
- Date formed: 28 July 1999
- Date dissolved: 1 July 2003

People and organisations
- Monarch: Juan Carlos I
- President: Francesc Antich
- Vice President: Pere Sampol
- No. of ministers: 13 (Note: Does not include the President.)
- Member parties: PSIB–PSOE; PSM; EU; EV
- Status in legislature: Minority coalition government
- Opposition party: PP
- Opposition leader: Jaume Matas (1999–2000; 2003); José María González Ortea (2000–2002); Joan Flaquer (2002–2003)

History
- Election: 1999 regional election
- Outgoing election: 2003 regional election
- Legislature term: 5th Parliament
- Budget: 2000, 2001, 2002, 2003
- Predecessor: Matas I
- Successor: Matas II

The first government of Francesc Antich was formed on 28 July 1999, following the latter's election as President of the Balearic Islands by the Parliament of the Balearic Islands on 23 July, as a result of the pact between centre and left-of-centre parties led by the Socialist Party of the Balearic Islands (PSIB-PSOE) after the 1999 regional election. It succeeded the first Matas government and was the Government of the Balearic Islands from 28 July 1999 to 1 July 2003, a total of 1,434 days, or 3 years, 11 months and 3 days.

== Investiture ==
Investiture; Francesc Antich (PSIB)
Ballot →	23 July 1999
Required majority →	30 out of 59
Yes: • PSIB (16); • PSM–EN (5); • EU–EV (4); • UM (3); • Independent (2); • COP (1)	31 / 59
No: • PP (28)	28 / 59
Abstentions	0 / 59
Absentees	0 / 59

== Council of Government ==
← Antich I Government → (28 July 1999 – 1 July 2003)
Portfolio	Name	Party	Took office	Left office	Ref.
President	Francesc Antich	PSIB–PSOE	27 July 1999	27 June 2003	
Vice President	Pere Sampol	PSM	28 July 1999	17 March 2000	
Minister of the Presidency (Note: Also acting as Spokesperson of the Government, although not officially recognised.)	Antoni Garcías	PSIB–PSOE	28 July 1999	1 July 2003	
Minister of Finance, Budgets, Energy and Techonogical Innovation	Joan Mesquida	PSIB–PSOE	28 July 1999	17 March 2000	
Minister of Labour and Social Welfare	Eberhard Grosske	EU	28 July 1999	17 March 2000	
Minister of Public Works, Housing and Transports	Josep Antoni Ferrer	PSIB–PSOE	28 July 1999	28 September 2001	
Minister of Tourism	Celestí Alomar	PSIB–PSOE	28 July 1999	1 July 2003	
Minister of Education and Culture	Damià Pons	PSM	28 July 1999	1 July 2003	
Minister of Health and Consumer Affairs	Aina Salom	PSIB–PSOE	28 July 1999	1 July 2003	
Minister of Environment	Margalida Rosselló	EV	28 July 1999	1 July 2003	
Minister of Economy, Agriculture, Trade and Industry	Joan Mayol	PSM	28 July 1999	17 March 2000	
Minister of Interior	Josep Maria Costa	PSIB–PSOE	28 July 1999	1 July 2003	
Minister without portfolio	Fernanda Caro	EU	28 July 1999	17 March 2000	
Minister without portfolio	Misericòrdia Ramon	PSIB–PSOE	28 July 1999	17 March 2000	
=== Changes March 2000 ===
Portfolio	Name	Party	Took office	Left office	Ref.
Vice President; Minister of Economy, Trade and Industry (Note: On 17 March 2000, the Ministry of Finance, Budgets, Energy and Techonogical Innovation was disestablished and its competences transferred to the Finance and Budgets and Innovation and Energy departments. Concurrently, the Ministry of Labour and Social Welfare was disestablished and its competences transferred to the ministries of Labour and Training and Social Welfare. Concurrently, the Ministry of Economy, Agriculture, Trade and Industry was disestablished and its competences transferred to the ministries of Economy, Trade and Industry and Agriculture and Fisheries.)	Pere Sampol	PSM	17 March 2000	1 July 2003	
Minister of Finance and Budgets	Joan Mesquida	PSIB–PSOE	17 March 2000	1 July 2003	
Minister of Labour and Training	Eberhard Grosske	EU	17 March 2000	24 October 2002	
Minister of Agriculture and Fisheries	Joan Mayol	PSM	17 March 2000	1 June 2000	
Minister of Social Welfare	Fernanda Caro	EU	17 March 2000	1 July 2003	
Minister of Innovation and Energy	Misericòrdia Ramon	PSIB–PSOE	17 March 2000	17 February 2001	
=== Changes June 2000 ===
Portfolio	Name	Party	Took office	Left office	Ref.
Minister of Agriculture and Fisheries	Mateu Morro	PSM	1 June 2000	1 July 2003	
=== Changes February 2001 ===
Portfolio	Name	Party	Took office	Left office	Ref.
Minister of Innovation and Energy	Príam Villalonga	PSIB–PSOE	17 February 2001	1 July 2003	
=== Changes September 2001 ===
Portfolio	Name	Party	Took office	Left office	Ref.
Minister of Public Works, Housing and Transports	Francesc Quetglas	PSIB–PSOE	28 September 2001	1 July 2003	
=== Changes October 2002 ===
Portfolio	Name	Party	Took office	Left office	Ref.
Minister of Labour and Training	Miquel Rosselló	EU	24 October 2002	1 July 2003	

== Notes ==
Preceded by Matas I	Government of the Balearic Islands; 2007–2011	Succeeded by Matas II
