= Second government of Francesc Antich =

2nd government of Francesc Antich
- 8th Government of the Balearic Islands
- 2007–2011
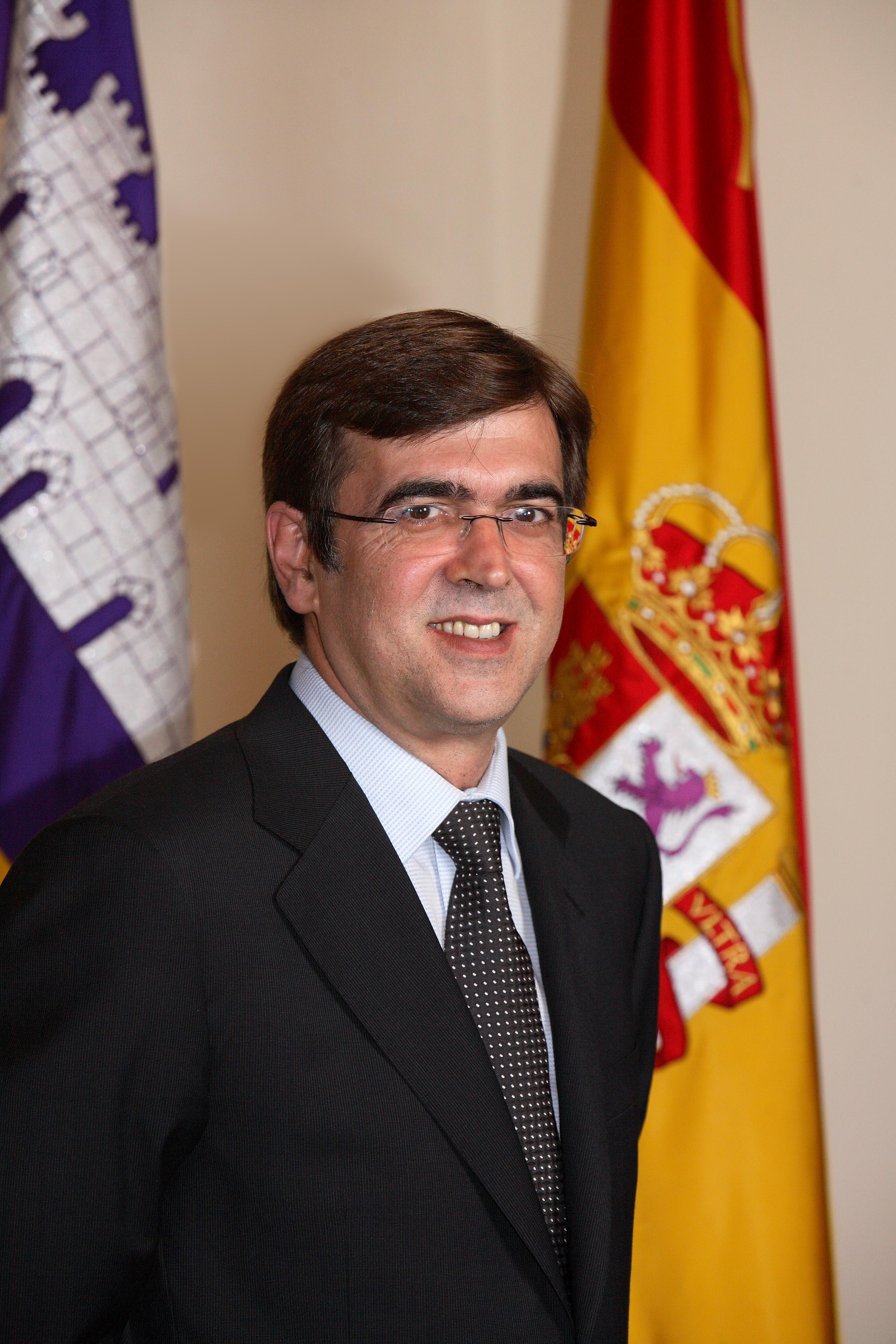
- The president Francesc Antich.
- Date formed: 9 July 2007
- Date dissolved: 20 June 2011

People and organisations
- Monarch: Juan Carlos I
- President: Francesc Antich
- No. of ministers: 14 (Note: Does not include the President.) (2007–2010); 12 (2010); 10 (2010–2011)
- Total no. of members: 20
- Member parties: PSIB–PSOE; PSM; IV (2010–2011); EUIB (2007–2010); UM (2007–2010); ERC (Note: Sub-ministry level.) (2007–2009)
- Status in legislature: Majority coalition government (2007–2010); Minority coalition government (2010–2011)
- Opposition party: PP
- Opposition leader: Rosa Estaràs (2007–2009); José Ramón Bauzá (2009–2011)

History
- Election: 2007 regional election
- Outgoing election: 2011 regional election
- Legislature term: 7th Parliament
- Budget: 2008, 2009, 2010
- Predecessor: Matas II
- Successor: Bauzá

The second government of Francesc Antich was formed on 9 July 2007, following the latter's election as President of the Balearic Islands by the Parliament of the Balearic Islands on 4 July, as a result of the pact between centre and left-of-centre parties led by the Socialist Party of the Balearic Islands (PSIB-PSOE) after the 2007 regional election. It succeeded the second Matas government and was the Government of the Balearic Islands from 9 July 2007 to 20 June 2011, a total of 1,442 days, or 3 years, 11 months and 11 days.

== Investiture ==
Investiture; Francesc Antich (PSIB)
Ballot →	4 July 2007
Required majority →	30 out of 59
Yes: • PSIB (20); • Bloc–PSM–EV (5); • UM (3); • EU (2)	30 / 59
No: • PP (28); • AIPF (1)	29 / 59
Abstentions	0 / 59
Absentees	0 / 59

== Council of Government ==
The Government of the Balearic Islands was structured into the offices for the president, 14 ministries and the post of the spokesperson of the Government. The number of ministries was reduced to 12 after the ministries of Mobility and Sports were merged into the Environment and Presidency departments in February 2010, and to 10 after the ministries of Labour and Agriculture were merged into the Tourism and Presidency departments in June 2010.

← Antich II Government → (9 July 2007 – 20 June 2011)
Portfolio	Name	Party	Took office	Left office	Ref.
President	Francesc Antich	PSIB–PSOE	6 July 2007	18 June 2011	
Minister of the Presidency	Albert Moragues	PSIB–PSOE	9 July 2007	20 June 2011	
Minister of Economy, Finance and Innovation	Carles Manera	PSIB–PSOE	9 July 2007	15 September 2009	
Minister of Tourism	Francesc Buils	UM	9 July 2007	1 October 2008	
Minister of Mobility and Territory Planning	Biel Vicens	PSM	9 July 2007	8 February 2010	
Minister of Education and Culture	Bàrbara Galmés	PSIB–PSOE	9 July 2007	15 September 2009	
Minister of Health and Consumer Affairs	Vicenç Thomàs	PSIB–PSOE	9 July 2007	20 June 2011	
Minister of Environment	Miquel Àngel Grimalt	UM	9 July 2007	5 February 2010	
Minister of Social Affairs, Development and Immigration	Fina Santiago	EUIB / IV (Note: Joined IV in July 2010.)	9 July 2007	20 June 2011	
Minister of Housing and Public Works	Jaume Carbonero	PSIB–PSOE	9 July 2007	20 June 2011	
Minister of Labour and Training; Spokesperson of the Government	Margarita Nájera	PSIB–PSOE	9 July 2007	17 September 2008	
Minister of Commerce, Industry and Energy	Francesca Vives	PSM	9 July 2007	20 June 2011	
Minister of Agriculture and Fisheries	Mercè Amer	PSIB–PSOE	9 July 2007	5 June 2010	
Minister of Sports and Youth	Mateu Cañellas	UM	9 July 2007	5 February 2010	
Minister of the Interior	María Ángeles Leciñena	PSIB–PSOE	9 July 2007	15 September 2009	
=== Changes September 2008 ===
Portfolio	Name	Party	Took office	Left office	Ref.
Minister of Labour and Training; Spokesperson of the Government	Joana Barceló	PSIB–PSOE	17 September 2008	8 February 2010	
=== Changes October 2008 ===
Portfolio	Name	Party	Took office	Left office	Ref.
Minister of Tourism	Miquel Nadal	UM	1 October 2008	4 December 2009	
=== Changes September 2009 ===
Portfolio	Name	Party	Took office	Left office	Ref.
Minister of Economy and Finance (Note: On 15 September 2008, the Directorate-General of Innovation was separated from the Ministry of Economy and Finance and merged into the Interior department, which was restructured into the Ministry of Innovation, Interior and Justice.)	Carles Manera	PSIB–PSOE	15 September 2009	20 June 2011	
Minister of Education and Culture	Bartomeu Llinàs	PSIB–PSOE	15 September 2009	20 June 2011	
Minister of Innovation, Interior and Justice	Pilar Costa	PSIB–PSOE	15 September 2009	20 June 2011	
=== Changes December 2009 ===
Portfolio	Name	Party	Took office	Left office	Ref.
Minister of Tourism	Miquel Àngel Grimalt served as surrogate from 4 to 10 December 2009.				
Minister of Tourism	Miquel Ferrer	UM	10 December 2009	5 February 2010	
=== Changes February 2010 ===
Portfolio	Name	Party	Took office	Left office	Ref.
Minister of Environment and Mobility (Note: On 8 February 2010, the Ministry of Mobility and Territory Planning was disestablished and its competences transferred to the newly-established Ministry of Environment and Mobility. Concurrently, the Ministry of Sports and Youth was disestablished and its competences transferred to the Presidency (Sports) and Social Affairs, Development and Immigration (Youth) departments.)	Fina Santiago took on the ordinary discharge of duties from 5 to 8 February 2010.				
Minister of Environment and Mobility	Biel Vicens	PSM	8 February 2010	20 June 2011	
~~Minister of Mobility and Territory Planning~~	Disestablished on 8 February 2010.				
Minister of Tourism; Spokesperson of the Government	Biel Vicens took on the ordinary discharge of duties from 5 to 8 February 2010.				
Minister of Tourism; Spokesperson of the Government	Joana Barceló	PSIB–PSOE	8 February 2010	5 June 2010	
Minister of Labour and Training	Pere Aguiló	PSIB–PSOE	8 February 2010	5 June 2010	
~~Minister of Sports and Youth~~	Pilar Costa took on the ordinary discharge of duties from 5 to 8 February 2010.				
~~Minister of Sports and Youth~~	Disestablished on 8 February 2010.				
=== Changes June 2010 ===
Portfolio	Name	Party	Took office	Left office	Ref.
Minister of Tourism and Labour (Note: On 5 June 2010, the Ministry of Labour and Training was disestablished and its competences transferred to the newly-established Ministry of Tourism and Labour. Concurrently, the Ministry of Agriculture and Fisheries was disestablished and its competences transferred to the Presidency department.); Spokesperson of the Government	Joana Barceló	PSIB–PSOE	5 June 2010	20 June 2011	
~~Minister of Labour and Training~~	Disestablished on 5 June 2010.				
~~Minister of Agriculture and Fisheries~~	Disestablished on 5 June 2010.				

== Notes ==
Preceded by Matas II	Government of the Balearic Islands; 2007–2011	Succeeded by Bauzá
