= Second government of Jaume Matas =

2nd Cabinet of the Balearic Islands

2nd government of Jaume Matas
- 7th Government of the Balearic Islands
- 2003–2007
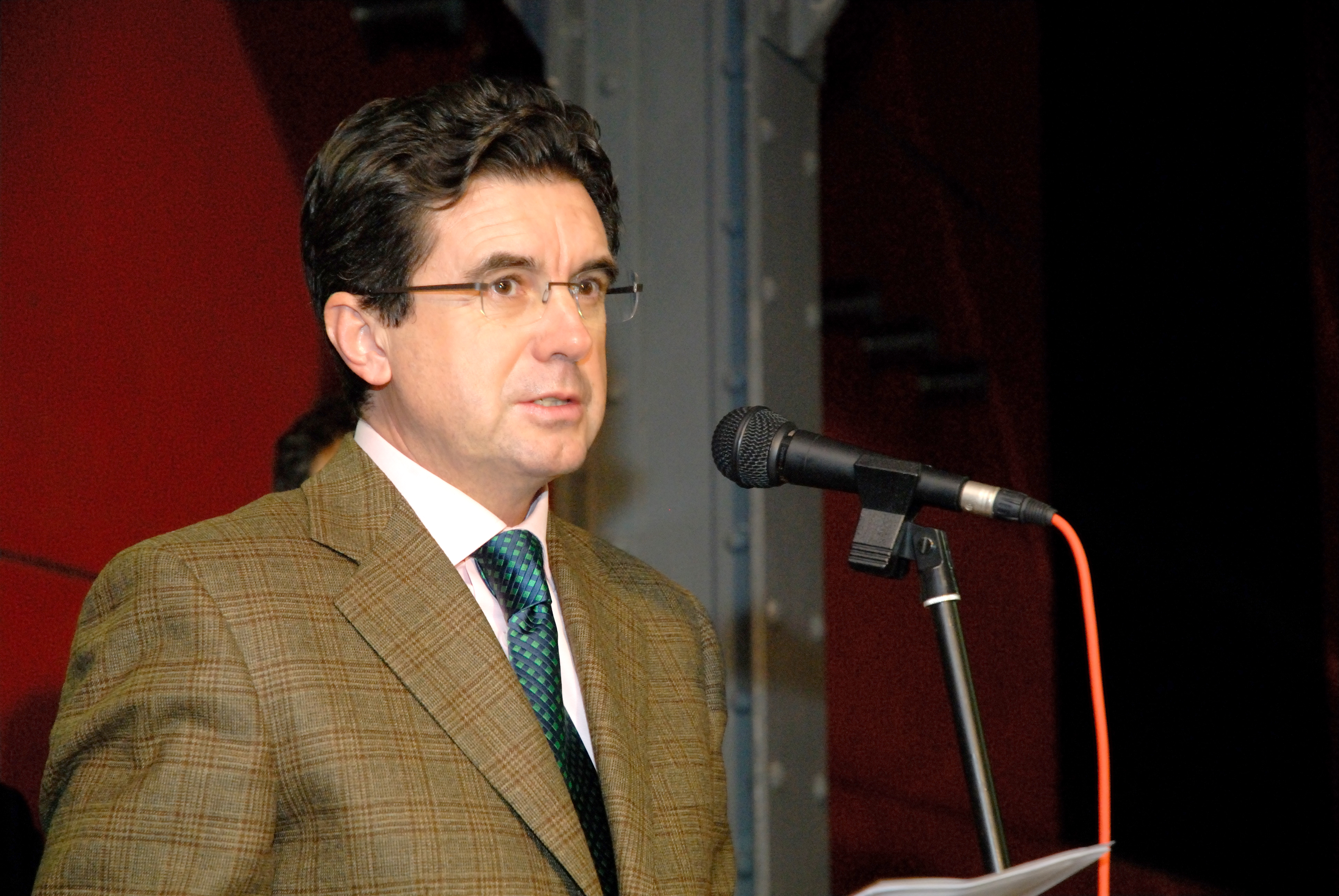
- The president Jaume Matas.
- Date formed: 1 July 2003
- Date dissolved: 9 July 2007

People and organisations
- Monarch: Juan Carlos I
- President: Jaume Matas
- Vice President: Rosa Estaràs
- No. of ministers: 12 (Note: Does not include the President.) (2003–2005); 13 (2005–2007)
- Member parties: PP
- Status in legislature: Majority government
- Opposition party: PSIB–PSOE
- Opposition leader: Francesc Antich

History
- Election: 2003 regional election
- Outgoing election: 2007 regional election
- Legislature term: 6th Parliament
- Budget: 2004, 2005, 2006, 2007
- Predecessor: Antich I
- Successor: Antich II

The second government of Jaume Matas was formed on 1 July 2003, following the latter's election as President of the Balearic Islands by the Parliament of the Balearic Islands on 26 June after the 2003 regional election. It succeeded the first Antich government and was the Government of the Balearic Islands from 1 July 2003 to 9 July 2007, a total of 1,469 days, or 4 years and 8 days.

== Investiture ==
Investiture; Jaume Matas (PP)
Ballot →	26 June 2003
Required majority →	30 out of 59
Yes: • PP (29); • UM (3); • AIPF (1)	33 / 59
No: • PSIB (18); • EU–EV (4); • EN (3)	25 / 59
Abstentions	0 / 59
Absentees: • PSM (1)	1 / 59

== Council of Government ==
The Government of the Balearic Islands was structured into the offices for the president and 12 ministries from 2003 to 2005 and 13 ministries from 2005 to 2007.

← Matas II Government → (1 July 2003 – 9 July 2007)
Portfolio	Name	Party	Took office	Left office	Ref.
President	Jaume Matas	PP	27 June 2003	5 July 2007	
Vice President; Minister of Institutional Relations	Rosa Estaràs	PP	1 July 2003	9 July 2007	
Minister of Tourism; Spokesperson of the Government	Joan Flaquer	PP	1 July 2003	9 July 2007	
Minister of Public Works, Housing and Transport	Mabel Cabrer	PP	1 July 2003	9 July 2007	
Minister of Environment	Jaume Font	PP	1 July 2003	9 July 2007	
Minister of the Interior	José María Rodríguez	PP	1 July 2003	9 July 2007	
Minister of Economy, Finance and Innovation	Lluís Ramis de Ayreflor	PP	1 July 2003	9 July 2007	
Minister of Trade, Industry and Energy	Josep Juan Cardona	PP	1 July 2003	9 July 2007	
Minister of Labour and Training	Guillermo de Olives	PP	1 July 2003	21 May 2004	
Minister of Education and Culture	Francesc Fiol	PP	1 July 2003	9 July 2007	
Minister of Agriculture and Fisheries	Tomàs Cortés	PP	1 July 2003	14 October 2003	
Minister of Health and Consumer Affairs	Aina Castillo	PP	1 July 2003	9 July 2007	
Minister of the Presidency and Sports	Rosa Puig	PP	1 July 2003	9 July 2007	
=== Changes October 2003 ===
Portfolio	Name	Party	Took office	Left office	Ref.
Minister of Agriculture and Fisheries	Margalida Moner	PP	14 October 2003	9 July 2007	
=== Changes May 2004 ===
Portfolio	Name	Party	Took office	Left office	Ref.
Minister of Labour and Training	Cristòfol Huguet	PP	21 May 2004	9 July 2007	
=== Changes October 2005 ===
Portfolio	Name	Party	Took office	Left office	Ref.
Minister of Immigration and Cooperation (Note: Department of new creation.)	Encarna Pastor	PP	19 October 2005	9 July 2007	

== Notes ==
Preceded by Antich I	Government of the Balearic Islands; 2003–2007	Succeeded by Antich II
