= 1999 Balearic regional election =

Election in the Spanish region of the Balearic Islands

- 13 June 1999

All 59 seats in the Parliament of the Balearic Islands 30 seats needed for a majority
- Opinion polls
- Registered: 639,398 ▲7.5%
- Turnout: 367,683 (57.5%) ▼6.1 pp
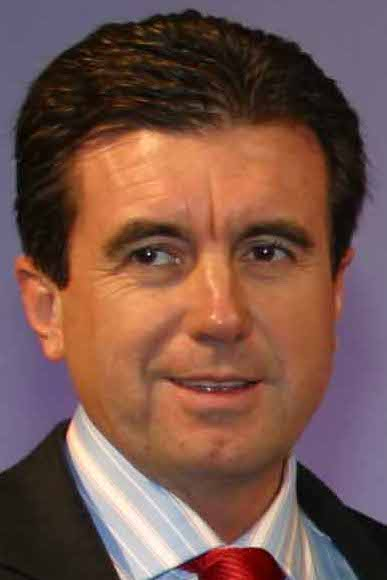

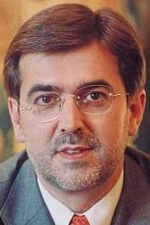

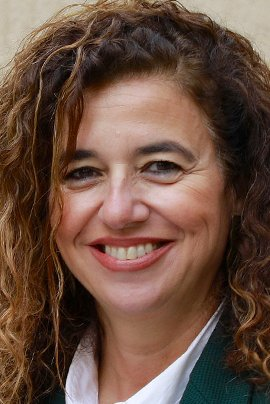

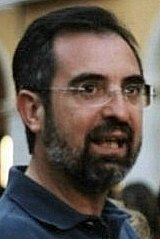

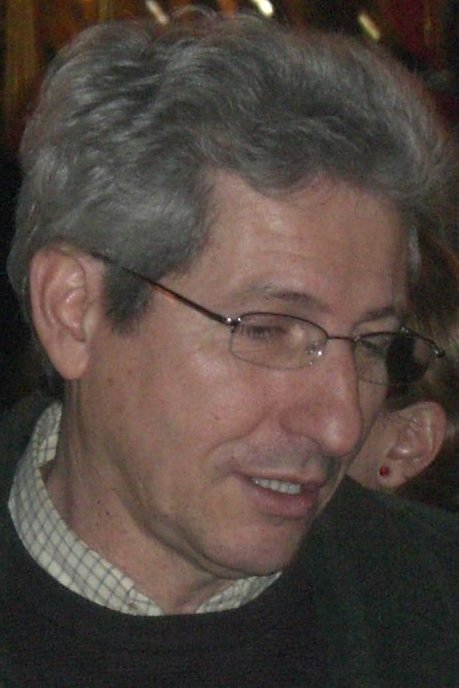
| | First party | Second party | Third party |
|---|---|---|---|
| Leader | Jaume Matas | Francesc Antich | Pilar Costa |
| Party | PP | PSIB–PSOE | Pacte+COP |
| Leader since | 17 June 1996 | 9 November 1998 | 21 March 1999 |
| Leader's seat | Mallorca | Mallorca | Ibiza |
| Last election | 30 seats, 44.8% | 12 seats, 21.3% (Note: Results for PSIB–PSOE in the 1995 election, not including Formentera and Ibiza.) | 5 seats, 4.1% (Note: Results for PSIB–PSOE in Formentera and Ibiza (2.7%, 4 seats), EV in Ibiza (0.6%, 1 seat), IU in Formentera and Ibiza (0.5%, 0 seats), ERC in Ibiza and ENE (0.2%, 0 seats) in the 1995 election.) |
| Seats won | 28 | 13 | 7 |
| Seat change | ▼2 | ▲1 | ▲2 |
| Popular vote | 160,545 | 80,327 | 17,697 |
| Percentage | 44.0% | 22.0% | 4.9% |
| Swing | ▼0.8 pp | ▲0.7 pp | ▲0.8 pp |
| | Fourth party | Fifth party | Sixth party |
| Leader | Pere Sampol | Maria Antònia Munar | Eberhard Grosske |
| Party | PSM–EN | UM | EU–EV |
| Leader since | 1991 | 1 July 1991 | 1991 |
| Leader's seat | Mallorca | Mallorca | Mallorca |
| Last election | 6 seats, 12.0% (Note: Results for PSM–NM (11.0%, 5 seats) and PSM–NI (1.1%, 1 seat) in the 1995 election.) | 2 seats, 5.3% | 3 seats, 8.6% (Note: Results for IU and EVIB in the 1995 election, not including Formentera and Ibiza.) |
| Seats won | 5 | 3 | 3 |
| Seat change | ▼1 | ▲1 | 0 |
| Popular vote | 42,748 | 26,682 | 19,793 |
| Percentage | 11.7% | 7.3% | 5.4% |
| Swing | ▼0.3 pp | ▲2.0 pp | ▼3.2 pp |
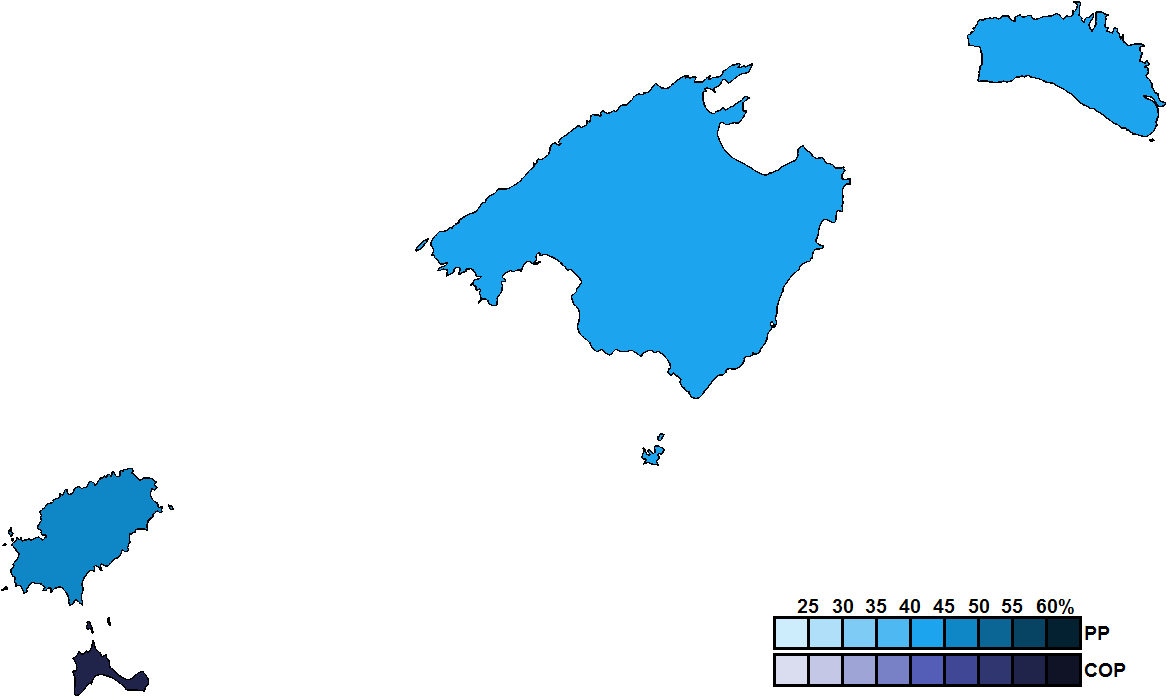
- Constituency results map for the Parliament of the Balearic Islands
President before election
Jaume Matas
PP
President after election
Francesc Antich
PSOE

A regional election was held in the Balearic Islands on 13 June 1999 to elect the 5th Parliament of the autonomous community. All 59 seats in the Parliament were up for election. It was held concurrently with regional elections in twelve other autonomous communities and local elections all across Spain, as well as the 1999 European Parliament election.

The government resulting from the previous election proved unstable after Gabriel Cañellas, the regional president since 1983, was forced to resign—over the Sóller case an alleged illegal financing scheme of the regional People's Party (PP)—one month into his fourth term in July 1995, being replaced in the post by party colleague Cristòfol Soler. However, growing tensions between Soler and Cañellas prompted the former's resignation in May 1996, resulting in the election of Jaume Matas as new president and in an internal crisis within the regional PP.

== Overview ==
Under the 1983 Statute of Autonomy, the Parliament of the Balearic Islands was the unicameral legislature of the homonymous autonomous community, having legislative power in devolved matters, as well as the ability to grant or withdraw confidence from a regional president. The electoral and procedural rules were supplemented by national law provisions.

=== Date ===
The term of the Parliament of the Balearic Islands expired four years after the date of its previous ordinary election, with election day being fixed for the fourth Sunday of May every four years, but a 1998 amendment allowed for regional elections held in May 1995 to be held concurrently with European Parliament elections, provided that they were scheduled for within a four month-timespan. The election decree was required to be issued no later than 54 days before the scheduled election date and published on the following day in the Official Gazette of the Balearic Islands (BOIB). The previous election was held on 28 May 1995, setting the date for election day concurrently with that year's European Parliament election on 13 June 1999.

The Parliament of the Balearic Islands could not be dissolved before the expiration date of parliament, except in the event of an investiture process failing to elect a regional president within a 60-day period from the Parliament's reconvening. In such a case, the chamber was to be automatically dissolved and a snap election called, with elected lawmakers serving the remainder of its original four-year term.

The election to the Parliament of the Balearic Islands was officially called on 20 April 1999 with the publication of the corresponding decree in the BOIB, setting election day for 13 June.

=== Electoral system ===
Voting for the Parliament was based on universal suffrage, comprising all Spanish nationals over 18 years of age, registered in the Balearic Islands and with full political rights, provided that they had not been deprived of the right to vote by a final sentence, nor were legally incapacitated.

The Parliament of the Balearic Islands had 59 seats. All were elected in four multi-member constituencies—corresponding to the islands of Mallorca, Menorca, Ibiza and Formentera, each of which was assigned a fixed number of seats—using the D'Hondt method and closed-list proportional voting, with a five percent-threshold of valid votes (including blank ballots) in each constituency. The use of this electoral method resulted in a higher effective threshold depending on district magnitude and vote distribution.

As a result of the aforementioned allocation, each Parliament constituency was entitled the following seats:

| Seats | Constituencies |
|---|---|
| 33 | Mallorca |
| 13 | Menorca |
| 12 | Ibiza |
| 1 | Formentera |

The law did not provide for by-elections to fill vacant seats; instead, any vacancies arising after the proclamation of candidates and during the legislative term were filled by the next candidates on the party lists or, when required, by designated substitutes.

=== Outgoing parliament ===
The table below shows the composition of the parliamentary groups in the chamber at the time of the election call.

Parliamentary composition in April 1999
| Groups | Parties | Legislators | |
| Groups | Parties | Seats | Total |
|---|---|---|---|
| People's Parliamentary Group | PP | 29 | 30 |
| People's Parliamentary Group | AIPF | 1 | 30 |
| Socialist Parliamentary Group | PSIB–PSOE | 16 | 16 |
| PSM–EN Parliamentary Group | PSM | 5 | 6 |
| PSM–EN Parliamentary Group | PSMe | 1 | 6 |
| United Left–The Greens Parliamentary Group | EUIB | 3 | 3 |
| Mixed Parliamentary Group | UM | 2 | 4 |
| Mixed Parliamentary Group | EV | 1 | 4 |
| Mixed Parliamentary Group | INDEP | 1 (Note: Joana Aina Vidal, former PP legislator.) | 4 |

== Parties and candidates ==
The electoral law allowed for parties and federations registered in the interior ministry, alliances and groupings of electors to present lists of candidates. Parties and federations intending to form an alliance were required to inform the relevant electoral commission within 10 days of the election call, whereas groupings of electors needed to secure the signature of at least one percent of the electorate in the constituencies for which they sought election, disallowing electors from signing for more than one list.

Below is a list of the main parties and alliances which contested the election:

| Candidacy | Parties and alliances | Leading candidate | Ideology | Previous result | | Gov. | Ref. |
| Candidacy | Parties and alliances | Leading candidate | Ideology | Vote % | Seats | Gov. | Ref. |
|---|---|---|---|---|---|---|---|
| PP | List: People's Party (PP) | Jaume Matas | Conservatism; Christian democracy | 44.8% | 30 | Yes | |
| PSIB–PSOE | List: Socialist Party of the Balearic Islands (PSIB–PSOE) | Francesc Antich | Social democracy | 21.3% | 12 | No | |
| PSM–EN | List: Socialist Party of Mallorca (PSM); Socialist Party of Menorca (PSMe) | Pere Sampol | Left-wing nationalism Democratic socialism Environmentalism | 12.0% | 6 | No | |
| Pacte+COP | List: Socialist Party of the Balearic Islands (PSIB–PSOE) (Note: In Ibiza and Formentera.); United Left of the Balearic Islands (EUIB); Nationalist and Ecologist Agreement (ENE); The Greens (EV); Republican Left of Catalonia (ERC) (Note: In Ibiza.) | Pilar Costa | Progressivism | 4.1% | 5 | No | |
| EU–EV | List: United Left of Mallorca (EU); The Greens of Mallorca (EV); Left of Menorca–United Left (EM–EU) | Eberhard Grosske | Socialism; Communism | 8.6% | 3 | No | |
| UM | List: Majorcan Union (UM) | Maria Antònia Munar | Regionalism; Liberalism | 5.3% | 2 | No | |
| AIPF | List: Independent Popular Council of Formentera (AIPF) | José Mayans Serra | Conservatism | 0.3% | 1 | No | |

== Campaign ==
=== Debates ===
1999 Balearic regional election debates
| Date | Organizer(s) | Moderator(s) | P Present (Note: Denotes a main invitee attending the event.) | | | |
| Date | Organizer(s) | Moderator(s) | PP | PSIB | Audience | Ref. |
|---|---|---|---|---|---|---|
| 7 June | Sa Nostra | Gaspar Sabater | P Matas | P Antich | — | |

== Opinion polls ==
The tables below list opinion polling results in reverse chronological order, showing the most recent first and using the dates when the survey fieldwork was done, as opposed to the date of publication. Where the fieldwork dates are unknown, the date of publication is given instead. The highest percentage figure in each polling survey is displayed with its background shaded in the leading party's colour. If a tie ensues, this is applied to the figures with the highest percentages. The "Lead" column on the right shows the percentage-point difference between the parties with the highest percentages in a poll.

=== Voting intention estimates ===
The table below lists weighted voting intention estimates. Refusals are generally excluded from the party vote percentages, while question wording and the treatment of "don't know" responses and those not intending to vote may vary between polling organisations. When available, seat projections determined by the polling organisations are displayed below (or in place of) the percentages in a smaller font; 30 seats were required for an absolute majority in the Parliament of the Balearic Islands.

| Polling firm/Commissioner | Fieldwork date | Sample size | Turnout | PP | PSIB–PSOE | PSM | EUIB | UM | EVIB | AIPF | Pacte | COP | Lead |
|---|---|---|---|---|---|---|---|---|---|---|---|---|---|
| 1999 regional election | 13 Jun 1999 | —N/a | 57.5 | 44.0; 28 | 22.0; 13 | 11.7; 5 | 5.4; 3 | 7.3; 3 | (Note: Within EUIB.) | 0.3; 0 | 4.4; 6 | 0.4; 1 | 22.0 |
| Eco Consulting/ABC | 24 May–2 Jun 1999 | ? | ? | 40.8; 27/28 | 16.8; 10/11 | 15.1; 8 | 7.7; 3/4 | 7.5; 3 | | 0.3; 0/1 | 5.0; 5/6 | – | 24.0 |
| Demoscopia/El País | 26 May–1 Jun 1999 | ? | 60 | 46.8; 29/30 | 23.6; 14/15 | 9.5; 5 | 6.5; 2 | 5.8; 2 | | (Note: Within PP.) | 4.7; 6 | – | 23.2 |
| CIS | 3–21 May 1999 | 799 | 63.3 | 46.4; 29/30 | 17.7; 11/12 | 14.5; 6/7 | 7.3; 3 | 7.1; 2/3 | | | 4.1; 6 | – | 28.7 |
| Sigma Dos/El Mundo | 14–19 May 1999 | 1,200 | ? | 46.8; 29/31 | 18.5; 11/12 | 12.3; 5/6 | 10.9; 3/4 | 5.0; 1/2 | | | 5.0; 6/7 | – | 28.3 |
| 1996 general election | 3 Mar 1996 | —N/a | 71.6 | 45.1 | 36.0 | 5.7 | 7.7 | 1.6 | 2.2 | – | – | – | 9.1 |
| 1995 regional election | 28 May 1995 | —N/a | 63.6 | 44.8; 30 | 24.0; 16 | 12.2; 6 | 6.6; 3 | 5.3; 2 | 3.1; 1 | 0.3; 1 | – | – | 20.8 |

== Results ==
=== Overall ===
← Summary of the 13 June 1999 Parliament of the Balearic Islands election results →
| Parties and alliances | Popular vote | | | Seats | |
| Parties and alliances | Votes | % | ±pp | Total | +/− |
|---|---|---|---|---|---|
| People's Party (PP) | 160,545 | 44.01 | −0.76 | 28 | −2 |
| Socialist Party of the Balearic Islands (PSIB–PSOE)^{1} | 80,327 | 22.02 | +0.77 | 13 | +1 |
| PSM–Nationalist Agreement (PSM–EN) | 42,748 | 11.72 | −0.33 | 5 | −1 |
| Socialist Party of Mallorca–Nationalist Agreement (PSM–EN) | 39,509 | 10.83 | −0.15 | 4 | −1 |
| Socialist Party of Menorca–Nationalist Agreement (PSM–EN) | 3,239 | 0.89 | −0.18 | 1 | ±0 |
| Majorcan Union (UM) | 26,682 | 7.31 | +1.99 | 3 | +1 |
| United Left–The Greens (EU–EV) | 19,793 | 5.43 | −3.14 | 3 | ±0 |
| United Left of Mallorca–The Greens of Mallorca (EU–EV)^{2} | 17,403 | 4.77 | −3.02 | 2 | ±0 |
| Left of Menorca–United Left (EM–EU)^{3} | 2,390 | 0.66 | −0.12 | 1 | ±0 |
| Progressive Pact+Coalition of Progressive Organizations (Pacte+COP) | 17,697 | 4.85 | +0.77 | 7 | +2 |
| Progressive Pact (Pacte)^{4} | 16,161 | 4.43 | +0.66 | 6 | +1 |
| Coalition of Progressive Organizations (COP)^{5} | 1,536 | 0.42 | +0.11 | 1 | +1 |
| Independent Social Group (ASI) | 2,368 | 0.65 | +0.27 | 0 | ±0 |
| Balearic People's Coalition–Balearic People's Union (CPB–UPB) | 2,219 | 0.61 | New | 0 | ±0 |
| Independent Popular Council of Formentera (AIPF) | 1,183 | 0.32 | ±0.00 | 0 | −1 |
| Republican Left of Catalonia (ERC) | 1,106 | 0.30 | −0.18 | 0 | ±0 |
| Pityusic Civic Union (UCP) | 954 | 0.26 | New | 0 | ±0 |
| Alternative Left of the Balearic Islands (EAIB) | 675 | 0.19 | New | 0 | ±0 |
| The Greens–Green Group (LV–GV) | 643 | 0.18 | New | 0 | ±0 |
| Social Democrats for Progress (SDP) | 641 | 0.18 | New | 0 | ±0 |
| Workers for Democracy Coalition (TD)^{6} | 473 | 0.13 | +0.04 | 0 | ±0 |
| Blank ballots | 6,777 | 1.86 | +0.50 | | |
| Total | 364,831 | | | 59 | ±0 |
| Valid votes | 364,831 | 99.22 | −0.15 | | |
| Invalid votes | 2,852 | 0.78 | +0.15 | | |
| Votes cast / turnout | 367,683 | 57.50 | −6.06 | | |
| Abstentions | 271,715 | 42.50 | +6.06 | | |
| Registered voters | 639,398 | | | | |
Sources
Footnotes: ^{1} Socialist Party of the Balearic Islands does not include results in Ibiza.; ^{2} United Left of Mallorca–The Greens of Mallorca results are compared to the combined totals of United Left of Mallorca and The Greens of the Balearic Islands in Mallorca in the 1995 election.; ^{3} Left of Menorca–United Left results are compared to United Left of Menorca totals in the 1995 election.; ^{4} Progressive Pact results are compared to the combined totals of Socialist Party of the Balearic Islands, The Greens, United Left of Ibiza, Nationalist and Ecologist Agreement and Republican Left of Catalonia in Ibiza in the 1995 election.; ^{5} Coalition of Progressive Organizations results are compared to the combined totals of Socialist Party of the Balearic Islands and United Left in Formentera in the 1995 election.; ^{6} Workers for Democracy Coalition results are compared to Neighbourhood Movement–New Socialist Party totals in the 1995 election.

Popular vote
| PP | 44.01% |
| PSIB–PSOE | 22.02% |
| PSM–EN | 11.72% |
| UM | 7.31% |
| EU–EV | 5.43% |
| Pacte+COP | 4.85% |
| Others | 2.81% |
| Blank ballots | 1.86% |

Seats
| PP | 47.46% |
| PSIB–PSOE | 22.03% |
| Pacte+COP | 11.86% |
| PSM–EN | 8.47% |
| UM | 5.08% |
| EU–EV | 5.08% |

=== Distribution by constituency ===
| Constituency | PP | | PSIB | | PSM–EN | | UM | | EU–EV | | Pacte | | COP | |
| Constituency | % | S | % | S | % | S | % | S | % | S | % | S | % | S |
|---|---|---|---|---|---|---|---|---|---|---|---|---|---|---|
| Formentera | | | | | | | | | | | | | 55.6 | 1 |
| Ibiza | 47.1 | 6 | | | | | | | | | 46.3 | 6 | | |
| Mallorca | 44.5 | 16 | 23.1 | 8 | 13.4 | 4 | 9.1 | 3 | 5.9 | 2 | | | | |
| Menorca | 40.3 | 6 | 37.9 | 5 | 9.8 | 1 | | | 7.3 | 1 | | | | |
| Total | 44.0 | 28 | 22.0 | 13 | 11.7 | 5 | 7.3 | 3 | 5.4 | 3 | 4.4 | 6 | 0.4 | 1 |

== Aftermath ==
=== Government formation ===
Investiture; Nomination of Francesc Antich (PSIB)
| Ballot → | 23 July 1999 |
| Required majority → | 30 out of 59 |
| Yes: • PSIB (16); • PSM–EN (5); • EU–EV (4); • UM (3); • Independent (2); • COP (1) | 31 / 59 |
| No: • PP (28) | 28 / 59 |
| Abstentions | 0 / 59 |
| Absentees | 0 / 59 |

== Bibliography ==
- Ley Orgánica 2/1983, de 25 de febrero, de Estatuto de Autonomía para las islas Baleares (Organic Law 2/1983). Official State Gazette (in Spanish). 1 March 1983. BOE-A-1983-6316.
- Ley 5/1984, de 24 de octubre, de Régimen Jurídico de la Administración de la Comunidad Autónoma de las Islas Baleares (Law 5/1984). Official State Gazette (in Spanish). 24 October 1984. BOE-A-1985-3470.
- Ley Orgánica 5/1985, de 19 de junio, del Régimen Electoral General (Organic Law 5/1985). Official State Gazette (in Spanish). 19 June 1985 [version as of 22 April 1999]. BOE-A-1985-11672.
- Ley 8/1986, de 26 de noviembre, Electoral de la Comunidad Autónoma de las Islas Baleares (Law 8/1986). Official State Gazette (in Spanish). 26 November 1986 [version as of 30 December 1997]. BOE-A-1987-2903.
- Ley Orgánica 3/1999, de 8 de enero, de reforma de la Ley Orgánica 2/1983, de Estatuto de Autonomía de las Illes Balears (Organic Law 3/1999). Official State Gazette (in Spanish). 8 January 1999. BOE-A-1999-458.
- Decreto 41/1999 de 19 de abril de convocatoria de elecciones al Parlamento de las Illes Balear (PDF) (Decree 41/1999). Official Gazette of the Balearic Islands (in Spanish). 19 April 1999.
