= President of the Government of the Balearic Islands =

President of the Balearic Islands
- President/Presidenta del Govern de les Illes Balears
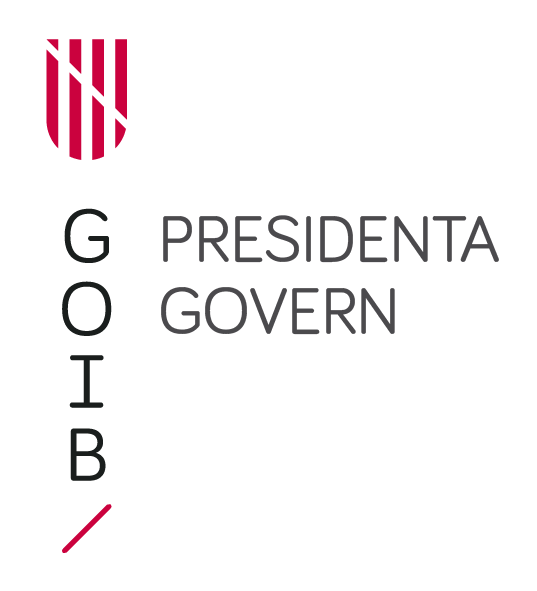

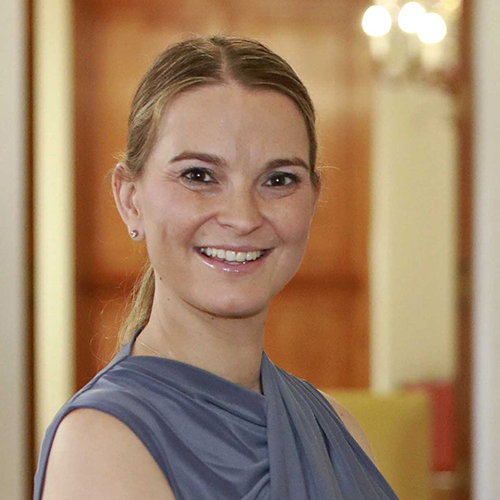
- Incumbent; Marga Prohens since 7 July 2023
- Style: Molt Honorable Senyor/a
- Residence: Consulate of the Sea, Palma, Mallorca
- Nominator: Parliament of the Balearic Islands
- Appointer: The Monarch countersigned by the Prime Minister
- Term length: 4 years
- Inaugural holder: Gabriel Cañellas; 8 June 1983

The president of the Balearic Islands is the head of government of the Balearic Islands, one of the 17 autonomous communities of Spain, while the monarch Felipe VI remains the head of state as King of Spain (and therefore of the Balearic Islands).

== List of officeholders ==
Governments:

- Mixed coalition
- AP–PDL–UL
- PP

| Portrait | Name (Birth–Death) | Term of office | | | Party | Government Composition | Election | Monarch (Reign) | Ref. |
| Portrait | Name (Birth–Death) | Took office | Left office | Duration | Party | Government Composition | Election | Monarch (Reign) | Ref. |
|---|---|---|---|---|---|---|---|---|---|
| | Jeroni Albertí (1927–2024) | 30 July 1977 | 24 July 1978 | 5 years and 59 days | UCD | Albertí I UCD–PSOE–AP | N/A | King; Juan Carlos I (1975–2014) | |
| | Jeroni Albertí (1927–2024) | 24 July 1978 | 4 May 1979 | 5 years and 59 days | UCD | Albertí II; UCD–PSOE–AP | N/A | King; Juan Carlos I (1975–2014) | |
| | Jeroni Albertí (1927–2024) | 4 May 1979 | 27 September 1982 | 5 years and 59 days | UCD | Albertí III; UCD–PSOE–AP–PCIB–PSM–PSMe | N/A | King; Juan Carlos I (1975–2014) | |
| During this interval, Vice President Francesc Tutzó served as acting officeholder. | | | | | | Albertí III; UCD–PSOE–AP–PCIB–PSM–PSMe | N/A | King; Juan Carlos I (1975–2014) | |
| | Francesc Tutzó (born 1940) | 22 November 1982 | 9 June 1983 | 199 days | UCD / Indep. | Tutzó; UCD–PSOE–AP–PCIB–PSM–PSMe | N/A | King; Juan Carlos I (1975–2014) | |
| | Gabriel Cañellas (born 1941) | 9 June 1983 | 22 July 1987 | 12 years and 53 days | AP | Cañellas I AP–PDP–UL | 1983 | King; Juan Carlos I (1975–2014) | |
| | Gabriel Cañellas (born 1941) | 22 July 1987 | 1 July 1991 | 12 years and 53 days | AP | Cañellas II; AP–PL/PP–UM | 1987 | King; Juan Carlos I (1975–2014) | |
| | Gabriel Cañellas (born 1941) | 22 July 1987 | 1 July 1991 | 12 years and 53 days | PP | Cañellas II; AP–PL/PP–UM | 1987 | King; Juan Carlos I (1975–2014) | |
| | Gabriel Cañellas (born 1941) | 1 July 1991 | 1 July 1995 | 12 years and 53 days | PP | Cañellas III; PP–UM | 1991 | King; Juan Carlos I (1975–2014) | |
| | Gabriel Cañellas (born 1941) | 1 July 1995 | 1 August 1995 | 12 years and 53 days | PP | Cañellas IV; PP | 1995 | King; Juan Carlos I (1975–2014) | |
| | Cristòfol Soler (born 1956) | 1 August 1995 | 18 June 1996 | 322 days | PP | Cañellas IV; PP | 1995 | King; Juan Carlos I (1975–2014) | |
| | Jaume Matas (born 1956) | 18 June 1996 | 27 July 1999 | 3 years and 39 days | PP | Matas I PP | 1995 | King; Juan Carlos I (1975–2014) | |
| | Francesc Antich (1958–2025) | 27 July 1999 | 27 June 2003 | 3 years and 335 days | PSIB–PSOE | Antich I PSOE–PSM–EN–EU–EV | 1999 | King; Juan Carlos I (1975–2014) | |
| | Jaume Matas (born 1956) | 27 June 2003 | 6 July 2007 | 4 years and 8 days | PP | Matas II; PP | 2003 | King; Juan Carlos I (1975–2014) | |
| | Francesc Antich (1958–2025) | 6 July 2007 | 18 June 2011 | 3 years and 346 days | PSIB–PSOE | Antich II; PSOE–PSM–UM–EUIB–ERC until Dec 2009; PSOE–PSM–UM–EUIB until Feb 2010; PSOE–PSM–EUIB until Jul 2010; PSOE–PSM–IV from Jul 2010 | 2007 | King; Juan Carlos I (1975–2014) | |
| | José Ramón Bauzá (born 1970) | 18 June 2011 | 2 July 2015 | 4 years and 14 days | PP | Bauzá; PP | 2011 | King; Juan Carlos I (1975–2014) | |
| | José Ramón Bauzá (born 1970) | 18 June 2011 | 2 July 2015 | 4 years and 14 days | PP | Bauzá; PP | 2011 | King; Felipe VI (2014–present) | |
| | Francina Armengol (born 1971) | 2 July 2015 | 29 June 2019 | 7 years and 353 days | PSIB–PSOE | Armengol I PSOE–Més–MpM until Apr 2017; PSOE–Més from Apr 2017 | 2015 | King; Felipe VI (2014–present) | |
| | Francina Armengol (born 1971) | 29 June 2019 | 20 June 2023 | 7 years and 353 days | PSIB–PSOE | Armengol II; PSOE–UP–Més | 2019 | King; Felipe VI (2014–present) | |
| During this interval, Minister Mae de la Concha served as acting officeholder. | | | | | | Armengol II; PSOE–UP–Més | 2019 | King; Felipe VI (2014–present) | |
| | Marga Prohens (born 1982) | 7 July 2023 | Incumbent | 3 years and 62 days | PP | Prohens; PP | 2023 | King; Felipe VI (2014–present) | |
