= 2023 Balearic island council elections =

Elections in the Spanish region of the Balearic Islands

Island council elections were held in the Balearic Islands on 28 May 2023 to elect the 12th Consells Insulars of Mallorca and Menorca and the 5th Consells Insulars of Formentera and Ibiza. All 76 seats in the four island councils were up for election. They were held concurrently with regional elections in twelve autonomous communities and local elections all across Spain.

== Island control ==
The following table lists party control in the island councils. Gains for a party are highlighted in that party's colour.

| Island | Population | Previous control | New control |
|---|---|---|---|
| Formentera | 11,418 | People for Formentera (GxF) | Sa Unió de Formentera (Sa Unió) (INDEP in 2024; Sa Unió in 2024) |
| Ibiza | 154,210 | People's Party (PP) | People's Party (PP) |
| Mallorca | 914,564 | Socialist Party of the Balearic Islands (PSIB–PSOE) | People's Party (PP) |
| Menorca | 96,467 | Socialist Party of the Balearic Islands (PSIB–PSOE) | People's Party (PP) |

== Islands ==
=== Formentera ===
← Summary of the 28 May 2023 Island Council of Formentera election results →
| Parties and alliances | Popular vote | | | Seats | |
| Parties and alliances | Votes | % | ±pp | Total | +/− |
|---|---|---|---|---|---|
| The Union of Formentera (PP–CompromísFormentera) (Sa Unió) | 1,870 | 47.12 | +13.37 | 9 | +3 |
| People for Formentera (GxF) | 1,030 | 25.95 | −9.55 | 5 | −1 |
| Socialist Party of the Balearic Islands (PSIB–PSOE) | 702 | 17.69 | −9.18 | 3 | −2 |
| We Can (Podemos) | 156 | 3.93 | New | 0 | ±0 |
| Vox (Vox) | 77 | 1.94 | −0.78 | 0 | ±0 |
| Libertarian Party (P–LIB) | 50 | 1.26 | New | 0 | ±0 |
| Blank ballots | 83 | 2.09 | +0.92 | | |
| Total | 3,968 | | | 17 | ±0 |
| Valid votes | 3,968 | 98.85 | +0.31 | | |
| Invalid votes | 46 | 1.14 | −0.31 | | |
| Votes cast / turnout | 4,014 | 54.96 | +3.44 | | |
| Abstentions | 3,289 | 45.03 | −3.44 | | |
| Registered voters | 7,303 | | | | |

=== Ibiza ===
← Summary of the 28 May 2023 Island Council of Ibiza election results →
| Parties and alliances | Popular vote | | | Seats | |
| Parties and alliances | Votes | % | ±pp | Total | +/− |
|---|---|---|---|---|---|
| People's Party (PP) | 23,330 | 52.44 | +13.01 | 8 | +2 |
| Socialist Party of the Balearic Islands (PSIB–PSOE) | 10,820 | 24.32 | −4.22 | 3 | −2 |
| Vox (Vox) | 3,631 | 8.16 | +4.01 | 1 | +1 |
| United We Can (EUIB–Podemos) | 2,820 | 6.34 | −5.67 | 1 | ±0 |
| Now Ibiza (Ara Eivissa) | 1,486 | 3.34 | +0.30 | 0 | ±0 |
| Citizens–Party of the Citizenry (CS) | 670 | 1.51 | −5.39 | 0 | −1 |
| EPIC Ibiza Citizen Movement–El Pi (EPIC–El Pi)^{1} | 585 | 1.31 | −3.62 | 0 | ±0 |
| For the Balearics (PerxB) | 455 | 1.02 | New | 0 | ±0 |
| Blank ballots | 693 | 1.56 | +0.55 | | |
| Total | 44,490 | | | 13 | ±0 |
| Valid votes | 44,490 | 98.56 | −0.49 | | |
| Invalid votes | 652 | 0.14 | +0.49 | | |
| Votes cast / turnout | 45,142 | 47.19 | −2.20 | | |
| Abstentions | 50,509 | 52.81 | +2.20 | | |
| Registered voters | 95,651 | | | | |
Sources
Footnotes: ^{1} EPIC Ibiza Citizen Movement–El Pi results are compared to the combined totals of Proposal for Ibiza and EPIC Ibiza Citizen Movement in the 2019 election.

=== Mallorca ===
← Summary of the 28 May 2023 Island Council of Mallorca election results →
| Parties and alliances | Popular vote | | | Seats | |
| Parties and alliances | Votes | % | ±pp | Total | +/− |
|---|---|---|---|---|---|
| People's Party (PP) | 123,380 | 34.16 | +13.57 | 13 | +6 |
| Socialist Party of the Balearic Islands (PSIB–PSOE) | 92,050 | 25.49 | −1.03 | 9 | −1 |
| Vox (Vox) | 55,202 | 15.28 | +6.19 | 5 | +2 |
| More for Mallorca (Més) | 42,197 | 11.68 | −1.01 | 4 | ±0 |
| El Pi–Proposal for the Isles (El Pi) | 18,905 | 5.23 | −3.91 | 2 | −1 |
| United We Can (EUIB–Podemos) | 15,455 | 4.28 | −5.23 | 0 | −3 |
| Citizens–Party of the Citizenry (CS) | 4,920 | 1.36 | −8.95 | 0 | −3 |
| Coalition for the Balearics (CperB) | 988 | 0.27 | New | 0 | ±0 |
| Spanish Liberal Project (PLIE) | 825 | 0.23 | +0.10 | 0 | ±0 |
| Political Reset (Reset) | 693 | 0.19 | New | 0 | ±0 |
| New National Order (Orden) | 381 | 0.11 | New | 0 | ±0 |
| Blank ballots | 6,172 | 1.71 | +0.55 | | |
| Total | 361,168 | | | 33 | ±0 |
| Valid votes | 361,168 | 98.69 | −0.10 | | |
| Invalid votes | 4,801 | 1.31 | +0.10 | | |
| Votes cast / turnout | 365,969 | 58.86 | +2.68 | | |
| Abstentions | 255,759 | 41.14 | −2.68 | | |
| Registered voters | 621,728 | | | | |

=== Menorca ===
← Summary of the 28 May 2023 Island Council of Menorca election results →
| Parties and alliances | Popular vote | | | Seats | |
| Parties and alliances | Votes | % | ±pp | Total | +/− |
|---|---|---|---|---|---|
| People's Party (PP) | 15,307 | 39.38 | +10.74 | 6 | +2 |
| Socialist Party of the Balearic Islands (PSIB–PSOE) | 10,554 | 27.15 | +0.47 | 4 | ±0 |
| More for Menorca (MxMe) | 6,772 | 17.42 | −0.40 | 2 | −1 |
| Vox (Vox) | 2,420 | 6.23 | +3.53 | 1 | +1 |
| United We Can (EUIB–Podemos) | 2,388 | 6.17 | −4.87 | 0 | −1 |
| Citizens–Party of the Citizenry (CS) | 517 | 1.33 | −7.27 | 0 | −1 |
| Spanish Liberal Project (PLIE) | 170 | 0.44 | +0.29 | 0 | ±0 |
| Blank ballots | 743 | 1.91 | +0.67 | | |
| Total | 38,871 | | | 13 | ±0 |
| Valid votes | 38,871 | 98.46 | −0.51 | | |
| Invalid votes | 606 | 1.54 | +0.51 | | |
| Votes cast / turnout | 39,477 | 55.03 | −2.99 | | |
| Abstentions | 32,261 | 44.97 | +2.99 | | |
| Registered voters | 71,738 | | | | |

== See also ==
- 2023 Balearic regional election
