= 2003 Balearic regional election =

Election in the Spanish region of the Balearic Islands

- 25 May 2003

All 59 seats in the Parliament of the Balearic Islands 30 seats needed for a majority
- Opinion polls
- Registered: 682,857 ▲6.8%
- Turnout: 429,135 (62.8%) ▲5.3 pp
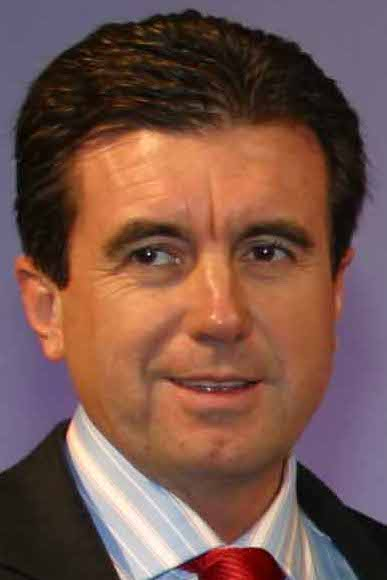

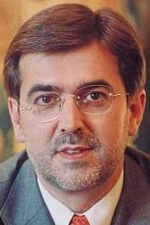

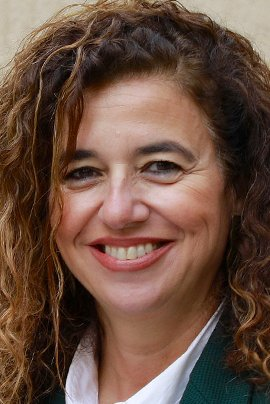

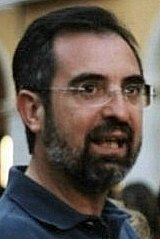

	First party	Second party	Third party
Leader	Jaume Matas	Francesc Antich	Pilar Costa
Party	PP	PSIB–PSOE	Pacte+COP
Leader since	17 June 1996	9 November 1998	21 March 1999
Leader's seat	Mallorca	Mallorca	Ibiza
Last election	28 seats, 44.0%	13 seats, 22.0%	7 seats, 4.9%
Seats won	29	15	5
Seat change	▲1	▲2	▼2
Popular vote	190,562	104,614	16,811
Percentage	44.7%	24.5%	3.9%
Swing	▲0.7 pp	▲2.5 pp	▼1.0 pp
	Fourth party	Fifth party	Sixth party
Leader	Pere Sampol	Maria Antònia Munar	Margalida Rosselló
Party	PSM–EN	UM	EU–EV
Leader since	1991	1 July 1991	2002
Leader's seat	Mallorca	Mallorca	Mallorca
Last election	5 seats, 11.7%	3 seats, 7.3%	3 seats, 5.4%
Seats won	4	3	2
Seat change	▼1	0	▼1
Popular vote	33,920	31,781	20,797
Percentage	8.0%	7.5%	4.9%
Swing	▼3.7 pp	▲0.2 pp	▼0.5 pp
	Seventh party
Leader	Josep Mayans Serra
Party	AIPF
Leader since	2003
Leader's seat	Formentera
Last election	0 seats, 0.3%
Seats won	1
Seat change	▲1
Popular vote	1,647
Percentage	0.4%
Swing	▲0.1 pp
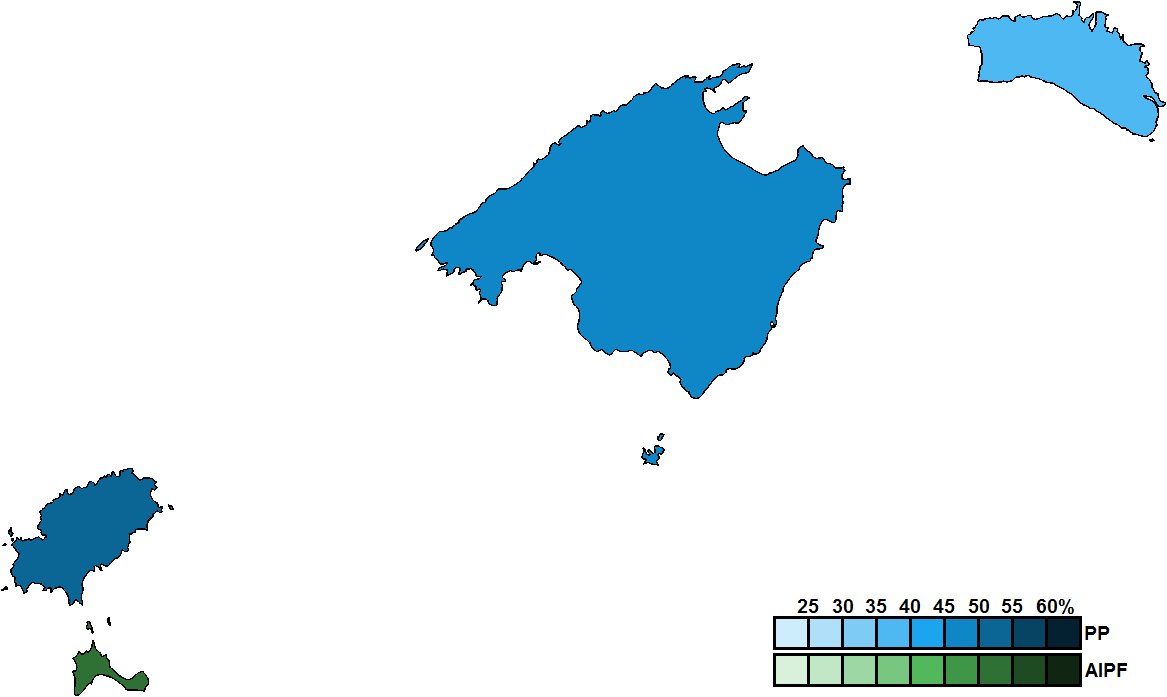
- Constituency results map for the Parliament of the Balearic Islands
President before election
Francesc Antich
PSOE
President after election
Jaume Matas
PP

A regional election was held in the Balearic Islands on 25 May 2003 to elect the 6th Parliament of the autonomous community. All 59 seats in the Parliament were up for election. It was held concurrently with regional elections in twelve other autonomous communities and local elections all across Spain.

== Overview ==
Under the 1983 Statute of Autonomy, the Parliament of the Balearic Islands was the unicameral legislature of the homonymous autonomous community, having legislative power in devolved matters, as well as the ability to grant or withdraw confidence from a regional president. The electoral and procedural rules were supplemented by national law provisions.

=== Date ===
The term of the Parliament of the Balearic Islands expired four years after the date of its previous ordinary election, with election day being fixed for the fourth Sunday of May every four years. The election decree was required to be issued no later than 54 days before the scheduled election date and published on the following day in the Official Gazette of the Balearic Islands (BOIB). The previous election was held on 13 June 1999, setting the date for election day on the fourth Sunday of May four years later, which was 25 May 2003.

The Parliament of the Balearic Islands could not be dissolved before the expiration date of parliament, except in the event of an investiture process failing to elect a regional president within a 60-day period from the Parliament's reconvening. In such a case, the chamber was to be automatically dissolved and a snap election called, with elected lawmakers serving the remainder of its original four-year term.

The election to the Parliament of the Balearic Islands was officially called on 1 April 2003 with the publication of the corresponding decree in the BOIB, setting election day for 25 May.

=== Electoral system ===
Voting for the Parliament was based on universal suffrage, comprising all Spanish nationals over 18 years of age, registered in the Balearic Islands and with full political rights, provided that they had not been deprived of the right to vote by a final sentence, nor were legally incapacitated.

The Parliament of the Balearic Islands had 59 seats. All were elected in four multi-member constituencies—corresponding to the islands of Mallorca, Menorca, Ibiza and Formentera, each of which was assigned a fixed number of seats—using the D'Hondt method and closed-list proportional voting, with a five percent-threshold of valid votes (including blank ballots) in each constituency. The use of this electoral method resulted in a higher effective threshold depending on district magnitude and vote distribution.

As a result of the aforementioned allocation, each Parliament constituency was entitled the following seats:

Seats	Constituencies
33	Mallorca
13	Menorca
12	Ibiza
1	Formentera

The law did not provide for by-elections to fill vacant seats; instead, any vacancies arising after the proclamation of candidates and during the legislative term were filled by the next candidates on the party lists or, when required, by designated substitutes.

=== Outgoing parliament ===
The table below shows the composition of the parliamentary groups in the chamber at the time of the election call.

Parliamentary composition in April 2003
Groups	Parties	Legislators	
Groups	Parties	Seats	Total
People's Parliamentary Group	PP	28	28
Socialist Parliamentary Group	PSIB–PSOE	17	17
PSM–EN Parliamentary Group	PSM	4	5
PSM–EN Parliamentary Group	PSMe	1	5
United and Ecologist Left Parliamentary Group	EUIB	4	4
Mixed Parliamentary Group	UM	3	5
Mixed Parliamentary Group	EV	1	5
Mixed Parliamentary Group	COP	1	5

== Parties and candidates ==
The electoral law allowed for parties and federations registered in the interior ministry, alliances and groupings of electors to present lists of candidates. Parties and federations intending to form an alliance were required to inform the relevant electoral commission within 10 days of the election call, whereas groupings of electors needed to secure the signature of at least one percent of the electorate in the constituencies for which they sought election, disallowing electors from signing for more than one list.

Below is a list of the main parties and alliances which contested the election:

Candidacy	Parties and alliances	Leading candidate	Ideology	Previous result		Gov.	Ref.
Candidacy	Parties and alliances	Leading candidate	Ideology	Vote %	Seats	Gov.	Ref.
PP	List: People's Party (PP)	Jaume Matas	Conservatism; Christian democracy	44.0%	28	No	
PSIB–PSOE	List: Socialist Party of the Balearic Islands (PSIB–PSOE)	Francesc Antich	Social democracy	22.0%	13	Yes	
Pacte+COP	List: Socialist Party of the Balearic Islands (PSIB–PSOE) (Note: In Ibiza and Formentera.); United Left of the Balearic Islands (EUIB); Nationalist and Ecologist Agreement (ENE); Republican Left of Catalonia (ERC) (Note: In Ibiza.)	Pilar Costa	Progressivism	4.9%	7	Yes	
PSM–EN	List: Socialist Party of Mallorca (PSM); Socialist Party of Menorca (PSMe)	Pere Sampol	Left-wing nationalism Democratic socialism Environmentalism	11.7%	5	Yes	
UM	List: Majorcan Union (UM)	Maria Antònia Munar	Regionalism; Liberalism	7.3%	3	No	
EU–EV	List: United Left of Mallorca (EU); The Greens of Mallorca (EV); Left of Menorca–United Left (EM–EU)	Margalida Rosselló	Socialism; Communism	5.4%	3	Yes	
AIPF	List: Independent Popular Council of Formentera (AIPF)	José Mayans Serra	Conservatism	0.3%	0	No	

== Opinion polls ==
The tables below list opinion polling results in reverse chronological order, showing the most recent first and using the dates when the survey fieldwork was done, as opposed to the date of publication. Where the fieldwork dates are unknown, the date of publication is given instead. The highest percentage figure in each polling survey is displayed with its background shaded in the leading party's colour. If a tie ensues, this is applied to the figures with the highest percentages. The "Lead" column on the right shows the percentage-point difference between the parties with the highest percentages in a poll.

=== Voting intention estimates ===
The table below lists weighted voting intention estimates. Refusals are generally excluded from the party vote percentages, while question wording and the treatment of "don't know" responses and those not intending to vote may vary between polling organisations. When available, seat projections determined by the polling organisations are displayed below (or in place of) the percentages in a smaller font; 30 seats were required for an absolute majority in the Parliament of the Balearic Islands.

Color key:

Exit poll

Polling firm/Commissioner	Fieldwork date	Sample size	Turnout	PP	PSIB–PSOE	PSM	UM	EUIB	Pacte	COP	AIPF	EVIB	Lead
2003 regional election	25 May 2003	—N/a	62.8	44.7; 29	24.5; 15	8.0; 4	7.5; 3	4.9; 2	3.6; 5	0.3; 0	0.4; 1	0.6; 0	20.2
Sigma Dos/Antena 3	25 May 2003	?	?	? 21/28	? 15/16	? 4/5	? 2/3	? 3	? 6/7	? 1	–	–	?
Vox Pública/El Periódico	29 Apr 2003	808	?	40.0– 41.0; 25/28	25.5– 26.5; 15/16	8.5– 9.5; 4/6	9.5– 10.5; 4	5.0– 6.5; 1/3	3.5– 4.5; 5/6	0.3– 0.6; 1	–	? 0/1	14.5
CIS	22 Mar–28 Apr 2003	911	70.2	37.1; 23	28.1; 22	11.0; 5	7.8; 3	12.0; 5	(Note: Within PSIB–PSOE.)		(Note: Within PP.)	–	9.0
CIS	9 Sep–9 Oct 2002	447	73.1	41.8	22.7	11.6	7.2	6.2		1.3		8.4	19.1
2000 general election	12 Mar 2000	—N/a	61.4	53.9	29.3	5.9	2.1	4.0	–	–	–	2.4	24.6
1999 regional election	13 Jun 1999	—N/a	57.5	44.0; 28	22.0; 13	11.7; 5	7.3; 3	5.4; 3	4.4; 6	0.4; 1	0.3; 0	(Note: Within EUIB.)	22.0

== Results ==
=== Overall ===
← Summary of the 25 May 2003 Parliament of the Balearic Islands election results →
Parties and alliances	Popular vote			Seats	
Parties and alliances	Votes	%	±pp	Total	+/−
People's Party (PP)	190,562	44.70	+0.69	29	+1
Socialist Party of the Balearic Islands (PSIB–PSOE)	104,614	24.54	+2.52	15	+2
PSM–Nationalist Agreement (PSM–EN)	33,920	7.95	−3.77	4	−1
Socialist Party of Mallorca–Nationalist Agreement (PSM–EN)	30,964	7.26	−3.57	3	−1
Socialist Party of Menorca–Nationalist Agreement (PSM–EN)	2,956	0.69	−0.20	1	±0
Majorcan Union (UM)	31,781	7.45	+0.14	3	±0
United Left–The Greens (EU–EV)	20,797	4.88	−0.55	2	−1
United Left of Mallorca–The Greens of Mallorca (EU–EV)	19,050	4.47	−0.30	2	±0
Left of Menorca–United Left (EM–EU)	1,747	0.41	−0.25	0	−1
Progressive Pact+Coalition of Progressive Organizations (Pacte+COP)	16,811	3.94	−0.91	5	−2
Progressive Pact (Pacte)	15,513	3.64	−0.79	5	−1
Coalition of Progressive Organizations (COP)	1,298	0.30	−0.12	0	−1
Independent Social Group (ASI)	6,707	1.57	+0.92	0	±0
Key of Mallorca (Clau)	3,030	0.71	New	0	±0
The Greens (EV)	2,411	0.57	New	0	±0
Republican Left of Catalonia (ERC)	1,667	0.39	+0.09	0	±0
Independent Popular Council of Formentera (AIPF)	1,647	0.39	+0.07	1	+1
Balearic Islands Renewal Party (PRIB)	1,162	0.27	New	0	±0
Union of Centrists of Menorca (UCM)	1,129	0.26	New	0	±0
Civic Union (UC)	751	0.18	−0.08	0	±0
Menorcan Party (PMQ)	566	0.13	New	0	±0
Workers for Democracy Coalition (TD)	438	0.10	−0.03	0	±0
Citizens for Blank Votes (CenB)	416	0.10	New	0	±0
European Green Group (GVE)	373	0.09	New	0	±0
Renewal Party of Ibiza and Formentera (PREF)	335	0.08	New	0	±0
Balearic People's Union (UPB)	130	0.03	−0.58	0	±0
Blank ballots	7,093	1.66	−0.20		
Total	426,340			59	±0
Valid votes	426,340	99.35	+0.13		
Invalid votes	2,795	0.65	−0.13		
Votes cast / turnout	429,135	62.84	+5.34		
Abstentions	253,722	37.16	−5.34		
Registered voters	682,857				

Popular vote
PP	44.70%
PSIB–PSOE	24.54%
PSM–EN	7.95%
UM	7.45%
EU–EV	4.88%
Pacte+COP	3.94%
ASI	1.57%
AIPF	0.39%
Others	2.91%
Blank ballots	1.66%

Seats
PP	49.15%
PSIB–PSOE	25.42%
Pacte+COP	8.47%
PSM–EN	6.78%
UM	5.08%
EU–EV	3.39%
AIPF	1.69%

=== Distribution by constituency ===
Constituency	PP		PSIB		PSM–EN		UM		EU–EV		Pacte		AIPF	
Constituency	%	S	%	S	%	S	%	S	%	S	%	S	%	S
Formentera													53.4	1
Ibiza	50.4	7									37.8	5		
Mallorca	45.0	16	26.3	9	9.0	3	9.2	3	5.5	2				
Menorca	39.1	6	37.3	6	8.1	1			4.8	−				
Total	44.7	29	24.5	15	8.0	4	7.5	3	4.9	2	3.6	5	0.4	1

== Aftermath ==
=== Government formation ===
Investiture; Nomination of Jaume Matas (PP)
Ballot →	26 June 2003
Required majority →	30 out of 59
Yes: • PP (29); • UM (3); • AIPF (1)	33 / 59
No: • PSIB (18); • EU–EV (4); • EN (3)	25 / 59
Abstentions	0 / 59
Absentees: • PSM (1)	1 / 59

== Bibliography ==
- Ley Orgánica 2/1983, de 25 de febrero, de Estatuto de Autonomía para las islas Baleares (Organic Law 2/1983). Official State Gazette (in Spanish). 1 March 1983. BOE-A-1983-6316.
- Ley Orgánica 5/1985, de 19 de junio, del Régimen Electoral General (Organic Law 5/1985). Official State Gazette (in Spanish). 19 June 1985 [version as of 11 March 2003]. BOE-A-1985-11672.
- Ley 8/1986, de 26 de noviembre, Electoral de la Comunidad Autónoma de las Islas Baleares (Law 8/1986). Official State Gazette (in Spanish). 26 November 1986 [version as of 28 March 2003]. BOE-A-1987-2903.
- Ley Orgánica 3/1999, de 8 de enero, de reforma de la Ley Orgánica 2/1983, de Estatuto de Autonomía de las Illes Balears (Organic Law 3/1999). Official State Gazette (in Spanish). 8 January 1999. BOE-A-1999-458.
- Ley 4/2001, de 14 de marzo, del Gobierno de las Illes Balears (Law 4/2001). Official State Gazette (in Spanish). 14 March 2001 [version as of 15 March 2001]. BOE-A-2001-7026.
- Decreto 2/2003, de 31 de marzo, del Presidente de las Illes Balears de convocatoria de elecciones al Parlamento de las Illes Balears (PDF) (Decree 2/2003). Official Gazette of the Balearic Islands (in Spanish). 31 March 2003.
