= Mallorca (Parliament of the Balearic Islands constituency) =

Coordinates: 39°37′N 2°59′W

- Parliament of the Balearic Islands; Electoral constituency
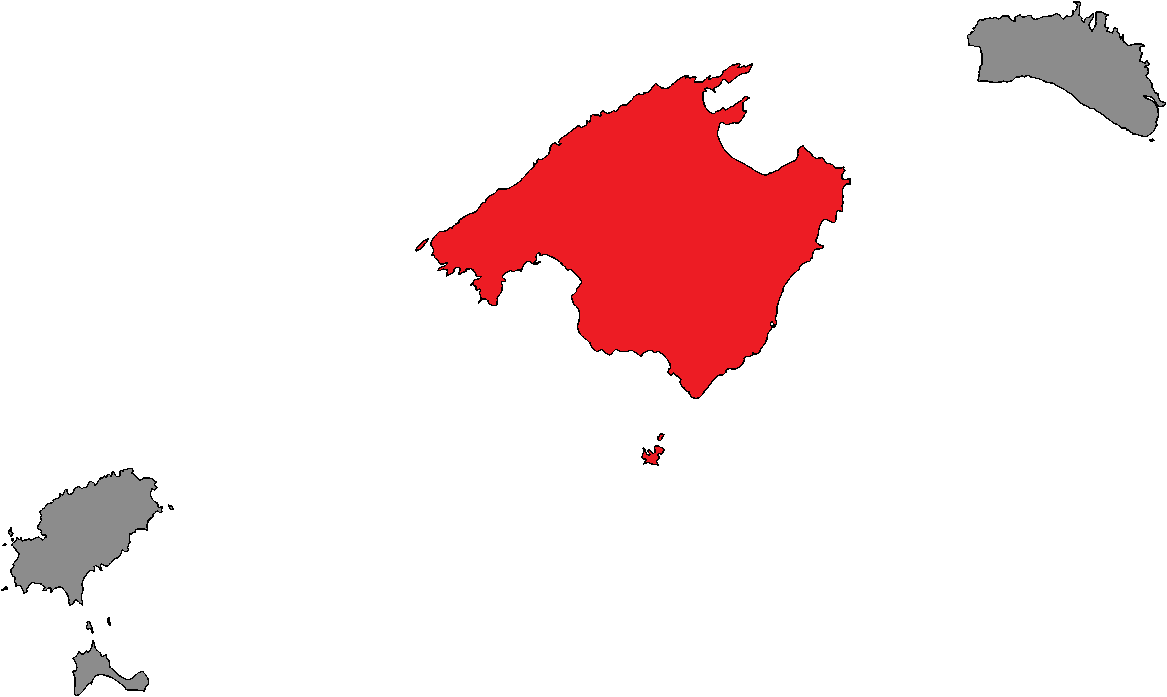
- Location of Mallorca within the Balearic Islands
- Island: Mallorca
- Autonomous community: Balearic Islands
- Population: ▲949,047 (2024)
- Electorate: ▲647,787 (2023)
- Major settlements: Palma, Calvià

Current constituency
- Created: 1983
- Seats: 30 (1983–1987); 33 (1987–present)
- Members: PP (13); PSIB (10); Vox (6); Més (4)

Mallorca (also Majorca) is one of the four constituencies (Spanish: circunscripciones) represented in the Parliament of the Balearic Islands, the regional legislature of the Autonomous Community of the Balearic Islands. The constituency currently elects 33 deputies. Its boundaries correspond to those of the island of Mallorca. The electoral system uses the D'Hondt method and closed-list proportional representation, with a minimum threshold of five percent.

Until the 2003 election, the results in this district were also used to determine the composition of the Island Council of Mallorca—with the same seats—during the same term as the Parliament. From the 2007 election onwards, a separate election is held. Additionally, on 3 April 1979 the first independent election for the Island Council of Mallorca was held, electing 24 councillors.

== Electoral system ==
The constituency was created as per the Statute of Autonomy of the Balearic Islands of 1983 and was first contested in the 1983 regional election. The Statute provided for the four main islands in the Balearic archipelago—Majorca, Menorca, Ibiza and Formentera—to be established as multi-member districts in the Parliament of the Balearic Islands, with this regulation being maintained under the 1986 regional electoral law. Each constituency is allocated a fixed number of seats: 33 for Majorca, 13 for Menorca, 12 for Ibiza and 1 for Formentera. The exception was the 1983 election, when these numbers were 30, 12, 11 and 1, respectively.

Voting is on the basis of universal suffrage, which comprises all nationals over eighteen, registered in the Balearic Islands and in full enjoyment of their political rights. Amendments to the electoral law in 2011 required for Balearic citizens abroad to apply for voting before being permitted to vote, a system known as "begged" or expat vote (Spanish: Voto rogado) which was abolished in 2022. Seats are elected using the D'Hondt method and a closed list proportional representation, with an electoral threshold of five percent of valid votes—which includes blank ballots; until a 1995 reform, the threshold was set at three percent—being applied in each constituency. The use of the D'Hondt method may result in a higher effective threshold, depending on the district magnitude.

The electoral law allows for parties and federations registered in the interior ministry, coalitions and groupings of electors to present lists of candidates. Parties and federations intending to form a coalition ahead of an election are required to inform the relevant Electoral Commission within ten days of the election call—fifteen before 1985—whereas groupings of electors need to secure the signature of at least one percent of the electorate in the constituencies for which they seek election—one-thousandth of the electorate, with a compulsory minimum of 500 signatures, until 1985—disallowing electors from signing for more than one list of candidates.

== Deputies ==
Deputies 1983–present
Key to parties EU Podemos–EUIB Podemos/Podem PSM/PSM–IV–ExM Bloc Més PSIB–PSOE CDS El Pi Cs UIM–IM UM PP/PP–UM CP AP–PL Vox
Parliament	Election	Distribution
1st	1983	2 / 11 / 6 / 11
2nd	1987	2 / 11 / 3 / 4 / 13
3rd	1991	3 / 11 / 1 / 18
4th	1995	2 / 5 / 8 / 2 / 16
5th	1999	2 / 4 / 8 / 3 / 16
6th	2003	2 / 3 / 9 / 3 / 16
7th	2007	4 / 10 / 3 / 16
8th	2011	4 / 10 / 19
9th	2015	5 / 6 / 7 / 3 / 2 / 10
10th	2019	3 / 4 / 10 / 3 / 3 / 7 / 3
11th	2023	4 / 10 / 13 / 6

== Regional elections ==
=== 2023 ===
Summary of the 28 May 2023 Parliament of the Balearic Islands election results in Mallorca
Parties and alliances	Popular vote			Seats	
Parties and alliances	Votes	%	±pp	Total	+/−
People's Party (PP)	124,401	34.24	+13.70	13	+6
Socialist Party of the Balearic Islands (PSIB–PSOE)	97,688	26.89	–0.30	10	±0
Vox (Vox)	55,610	15.31	+6.10	6	+3
More for Mallorca (Més)	37,651	10.36	–1.21	4	±0
El Pi–Proposal for the Isles (El Pi)	17,089	4.70	–4.20	0	–3
United We Can (EUIB–Podemos)	14,496	3.99	–5.42	0	–3
Citizens–Party of the Citizenry (CS)	4,940	1.36	–8.82	0	–3
Progress in Green–PACMA (Progreso en Verde–PACMA)^{1}	3,596	0.99	–0.34	0	±0
Coalition for the Balearics (CperB)	762	0.21	New	0	±0
Spanish Liberal Project (PLIE)	659	0.18	+0.08	0	±0
Political Reset (Reset)	509	0.14	New	0	±0
New National Order (Orden)	359	0.10	New	0	±0
Blank ballots	5,545	1.53	+0.56		
Total	363,305			33	±0
Valid votes	363,305	98.77	–0.54		
Invalid votes	4,507	1.23	+0.54		
Votes cast / turnout	367,812	56.78	+2.20		
Abstentions	279,975	43.22	–2.20		
Registered voters	647,787				
Sources
Footnotes: ^{1} Progress in Green–PACMA results are compared to Animalist Party Against Mistreatment of Animals totals in the 2019 election.

=== 2019 ===
Summary of the 26 May 2019 Parliament of the Balearic Islands election results in Mallorca
Parties and alliances	Popular vote			Seats	
Parties and alliances	Votes	%	±pp	Total	+/−
Socialist Party of the Balearic Islands (PSIB–PSOE)	92,658	27.19	+9.05	10	+3
People's Party (PP)	70,002	20.54	–7.21	7	–3
More for Mallorca (Més)	39,415	11.57	–5.58	4	–2
Citizens–Party of the Citizenry (Cs)	34,686	10.18	+2.80	3	+1
United We Can (Podemos–EUIB)^{1}	32,080	9.41	–6.90	3	–2
Vox–Citizen Alternative for Tolerance, Unity and Action (Vox–ACTUA Baleares)	31,395	9.21	New	3	+3
El Pi–Proposal for the Isles (El Pi)	30,319	8.90	+0.12	3	±0
Animalist Party Against Mistreatment of Animals (PACMA)	4,529	1.33	+0.33	0	±0
Independent Social Group (ASI)	785	0.23	–0.04	0	±0
Act (PACT)	687	0.20	New	0	±0
Four Islands Movement (M4illes)	576	0.17	New	0	±0
Spanish Liberal Project (PLIE)	344	0.10	–0.05	0	±0
Blank ballots	3,290	0.97	–0.74		
Total	340,766			33	±0
Valid votes	340,766	99.31	+0.63		
Invalid votes	2,366	0.69	–0.63		
Votes cast / turnout	343,132	54.58	–4.01		
Abstentions	285,496	45.42	+4.01		
Registered voters	628,628				
Sources
Footnotes: ^{1} United We Can results are compared to the combined totals of We Can and Let's Win the Balearic Islands in the 2015 election.

=== 2015 ===
Summary of the 24 May 2015 Parliament of the Balearic Islands election results in Mallorca
Parties and alliances	Popular vote			Seats	
Parties and alliances	Votes	%	±pp	Total	+/−
People's Party (PP)	96,435	27.75	–18.70	10	–9
Socialist Party of the Balearic Islands (PSIB–PSOE)	63,045	18.14	–5.49	7	–3
More for Mallorca (Més)^{1}	59,617	17.15	+6.43	6	+2
We Can (Podemos/Podem)	50,773	14.61	New	5	+5
El Pi–Proposal for the Isles (El Pi)^{2}	30,527	8.78	+1.61	3	+3
Citizens–Party of the Citizenry (C's)	25,651	7.38	+7.13	2	+2
Let's Win the Balearic Islands (Guanyem)^{3}	5,920	1.70	–1.16	0	±0
Animalist Party Against Mistreatment of Animals (PACMA)	3,476	1.00	+0.62	0	±0
Union, Progress and Democracy (UPyD)	3,163	0.91	–1.26	0	±0
Independent Social Group (ASI)	953	0.27	–0.05	0	±0
Family and Life Party (PFyV)	802	0.23	+0.10	0	±0
Zero Cuts Mallorca (Recortes Cero)	612	0.17	New	0	±0
Spanish Liberal Project (PLIE)	531	0.15	–0.01	0	±0
Blank ballots	5,934	1.71	–1.00		
Total	347,439			33	±0
Valid votes	347,439	98.68	+0.23		
Invalid votes	4,654	1.32	–0.23		
Votes cast / turnout	352,093	58.59	–1.28		
Abstentions	248,846	41.41	+1.28		
Registered voters	600,939				
Sources
Footnotes: ^{1} More for Mallorca results are compared to PSM–Initiative Greens–Agreement totals in the 2011 election.; ^{2} El Pi–Proposal for the Isles results are compared to the combined totals of Regionalist League of the Balearic Islands and Convergence for the Isles in the 2011 election.; ^{3} Let's Win the Balearic Islands results are compared to United Left of the Balearic Islands totals in the 2011 election.

=== 2011 ===
Summary of the 22 May 2011 Parliament of the Balearic Islands election results in Mallorca
Parties and alliances	Popular vote			Seats	
Parties and alliances	Votes	%	±pp	Total	+/−
People's Party (PP)	156,692	46.45	–0.21	19	+3
Socialist Party of the Balearic Islands (PSIB–PSOE)	79,732	23.63	–6.47	10	±0
PSM–Initiative Greens–Agreement (PSM–IV–ExM)^{1}	36,181	10.72	n/a	4	+1
Regionalist League of the Balearic Islands (IB–Lliga)	12,294	3.64	New	0	±0
Convergence for the Isles (CxI)^{2}	11,913	3.53	–4.84	0	–3
United Left of the Balearic Islands (EUIB)^{1}	9,642	2.86	n/a	0	–1
Union, Progress and Democracy (UPyD)	7,336	2.17	New	0	±0
Republican Left (esquerra)^{1}	5,325	1.58	n/a	0	±0
Citizens for Blank Votes (CenB)	2,306	0.68	+0.40	0	±0
Anti-Bullfighting Party Against Mistreatment of Animals (PACMA)	1,275	0.38	New	0	±0
Independent Social Group (ASI)	1,094	0.32	–0.25	0	±0
Citizens–Party of the Citizenry (C's)	829	0.25	New	0	±0
Citizens of Democratic Centre (CCD)	621	0.18	New	0	±0
Workers for Democracy Coalition (TD)	567	0.17	+0.01	0	±0
Spanish Liberal Project (PLIE)	548	0.16	New	0	±0
Dissidents (Dissidents)	478	0.14	New	0	±0
Family and Life Party (PFyV)	449	0.13	New	0	±0
Republican Social Movement (MSR)	298	0.09	New	0	±0
Islander Party of the Balearic Islands (PIIB)	282	0.08	–0.03	0	±0
Balearic Radical Party (PRB)	207	0.06	New	0	±0
Blank ballots	9,287	2.71	+0.72		
Total	337,356			33	±0
Valid votes	337,356	98.45	–0.98		
Invalid votes	5,305	1.55	+0.98		
Votes cast / turnout	342,661	59.87	–1.19		
Abstentions	229,725	40.13	+1.19		
Registered voters	572,386				
Sources
Footnotes: ^{1} Within the Bloc for Mallorca alliance in the 2007 election.; ^{2} Convergence for the Isles results are compared to Majorcan Union totals in the 2007 election.

=== 2007 ===
Summary of the 27 May 2007 Parliament of the Balearic Islands election results in Mallorca
Parties and alliances	Popular vote			Seats	
Parties and alliances	Votes	%	±pp	Total	+/−
People's Party (PP)	157,135	46.66	+1.65	16	±0
Socialist Party of the Balearic Islands (PSIB–PSOE)	101,364	30.10	+3.78	10	+1
Bloc for Mallorca (PSM–EN, EU–EV, ERC)^{1}	37,572	11.16	–3.78	4	–1
Majorcan Union (UM)	28,178	8.37	–0.82	3	±0
Independent Social Group (ASI)	1,921	0.57	–1.09	0	±0
Citizens for Blank Votes (CenB)	937	0.28	New	0	±0
Balearic Party (PB)	802	0.24	New	0	±0
Balearic People's Union (UPB)	689	0.20	New	0	±0
Key of Mallorca (Clau)	546	0.16	–0.72	0	±0
Workers for Democracy Coalition (TD)	543	0.16	+0.03	0	±0
Islander Party of the Balearic Islands (PIIB)	366	0.11	New	0	±0
Blank ballots	6,696	1.99	+0.42		
Total	336,749			33	±0
Valid votes	336,749	99.43	+0.03		
Invalid votes	1,937	0.57	–0.03		
Votes cast / turnout	338,686	61.06	–2.68		
Abstentions	216,033	38.94	+2.68		
Registered voters	554,719				
Sources
Footnotes: ^{1} Bloc for Mallorca results are compared to the combined totals of PSM–Nationalist Agreement, United Left of Mallorca–The Greens of Mallorca and Republican Left of Catalonia in the 2003 election.

=== 2003 ===
Summary of the 25 May 2003 Parliament of the Balearic Islands election results in Mallorca
Parties and alliances	Popular vote			Seats	
Parties and alliances	Votes	%	±pp	Total	+/−
People's Party (PP)	155,641	45.01	+0.55	16	±0
Socialist Party of the Balearic Islands (PSIB–PSOE)	90,998	26.32	+3.26	9	+1
Majorcan Union (UM)	31,781	9.19	+0.12	3	±0
Socialist Party of Mallorca–Nationalist Agreement (PSM–EN)	30,964	8.95	–4.48	3	–1
United Left of Mallorca–The Greens of Mallorca (EU–EV)	19,050	5.51	–0.40	2	±0
Independent Social Group (ASI)	5,751	1.66	+0.86	0	±0
Key of Mallorca (Clau)	3,030	0.88	New	0	±0
Republican Left of Catalonia (ERC)	1,667	0.48	+0.10	0	±0
Balearic Islands Renewal Party (PRIB)	1,031	0.30	New	0	±0
Workers for Democracy Coalition (TD)	438	0.13	–0.03	0	±0
Blank ballots	5,440	1.57	–0.16		
Total	345,791			33	±0
Valid votes	345,791	99.40	+0.12		
Invalid votes	2,088	0.60	–0.12		
Votes cast / turnout	347,879	63.74	+6.35		
Abstentions	197,930	36.26	–6.35		
Registered voters	545,809				

=== 1999 ===
Summary of the 13 June 1999 Parliament of the Balearic Islands election results in Mallorca
Parties and alliances	Popular vote			Seats	
Parties and alliances	Votes	%	±pp	Total	+/−
People's Party (PP)	130,815	44.46	–0.11	16	±0
Socialist Party of the Balearic Islands (PSIB–PSOE)	67,840	23.06	+0.29	8	±0
Socialist Party of Mallorca–Nationalist Agreement (PSM–EN)	39,509	13.43	–0.01	4	–1
Majorcan Union (UM)	26,682	9.07	+2.56	3	+1
United Left of Mallorca–The Greens of Mallorca (EU–EV)^{1}	17,403	5.91	–3.63	2	±0
Independent Social Group (ASI)	2,368	0.80	+0.34	0	±0
Balearic People's Coalition (CPB)	1,643	0.56	New	0	±0
Republican Left of Catalonia (ERC)	1,106	0.38	–0.13	0	±0
Alternative Left of the Balearic Islands (EAIB)	675	0.23	New	0	±0
Social Democrats for Progress (SDP)	641	0.22	New	0	±0
Workers for Democracy Coalition (TD)^{2}	473	0.16	+0.06	0	±0
Blank ballots	5,083	1.73	+0.50		
Total	294,238			33	±0
Valid votes	294,238	99.28	–0.14		
Invalid votes	2,126	0.72	+0.14		
Votes cast / turnout	296,364	57.39	–6.98		
Abstentions	219,996	42.61	+6.98		
Registered voters	516,360				
Sources
Footnotes: ^{1} United Left of Mallorca–The Greens of Mallorca results are compared to the combined totals of United Left of Mallorca and The Greens of the Balearic Islands in Mallorca in the 1995 election.; ^{2} Workers for Democracy Coalition results are compared to Neighbourhood Movement–New Socialist Party totals in the 1995 election.

=== 1995 ===
Summary of the 28 May 1995 Parliament of the Balearic Islands election results in Mallorca
Parties and alliances	Popular vote			Seats	
Parties and alliances	Votes	%	±pp	Total	+/−
People's Party (PP)^{1}	136,767	44.57	–2.95	16	–2
Socialist Party of the Balearic Islands (PSIB–PSOE)	69,865	22.77	–6.62	8	–3
Socialist Party of Mallorca–Nationalists of Mallorca (PSM–NM)	41,242	13.44	+5.23	5	+2
Majorcan Union (UM)^{2}	19,966	6.51	+3.44	2	+1
United Left of Mallorca (IU)	19,846	6.47	+3.91	2	+2
The Greens of the Balearic Islands (EVIB)	9,422	3.07	+0.44	0	±0
Balearic Convergence (CB)	1,600	0.52	–1.49	0	±0
Republican Left of Catalonia (ERC)	1,576	0.51	New	0	±0
Independent Social Group (ASI)	1,425	0.46	New	0	±0
Spanish Phalanx of the CNSO (FE–JONS)	439	0.14	–0.08	0	±0
Platform of Independents of Spain (PIE)	378	0.12	New	0	±0
Neighborhood Movement–New Socialist Party (MV–NPS)^{3}	321	0.10	–0.11	0	±0
Balearic Radical Party (PRB)	219	0.07	–0.13	0	±0
Blank ballots	3,789	1.23	+0.40		
Total	306,855			33	±0
Valid votes	306,855	99.42	+0.05		
Invalid votes	1,801	0.58	–0.05		
Votes cast / turnout	308,656	64.37	+3.97		
Abstentions	179,917	35.63	–3.97		
Registered voters	479,508				
Sources
Footnotes: ^{1} People's Party results are compared to People's Party–Majorcan Union totals in the 1991 election.; ^{2} Majorcan Union results are compared to Independent Union of Mallorca–Independents of Mallorca totals in the 1991 election.; ^{3} Neighborhood Movement–New Socialist Party results are compared to Alliance for the Republic totals in the 1991 election.

=== 1991 ===
Summary of the 25 May 1991 Parliament of the Balearic Islands election results in Mallorca
Parties and alliances	Popular vote			Seats	
Parties and alliances	Votes	%	±pp	Total	+/−
People's Party–Majorcan Union (PP–UM)^{1}	130,275	47.52	–0.14	18	+1
Socialist Party of the Balearic Islands (PSIB–PSOE)	80,569	29.39	–2.40	11	±0
Socialist Party of Mallorca–Nationalists of Mallorca (PSM–NM)	22,522	8.21	+2.29	3	+1
Independent Union of Mallorca–Independents of Mallorca (UIM–IM)	8,429	3.07	New	1	+1
Democratic and Social Centre (CDS)	8,137	2.97	–7.52	0	–3
The Greens (EV)	7,205	2.63	New	0	±0
United Left (EU–IU)	7,006	2.56	+0.19	0	±0
Balearic Convergence (CB)	5,513	2.01	New	0	±0
Spanish Phalanx of the CNSO (FE–JONS)	600	0.22	New	0	±0
Alliance for the Republic (AxR)	586	0.21	New	0	±0
Balearic Radical Party (PRB)	549	0.20	New	0	±0
Blank ballots	2,272	0.83	–0.21		
Total	274,163			33	±0
Valid votes	274,163	99.37	+0.64		
Invalid votes	1,732	0.63	–0.64		
Votes cast / turnout	275,895	60.40	–7.36		
Abstentions	180,874	39.60	+7.36		
Registered voters	456,769				
Sources
Footnotes: ^{1} People's Party–Majorcan Union results are compared to the combined totals of People's Alliance–Liberal Party, Majorcan Union and People's Democratic Party in the 1987 election.

=== 1987 ===
Summary of the 10 June 1987 Parliament of the Balearic Islands election results in Mallorca
Parties and alliances	Popular vote			Seats	
Parties and alliances	Votes	%	±pp	Total	+/−
People's Alliance–Liberal Party (AP–PL)^{1}	96,470	34.85	+0.53	13	+2
Spanish Socialist Workers' Party (PSOE)	87,986	31.79	–2.87	11	±0
Majorcan Union (UM)	30,247	10.93	–7.39	4	–2
Democratic and Social Centre (CDS)	29,028	10.49	+8.11	3	+3
Socialist Party of Mallorca–Nationalist Left (PSM–EN)	16,383	5.92	–0.71	2	±0
United Left (EU–IU)^{2}	6,549	2.37	–0.18	0	±0
People's Democratic Party (PDP)	5,212	1.88	New	0	±0
Workers' Party of Spain–Communist Unity (PTE–UC)	1,072	0.39	New	0	±0
Life and Autonomy (VIA)	961	0.35	New	0	±0
Blank ballots	2,883	1.04	+0.48		
Total	276,791			33	+3
Valid votes	276,791	98.73	+0.31		
Invalid votes	3,554	1.27	–0.31		
Votes cast / turnout	280,345	67.76	+2.71		
Abstentions	133,411	32.24	–2.71		
Registered voters	413,756				
Sources
Footnotes: ^{1} People's Alliance–Liberal Party results are compared to People's Coalition totals in the 1983 election.; ^{2} United Left results are compared to Communist Party of the Balearic Islands totals in the 1983 election.

=== 1983 ===
Summary of the 8 May 1983 Parliament of the Balearic Islands election results in Mallorca
Parties and alliances	Popular vote			Seats	
Parties and alliances	Votes	%	±pp	Total	+/−
Spanish Socialist Workers' Party (PSOE)	88,771	34.66	n/a	11	n/a
People's Coalition (AP–PDP–UL)	87,893	34.32	n/a	11	n/a
Majorcan Union (UM)	46,915	18.32	n/a	6	n/a
Socialist Party of Mallorca–Socialist Party of the Islands (PSM–PSI)	16,979	6.63	n/a	2	n/a
Communist Party of the Balearic Islands (PCIB)	6,525	2.55	n/a	0	n/a
Democratic and Social Centre (CDS)	6,101	2.38	n/a	0	n/a
Spanish Communist Workers' Party (PCOE)	1,509	0.59	n/a	0	n/a
Blank ballots	1,437	0.56	n/a		
Total	256,130			30	n/a
Valid votes	256,130	98.42	n/a		
Invalid votes	4,101	1.58	n/a		
Votes cast / turnout	260,231	65.05	n/a		
Abstentions	139,824	34.95	n/a		
Registered voters	400,055				
