= Miquel Vidal =

Spanish politician

Miquel Vidal Vidal (born 1960) is a Spanish People's Party politician. He was mayor of his hometown of Santanyí on Mallorca from 1999 to 2013. He was a deputy in the Parliament of the Balearic Islands from 2015 to 2023, and the interim president of the People's Party of the Balearic Islands from 2015 to 2017.

== Biography ==
Born in Santanyí, Mallorca, Vidal graduated with a degree in biology and a diploma in teaching. He was elected mayor of his hometown in 1999 and remained in office until his resignation in 2013, when he passed the role on to his deputy, Llorenç Galmés.

Shortly before his resignation, Vidal voiced that the PP-led Government of the Balearic Islands should print school textbooks in the standard form of the Catalan language and not in Balearic dialects of the language. He cited the archipelago's statute of autonomy that states that its official languages are Spanish and Catalan.

Vidal was director general for the environment in the Government of the Balearic Islands from 1991 to 1995, and the PP spokesperson in the Island Council of Mallorca from 2011 to 2015. He was elected to the Parliament of the Balearic Islands in the 2015 regional election, for the Mallorca constituency.

In July 2015, Vidal was named interim president of the People's Party of the Balearic Islands as José Ramón Bauzá resigned his role after losing the regional government. The following year, he was involved in controversy when the newspaper El Mundo revealed that he earned €28,000 annually for this party position in addition to €60,000 per year as a deputy in the regional parliament. He relinquished his party salary as a way to protect its image, but also said that the salary was necessary for his travel expenses (which he estimated at 584 km per day) and that the salary was less than a cleaner or waiter would earn. In March 2017, Biel Company was elected as the permanent president of the party.

For the 2023 Balearic regional election, new PP leader Marga Prohens did not name Vidal on the list of candidates, nor Company.
