= Coalition of Progressive Organizations =

Former political alliance in the Balearic Islands

Coalition of Progressive Organizations Coalició d'Organitzacions Progressistes
- Founded: 1999
- Dissolved: 2007
- Merger of: Socialist Party of the Balearic Islands; United Left of the Balearic Islands; The Greens (1999–2003)
- Political position: Centre-left to left-wing
- Colours

The Coalition of Progressive Organizations (Catalan: Coalició d'Organitzacions Progressistes, COP) was an electoral alliance formed in Formentera by the Socialist Party of the Balearic Islands, United Left of the Balearic Islands and The Greens to contest the 1999 and 2003 regional elections.

== Composition ==
Party
Socialist Party of the Balearic Islands (PSIB–PSOE)
United Left of the Balearic Islands (EUIB)
The Greens (EV) (1999–2003)
