= Cristòfol Soler =

Spanish politician (born 1956)

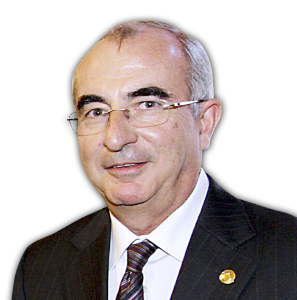

President of the Government of the Balearic Islands
- In office 28 July 1995 – 18 June 1996
- Monarch: Juan Carlos I
- Deputy: Rosa Estaràs
- Preceded by: Gabriel Cañellas
- Succeeded by: Jaume Matas

Personal details
- Born: Cristòfol Soler i Cladera; 26 December 1956 (age 69) Inca (Balearic Islands), Spain
- Party: People's Party (until 2014)
- Education: University of Valencia

Cristòfol Soler i Cladera (Catalan: [kɾisˈtɔfol soˈle i kləˈðeɾə]; born 26 December 1956) is a Spanish politician. He served as President of the Balearic Islands from July 1995 to June 1996, when his own party (People's Party) forced him to resign. He previously had served as president of the Parliament of the Balearic Islands from 19 June 1991 to 21 July 1995. On 1 September 2014 he left the party. In April 2015 he was named president of the Assemblea Sobiranista de Mallorca (Souverainist Assembly of Mallorca), position he held until 12 April 2018 when a new president was elected.

== Solerism ==
Solerism was a faction within the People's Party of the Balearic Islands between 1995 and 1996 that followed Cristòfol Soler.

Soler achieved the presidency after Gabriel Cañellas was forced to resign due to a corruption scandal. At first, he followed the ideals of his predecessor, however he was more keen on the importance of the Catalan language and the environment, as well as talking to the opposition and the civil society.

This turn earned him the disapproval of multiple members within his party. In May 1996 the major factions of the party called for a motion of no confidence, forcing him to resign.

== 2014 resignation ==
On 1 September 2014, he presented his letter of resignation to the party due to the new ideology of the party under José Ramón Bauzá.

He specifically mentions the "disparagement towards the identifying elements of [the] country" and the lack of commitment within the party to rectify its politics. He stated that the reasons for his resignation were many and that the leadership of the party caused him "a discomfort every time more obvious". He criticised the acts of the party and argued that the past few years had been characterised by a "fierce clash" against culture and language. "Very important elements of our people […] which, if not respected, leave no other meaning to our self-governance". He ends by acknowledging "At the time, I don't think there is any intention of rectifying these politics, thus I consider it is inevitable that I resign from the party as soon as possible".

== Souverainist Assembly of Mallorca ==
In April 2015, Soler was elected president of the Souverainist Assembly of Mallorca (ASM), a civic platform born in 2014 that has worked towards the inspiration of a souverainist candidacy for the Balearic Islands, and pushes for independence from Spain. They contested in the 2016 Spanish general election under the coalition Sovereignty for the Isles. The results were 7,413 votes in the Balearic Islands district, meaning a 1.6% of the vote share and no seats.
