= Biel Vicens =

Spanish footballer (born 2004)

Personal information
- Full name: Biel Vicens Ponsatí
- Date of birth: 26 July 2004 (age 22)
- Place of birth: Palamós, Spain
- Height: 1.75 m (5 ft 9 in)
- Position: Midfielder

Team information
- Current team: Barcelona B

Youth career
- Palamós
- Girona
- 2018–2023: Barcelona

Senior career*
Years	Team	Apps	(Gls)
2023–	Barcelona B	1	(0)
2024–2025	→ Gimnàstic (loan)	2	(0)
2025	Sant Andreu	7	(0)
- * Club domestic league appearances and goals as of 16 July 2025

Biel Vicens Ponsatí (born 26 July 2004) is a Spanish footballer who plays as a midfielder for FC Barcelona Atlètic.

== Early life ==
Vicens was born in Sant Antoni de Calonge, Girona, Catalonia.

== Career ==
On 30 August 2024, Vicens joined Gimnàstic in Primera Federación on a season-long loan.

== Style of play ==
Vicens has received comparisons to Netherlands international Frenkie de Jong.

== Personal life ==
Vicens is the older brother of Spanish footballer Nil Vicens.
