= Gabriel Cañellas =

Spanish politician

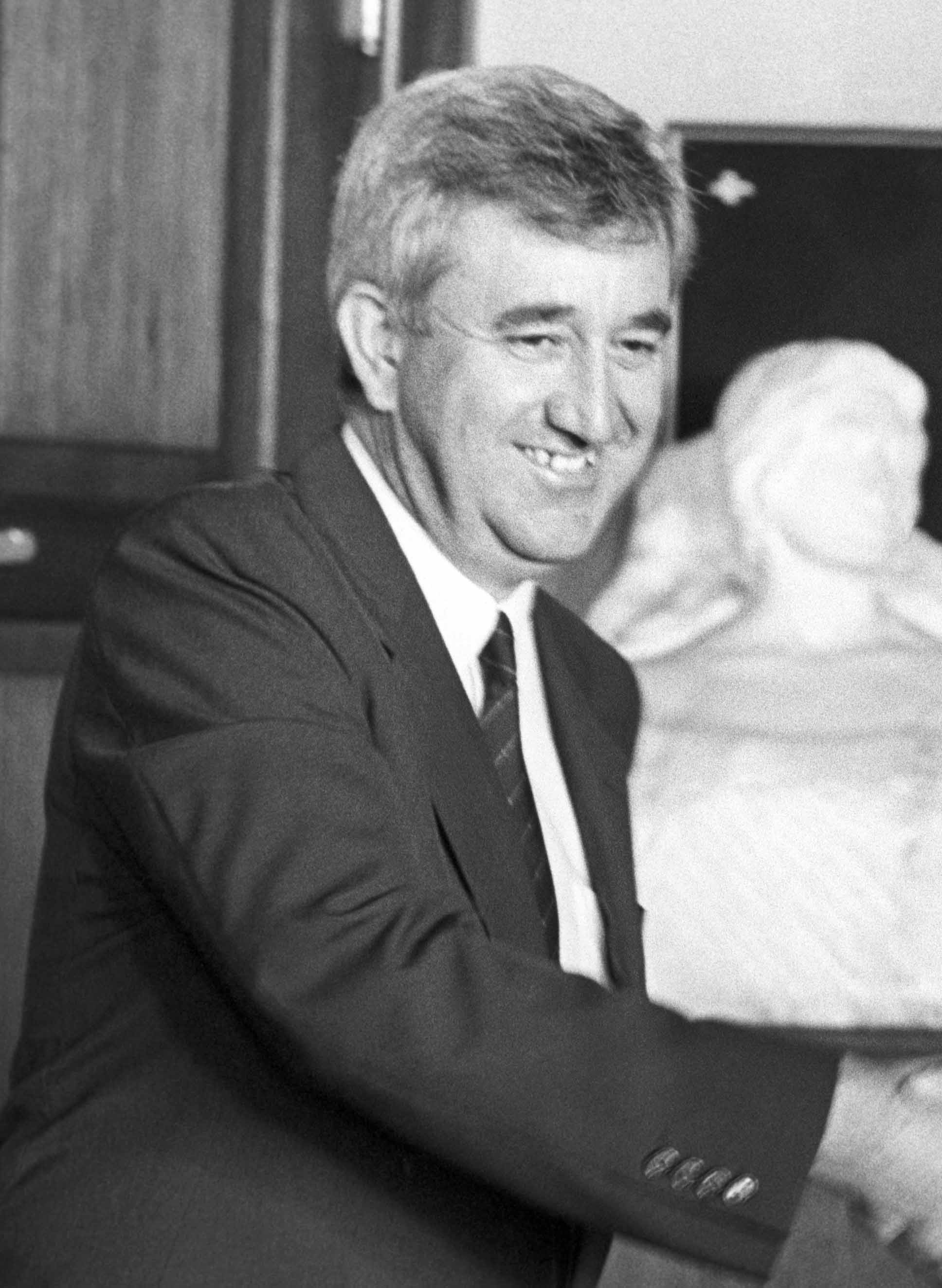

President of the Government of the Balearic Islands
- In office 10 June 1983 – 30 June 1995
- Monarch: Juan Carlos I
- Deputy: Joan Huguet (1983–91); Rosa Estaràs (1991–95)
- Preceded by: Francesc Tutzó
- Succeeded by: Cristòfol Soler

Personal details
- Born: Gabriel Cañellas Fons; 1941 (age 84–85) Palma de Mallorca, Spain
- Party: People's Alliance; People's Party
- Education: University of Valladolid

Gabriel Cañellas Fons (Catalan: [gəbɾiˈɛl kəˈɲeʎəs ˈfɔns]; born 1941 in Palma, Majorca) is a Spanish politician. He was President of the Balearic Islands from 1983 to 1995.
