= Socialist Party of Mallorca =

Socialist Party of Mallorca Partit Socialista de Mallorca
- Secretary-General: Bel Busquets
- Founded: December 1977
- Dissolved: 2023
- Preceded by: Socialist Party of the Islands
- Merged into: Més per Mallorca
- Headquarters: C/ Isidoro Antillón, 9, baixos 07006 Palma, Mallorca
- Ideology: Democratic socialism Green politics Catalan nationalism
- Regional affiliation: Més per Mallorca (since 2013); PSM–Nationalist Agreement (1998–2015); Bloc for Mallorca (2006–2011)
- European affiliation: European Free Alliance

Website
- psm-entesa.cat

The Socialist Party of Mallorca (Catalan: Partit Socialista de Mallorca, PSM; IPA: [pəɾˈtit sosi.əˈlistə ðə məˈʎɔɾkə]), officially PSM–Entesa after the incorporation of Entesa per Mallorca (ExM) in February 2013, was a political party in Mallorca, Spain. The PSM defined itself as socialist, environmentalist, and Catalan nationalist, from a Mallorcan point of view. The party fully dissolved itself within Més per Mallorca starting in 2018.

== Ideology ==
It advocates the self-determination and the freedom of the Balearic Islands, with social justice, to increase the identity and the self-government of the archipelago. It also calls for a closer relationship with the other Catalan Countries, now forbidden to be achieved in a confederation of three Spanish autonomous communities by the Spanish constitution(art.145). Therefore, its political ascription is a Mallorcan political party, regionalist or progressive-stateless nationalist, environmental, socialist and democratic.

== History ==
The PSM emerged from the Socialist Party of the Islands (PSI) in December 1977. Unlike most of the other Spanish socialist parties, the PSI refused to join the Spanish Socialist Workers' Party (PSOE).

In 1989, it strengthened an alliance with Socialist Party of Menorca (PSMe) and Nationalist and Ecologist Agreement of Ibiza (ENE), gathering together other local progressive and nationalist parties. The name of the alliance was Nationalist Left of the Balearic Islands Federation (EN), renamed in 1998 as PSM–Nationalist Agreement (PSM–EN). Its representation in the Parliament of the Balearic Islands was between 7% and 15% of the votes.

Usually as an opposition party, PSM was part of the Government of the Island Council of Mallorca from 1995 until 2003 and from 2007 until 2011, and of the Government of the Balearic Islands from 1999 until 2003 and from 2007 until 2011.

In the 2004 general election, PSM took part in a coalition in the Balearic Islands with United Left (EUIB), The Greens (EV), and Republican Left (ERC), as Progressives for the Balearic Islands. This coalition obtained 40,289 votes (12%). However, no representation in the Cortes Generales was obtained.

In 2007, this coalition was enlarged, forming the new coalition Bloc for Mallorca (Bloc). The coalition got 4 MPs (14%) in the Balearic Parliament (2 of them from the PSM). After negotiations, PSM and the other Bloc's parties decided to enter the autonomous government, with Socialist Party of the Balearic Islands (PSIB) and Mallorcan Union (UM), leaving the People's Party (PP) in the opposition.

In 2008, the party decided to change its allies for the general election to UM, ERC and ExM. The coalition refused to join with EUIB. However, 29% of the members wanted to follow the former alliance with EUIB and EV. Most of them were members of the PSM–Left Nationalist Youth. With less than 30,000 votes, no representation in the Cortes Generales was obtained. Also in 2008, the PSM became a full member of the European Free Alliance (EFA).

In 2011, the Bloc broke and the party decided to form an electoral coalition with IniciativaVerds (IV) and ExM for the regional election. The coalition got 36,149 votes and 4 seats in the Parliament. Later that year, the coalition was enlarged by the addition of the new ecologist party eQuo, and participated in the 2011 general election, getting 31,378 votes and no representation.

In March 2016, Bel Busquets was elected Secretary General, in substitution of Biel Barceló. In December 2018, the party was "frozen" and its political activities were transferred to Més per Mallorca (Més).

== Electoral performance ==
=== Parliament of the Balearic Islands ===
Parliament of the Balearic Islands
| Election | Vote | % | Seats | Status | Leader |
| 1983 | 16,979 (#4) | 5.46 | 2 / 59 | Opposition | Sebastià Serra |
| 1987 | 16,383 (#5) | 4.88 | 2 / 59 | Opposition | Sebastià Serra |
| 1991 | 22,522 (#3) | 6.64 | 3 / 59 | Opposition | Mateu Morro |
| 1995 | 41,242 (#3) | 10.98 | 5 / 59 | Opposition | Pere Sampol |
| 1999 | 39,509 (#3) | 10.83 | 4 / 59 | Government | Pere Sampol |
| 2003 | 30,964 (#4) | 7.26 | 3 / 59 | Opposition | Pere Sampol |
| 2007 | with Bloc | – | 2 / 59 | Government | Gabriel Barceló |
| 2011 | with PSM–IV–ExM | – | 3 / 59 | Opposition | Gabriel Barceló |
| 2015 | with Més | – | 4 / 59 | Government | Gabriel Barceló |
| 2019 | with Més | – | 3 / 59 | Confidence and supply | Miquel Ensenyat |

== Congress of Deputies candidates ==
- 1977: Francesc Obrador (with the Unitat Socialista coalition)
- 1982: Joan Perelló
- 1986: Mateu Morro
- 1989: Enric Ribas
- 1993: Sebastià Serra
- 1996: Maria Antònia Vadell
- 2000: Cecili Buele
- 2004: Nanda Ramon (with the Progressistes per les Illes Balears coalition)
- 2008: Pere Sampol (with the Unitat per les Illes coalition)
- 2011: Miquel Ensenyat (with the PSM-IniciativaVerds-Entesa-EQUO coalition)
- 2015: Antoni Verger (Més per Mallorca coalition)
- 2016: Antoni Verger (Units Podem Més coalition)
