= Pere Sampol =

Spanish politician (1951–2025)

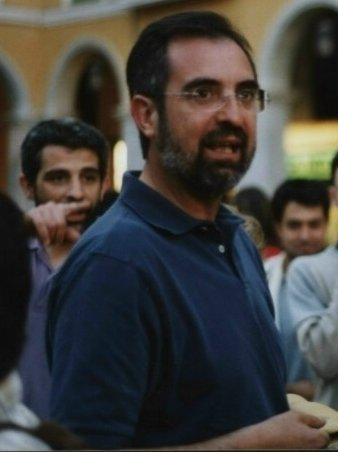
Sampol in 2002

Pere Sampol Mas (16 September 1951 – 25 April 2025) was a Spanish engineer and politician from the Socialist Party of Majorca who served as a Senator between 2007 and 2011, and Vicepresident of the Balearic Islands between 1999 and 2003. He was also member of the Parliament of the Balearic Islands between 1991 and 2006. Sampol died on 25 April 2025, at the age of 73.
