= Independent Popular Council of Formentera =

Independent Popular Council of Formentera Agrupació Independent Popular de Formentera
- Founded: 1989
- Dissolved: 2011
- Succeeded by: Sa Unió de Formentera
- Ideology: Conservatism
- Political position: Centre-right

The Independent Popular Council of Formentera (Catalan: Agrupació Independent Popular de Formentera, AIPF) was a conservative political party on the island of Formentera, Spain. In 2011 the party was refounded as Sa Unió de Formentera.
