= People's Party of the Balearic Islands =

People's Party of the Balearic Islands Partido Popular de las Islas Baleares Partit Popular de les Illes Balears
- President: Marga Prohens
- Founded: 1989
- Headquarters: C/ Palau Reial, 14; Palma, Majorca, Spain
- Ideology: Conservatism; Christian democracy Regionalism
- Political position: Centre-right to right-wing
- National affiliation: People's Party
- Parliament of the Balearic Islands: 25 / 59
- Local seats in the Balearic Islands: 357 / 945
- Congress of Deputies(Balearic seats): 3 / 8
- Senate of Spain(Balearic seats): 3 / 7

Website
- www.ppbalears.es

The People's Party of the Balearic Islands (Spanish: Partido Popular de las Islas Baleares, Catalan: Partit Popular de les Illes Balears, PP) is the regional section of the People's Party of Spain (PP) in the Balearic Islands. It was formed in 1989 from the re-foundation of the People's Alliance.

== Presidents ==
	President	Term
1.	Gabriel Cañellas	1989–1995
2.	Cristòfol Soler	1995–1996
3.	Jaume Matas	1996–2007
4.	Rosa Estaràs	2007–2009
5.	José Ramón Bauzà	2009–2015
6.	Miquel Vidal	2015–2017
7.	Biel Company	2017–

== Electoral performance ==
=== Parliament of the Balearic Islands ===
Parliament of the Balearic Islands
Election	Vote	%	Score	Seats	+/–	Leader	Status in legislature	
Election	Vote	%	Score	Seats	+/–	Leader	Status	Period
1991 (Note: Electoral alliance with Majorcan Union.)	160,512	47.32%	1st	31 / 59	2 (Note: Compared to the combined totals of People's Alliance–Liberal Party and Majorcan Union in the 1987 regional election.)	Gabriel Cañellas	Majority coalition (PP–UM)	1991–1995
1995	168,156	44.77%	1st	31 / 59	0	Gabriel Cañellas	Majority government	1995–1999
1999	160,545	44.01%	1st	28 / 59	3	Jaume Matas	Opposition	1999–2003
2003	190,562	44.70%	1st	30 / 59	2	Jaume Matas	Majority government	2003–2007
2007	192,577	46.02%	1st	29 / 59	1	Jaume Matas	Opposition	2007–2011
2011	194,861	46.36%	1st	35 / 59	7	José Ramón Bauzà	Majority government	2011–2015
2015	123,183	28.52%	1st	20 / 59	15	José Ramón Bauzà	Opposition	2015–2023
2019	95,295	22.20%	2nd	16 / 59	4	Biel Company	Opposition	2015–2023
2023	161,267	35.79%	1st	25 / 59	9	Marga Prohens	Minority government	2023–present

=== Cortes Generales ===
Cortes Generales
Election	Balearic Islands						
Election	Congress					Senate	
Election	Vote	%	Score	Seats	+/–	Seats	+/–
1989	140,163	40.66%	1st	3 / 6	0 (Note: Compared to People's Coalition totals in the 1986 general election.)	4 / 5	2
1993	191,461	46.41%	1st	4 / 7	1	4 / 5	0
1996	194,859	45.13%	1st	4 / 7	0	3 / 5	1
2000	214,348	53.87%	1st	5 / 7	1	4 / 5	1
2004	215,737	45.89%	1st	4 / 8	1	4 / 5	0
2008	208,246	43.97%	2nd	4 / 8	0	2 / 5	2
2011	217,327	49.59%	1st	5 / 8	1	4 / 5	2
2015	140,640	29.06%	1st	3 / 8	2	4 / 5	0
2016	163,045	35.08%	1st	3 / 8	0	4 / 5	0
2019 (Apr)	87,352	16.85%	4th	1 / 8	2	1 / 5	3
2019 (Nov)	103,493	22.86%	2nd	2 / 8	1	2 / 5	1
