= Jaume Matas =

Spanish politician

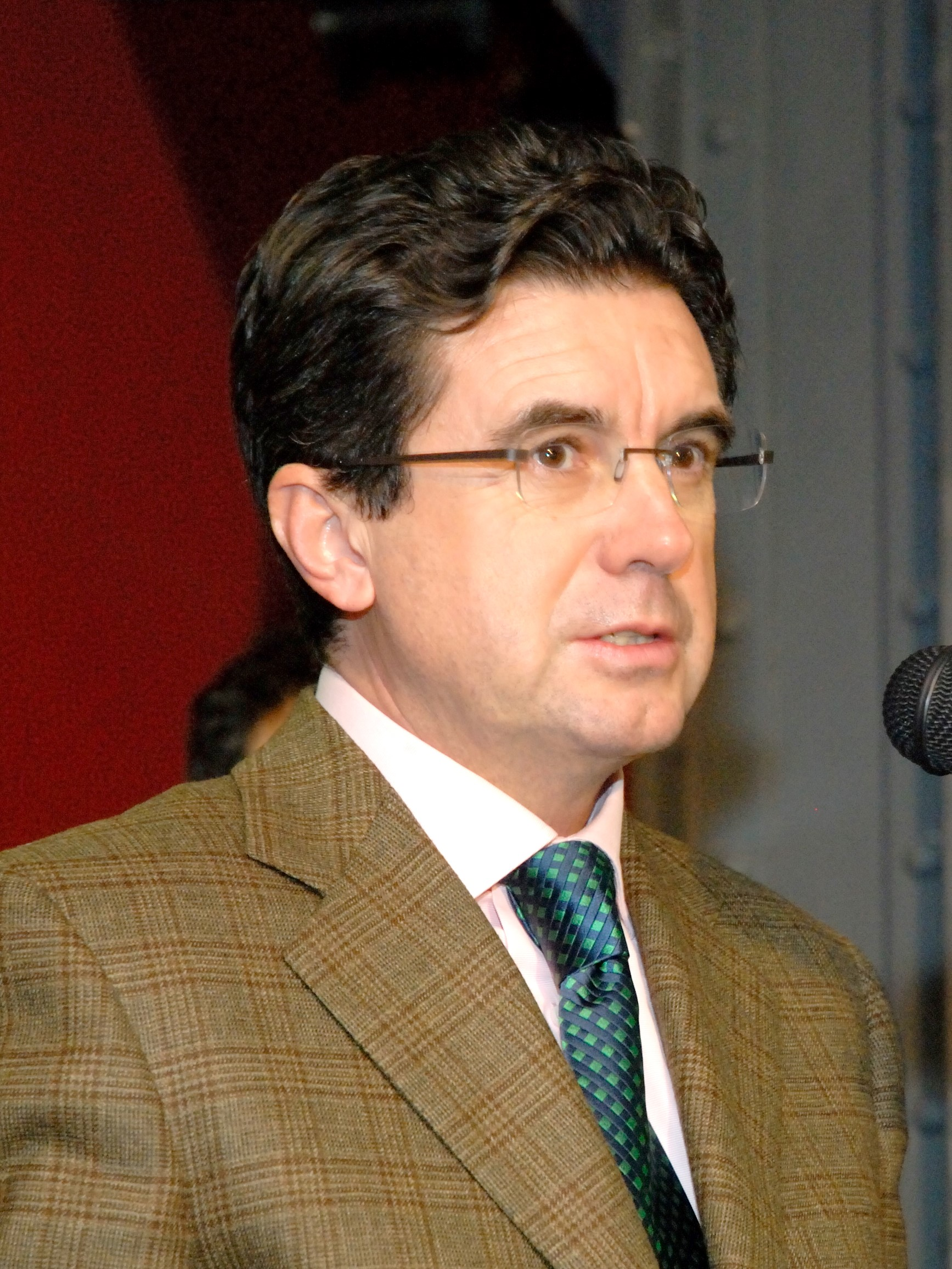

President of the Government of the Balearic Islands
- In office 26 June 2003 – 5 July 2007
- Monarch: Juan Carlos I
- Deputy: Rosa Estaràs
- Preceded by: Francesc Antich
- Succeeded by: Francesc Antich
- In office 17 June 1996 – 26 July 1999
- Deputy: Rosa Estaràs
- Preceded by: Cristòfol Soler
- Succeeded by: Francesc Antich

Minister of the Environment
- In office 14 April 2000 – 18 April 2003
- Preceded by: Isabel Tocino
- Succeeded by: Elvira Rodríguez

Personal details
- Born: Jaume Matas i Palou; 5 October 1956 (age 69) Palma de Mallorca, Spain
- Party: People's Party
- Education: University of Valencia

Jaume Matas Palou (Catalan: [ˈʒawmə ˈmatəs i pəˈlɔw]; born 5 October 1956 in Palma, Majorca) is a Spanish politician. He was President of the Balearic Islands from 1996 to 1999 and from 2003 to 2007. In March 2012 Matas was sentenced to six years' imprisonment for fraud.
