= Majorcan Union =

Majorcan Union Unió Mallorquina
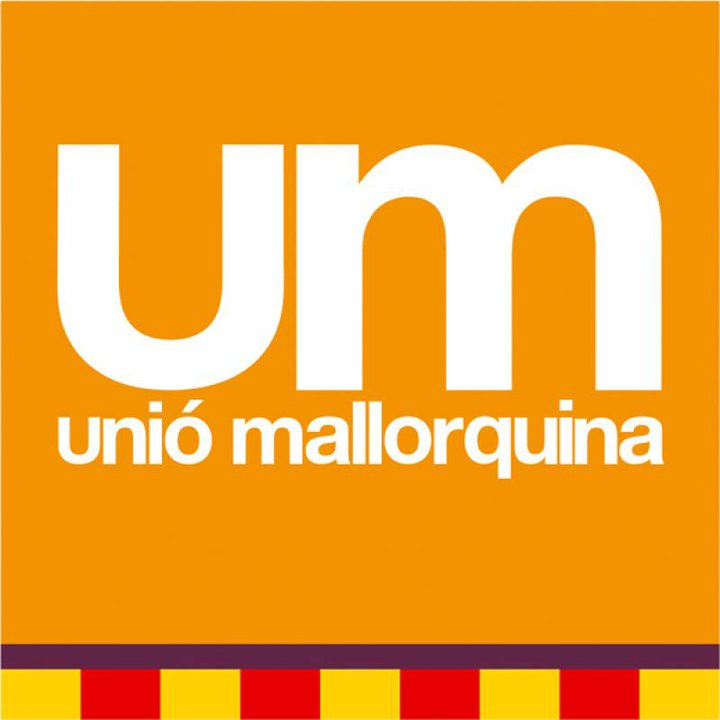
- Leader: Josep Melià Ques
- Founded: October 1982
- Dissolved: February 2011
- Headquarters: C/ Sindicat, 21; 07002 Palma de Mallorca
- Ideology: Liberalism; Nationalism
- Political position: Centre-right
- International affiliation: Liberal International
- Colours: Blue; Orange

Majorcan Union (Catalan: Unió Mallorquina, UM; IPA: [uniˈo məʎuɾˈkinə]) was a regional liberal party on the island of Mallorca, Spain. It was founded in October 1982, as a nationalist continuation of the then disintegrating Union of the Democratic Centre (UCD). The main founder was Jeroni Albertí Picornell.

In 1993 it merged with the Unió Independent de Mallorca and Convergència Balear. Subsequently, it forged alliances with Independents per Menorca and Unió Centristes de Menorca.

As a centre party, it supported People's Party governments (1987) in the Balearic Islands but also the left-wing coalition, led by the socialist Francesc Antich (Spanish Socialist Workers' Party, PSOE), which replaced the People's Party in 1999. UM was once again was the key element in returning the presidency to Francesc Antich after the regional elections to the Balearic Island parliament held in 2007.

Unió Mallorquina was a member of Liberal International. The last president was Josep Melià i Ques

Following a number of corruption scandals, the party decided to disband in February 2011 and establish a new party, Convergence for the Isles (Convergència per les Illes).

== Electoral performance ==
=== Parliament of the Balearic Islands ===
| Date | Votes | | | Seats | | Status | Size | Notes |
| Date | # | % | ±pp | # | ± | Status | Size | Notes |
|---|---|---|---|---|---|---|---|---|
| 1983 | 46,915 | 15.1% | – | 6 / 54 | – | Opposition | 3rd | government support |
| 1987 | 30,247 | 9.0% | –6.1 | 4 / 59 | 2 | Government | 4th | |
| 1991 | 130,275 | 38.4% | N/A | 4 / 59 | 0 | Government | * | |
| 1995 | 19,966 | 5.3% | – | 2 / 59 | 2 | Opposition | 5th | |
| 1999 | 26,682 | 7.3% | +2.0 | 3 / 59 | 1 | Government | 4th | |
| 2003 | 31,781 | 7.4% | +0.1 | 3 / 59 | 0 | Opposition | 4th | |
| 2007 | 28,178 | 6.7% | –0.7 | 3 / 59 | 0 | Government | 4th | |

- * Within People's Party–Majorcan Union

== See also ==
- Liberalism
- Contributions to liberal theory
- Liberalism worldwide
- List of liberal parties
- Liberal democracy
- Liberalism in Spain
