= Francesc Antich =

Venezuelan-born Spanish politician (1958–2025)

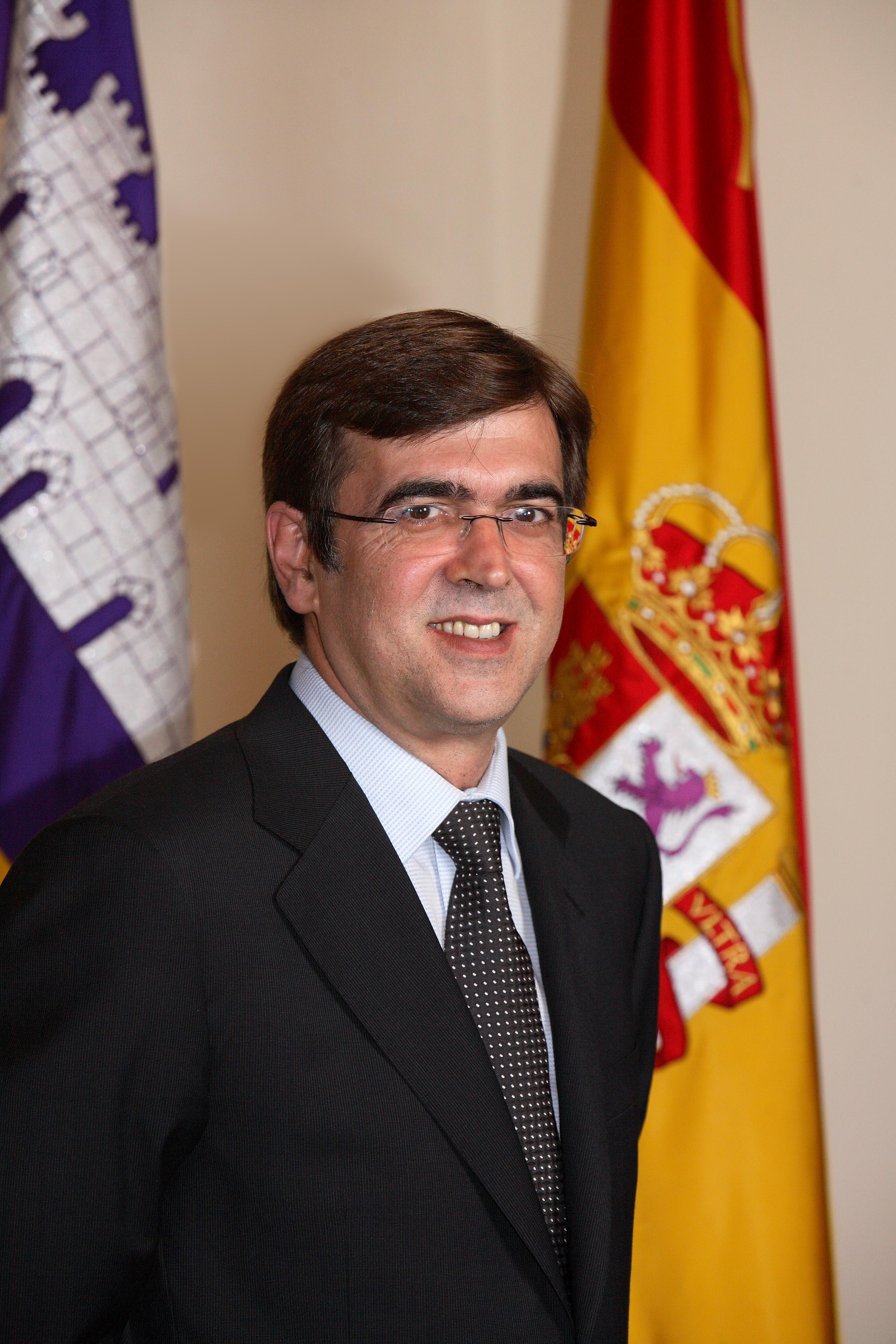

President of the Government of the Balearic Islands
- In office 6 July 2007 – 18 June 2011
- Monarch: Juan Carlos I
- Preceded by: Jaume Matas
- Succeeded by: José Ramón Bauzá
- In office 29 June 1999 – 23 June 2003
- Preceded by: Jaume Matas
- Succeeded by: Jaume Matas

Secretary General of the Socialist Party of the Balearic Islands
- In office 9 November 1998 – 26 February 2012
- Preceded by: Andreu Crespí
- Succeeded by: Francina Armengol

Mayor of Algaida
- In office 18 June 1991 – 29 November 1997
- Preceded by: Esteve Vanrell
- Succeeded by: Jaume Jaume

Member of the Congress of Deputies
- In office 2 April 2004 – 4 June 2007
- Constituency: Balearic Islands

Member of the Senate
- In office 21 June 2011 – 11 July 2019
- Appointed by: Parliament of the Balearic Islands

Member of the Parliament of the Balearic Islands
- In office 26 June 2007 – 20 June 2011
- Constituency: Mallorca
- In office 29 September 1992 – 17 March 2004
- Constituency: Mallorca

Personal details
- Born: Francesc Antich Oliver; 28 November 1958 Caracas, Venezuela
- Died: 2 January 2025 (aged 66) Mallorca, Spain
- Party: Spanish Socialist Workers' Party
- Occupation: Politician

Francesc Antich Oliver (Balearic Catalan: [fɾənˈsəsk ənˈtik oliˈve]; 28 November 1958 – 2 January 2025) was a Venezuelan-born Spanish politician, who was the President of the Balearic Islands between 1999 and 2003, and 2007 and 2011. He also was the Secretary General of the Socialist Party of the Balearic Islands, a branch of the SSWP. Antich was born in Caracas on 28 November 1958, to Spanish emigrants from Venezuela. He died from cancer on 2 January 2025, at the age of 66.
