= Rosa Estaràs =

Spanish politician

Rosa Estaràs MEP
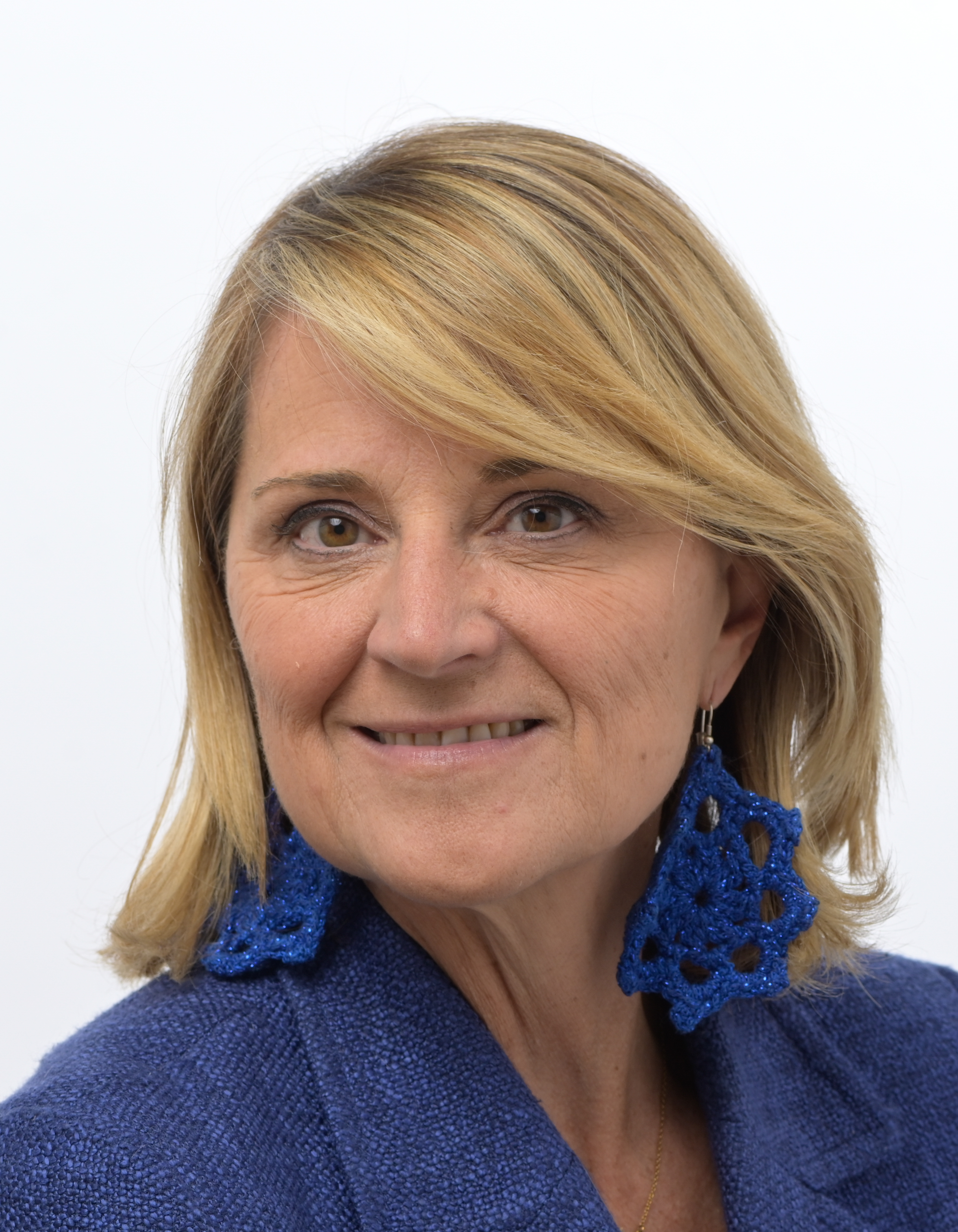

Member of the European Parliament for Spain
- Incumbent
- Assumed office 14 July 2009

Personal details
- Born: María Rosa Estaràs Ferragut; 21 October 1965 (age 60) Valldemosa, Balearic Islands, Spain
- Party: People's Party
- Occupation: Politician

María Rosa Estaràs Ferragut (Spanish pronunciation: [ˈrosa estaˈɾas]; born 21 October 1965) is a Spanish politician and current Member of the European Parliament (MEP). She is a member of the People's Party.

== Member of the European Parliament, 2009–present ==
In the 2009 European elections, Estaràs was elected as Member of the European Parliament. She currently serves as vice-chairwoman of the Committee on Petitions and as full member of the Committee on Legal Affairs. She is also a member of the parliament's delegation to the ACP–EU Joint Parliamentary Assembly.

In addition to her committee assignments, Estaràs is a member of the European Parliament Intergroup on Artificial Intelligence and Digital, the European Parliament Intergroup on Seas, Rivers, Islands and Coastal Areas; the European Parliament Intergroup on LGBT Rights; the European Parliament Intergroup on Disability and the MEP Alliance for Mental Health.
