= Socialist Party of the Balearic Islands =

Socialist Party of the Balearic Islands Partit Socialista de les Illes Balears (ca) Partido Socialista de las Islas Baleares (es)
- President: Teresa Riera
- Secretary-General: Francina Armengol
- Spokesperson: Pilar Costa
- Founded: 1913 (as Balearic Socialist Federation)
- Headquarters: C/ Miracle, 1; 07002 Palma, Majorca, Spain
- Membership (2014): 2,542
- Ideology: Social democracy Federalism; Catalanism
- Political position: Centre-left
- National affiliation: Spanish Socialist Workers' Party
- Congress of Deputies: 2 / 8 (Balearic seats)
- Spanish Senate: 3 / 7 (Balearic seats)
- Parliament of the Balearic Islands: 19 / 59
- Island Councils: 25 / 78
- Mayors in the Balearic Islands: 12 / 68
- Local seats in the Balearic Islands (Note: Excluding coalitions.): 207 / 925

Website
- www.psib-psoe.org

The Socialist Party of the Balearic Islands–PSOE (Catalan: Partit Socialista de les Illes Balears–PSOE) is the regional branch in the Balearic Islands of the Spanish Socialist Workers' Party (PSOE), the main centre-left party in Spain since the 1970s.

== Secretaries-general ==
	President	Term
1.	Francesc Triay	1982–1983
2.	Félix Pons	1983–1985
3.	Josep Moll	1985–1990
4.	Joan March	1990–1994
–	Francesc Triay	1994–1997
6.	Andreu Crespí	1997–2000
7.	Francesc Antich	2000–2011
8.	Francina Armengol	2011–

== Electoral performance ==
=== Parliament of the Balearic Islands ===
Parliament of the Balearic Islands
Election	Votes	%	#	Seats	+/–	Leading candidate	Status in legislature
1983	107,906	34.71%	2nd	21 / 54	—	Félix Pons	Opposition
1987	108,910	32.47%	2nd	21 / 59	0	Joan Francesc Triay	Opposition
1991	102,060	30.09%	2nd	21 / 59	0	Francesc Obrador	Opposition
1995	90,008	23.97%	2nd	16 / 59	5	Joan Francesc Triay	Opposition
1999	80,327	22.02%	2nd	16 / 59	0	Francesc Antich	Coalition
2003	104,614	24.54%	2nd	18 / 59	2	Francesc Antich	Opposition
2007	115,477	27.60%	2nd	20 / 59	2	Francesc Antich	Coalition
2011	102,724	24.44%	2nd	17 / 59	3	Francesc Antich	Opposition
2015	81,798	18.94%	2nd	14 / 59	3	Francina Armengol	Coalition
2019	117,480	27.37%	1st	19 / 59	5	Francina Armengol	Coalition
2023	119,540	26.53%	2nd	18 / 59	1	Francina Armengol	Opposition

=== Cortes Generales ===
Cortes Generales
Election	Balearic Islands						
Election	Congress					Senate	
Election	Votes	%	#	Seats	+/–	Seats	+/–
1977	73,554	23.34%	2nd	2 / 6	—	1 / 5	—
1979	88,232	29.38%	2nd	2 / 6	0	1 / 5	0
1982	144,232	40.45%	1st	3 / 6	1	3 / 5	2
1986	137,363	40.28%	1st	3 / 6	0	3 / 5	0
1989	118,833	34.48%	2nd	3 / 6	0	1 / 5	2
1993	140,145	33.97%	2nd	3 / 7	0	1 / 5	0
1996	155,244	35.95%	2nd	3 / 7	0	2 / 5	1
2000	116,515	29.28%	2nd	2 / 7	1	1 / 5	1
2004	185,623	39.48%	2nd	4 / 8	2	1 / 5	0
2008	209,451	44.23%	1st	4 / 8	0	3 / 5	2
2011	126,512	28.87%	2nd	3 / 8	1	1 / 5	2
2015	88,635	18.31%	3rd	2 / 8	1	0 / 5	1
2016	93,363	20.09%	3rd	2 / 8	0	0 / 5	0
2019 (Apr)	136,698	26.36%	1st	3 / 8	1	4 / 5	4
2019 (Nov)	115,567	25.44%	1st	2 / 8	1	3 / 5	1
2023	151,134	30.14%	2nd	3 / 8	1	1 / 5	2

=== European Parliament ===
European Parliament
Election	Balearic Islands		
Election	Votes	%	#
1987	114,420	34.20%	2nd
1989	84,465	35.58%	1st
1994	72,430	24.85%	2nd
1999	100,023	27.70%	2nd
2004	101,212	38.76%	2nd
2009	99,574	38.66%	2nd
2014	59,518	22.03%	2nd
2019	122,532	29.34%	1st
