= United Left of the Balearic Islands =

United Left of the Balearic Islands Esquerra Unida de les Illes Balears
- General Coordinator: Juan José Martínez Riera
- Founded: 1996; 2010 (refoundation)
- Merger of: Communist Party of the Balearic Islands; Izquierda Abierta; Republican Left; Independents; Socialist Action Party (1995–2001)
- Headquarters: Patronat Obrer, 23 baixos. 07006 Palma de Mallorca
- Ideology: Socialism; Anti-capitalism; Communism; Republicanism; Federalism; Feminism
- Political position: Left-wing
- National affiliation: United Left
- Regional affiliation: Units Podem Més (2016–2019); Sumar Més (2023–2026)
- Island Council of Ibiza: 1 / 13 (Inside the coalition Podemos-Guanyar Eivissa)
- Balearic Parliament: 0 / 59

Website
- euib.org

United Left of the Balearic Islands (Catalan: Esquerra Unida de les Illes Balears, EUIB) is the Balearic federation of the Spanish left wing political and social movement United Left. Juan José Martínez Riera is the current General Coordinator. The Communist Party of the Balearic Islands (PCIB-PCE, Balearic federation of PCE) is the major member of the coalition.

== Organization ==
EUIB has local chapters for each island, although these are not legally separate. The most important are those of Majorca (United Left of Majorca) and Menorca (Left of Menorca).

== See also ==
- Communist Party of the Balearic Islands
