= Menorca (Parliament of the Balearic Islands constituency) =

Coordinates: 39°58′N 4°05′E

- Parliament of the Balearic Islands; Electoral constituency
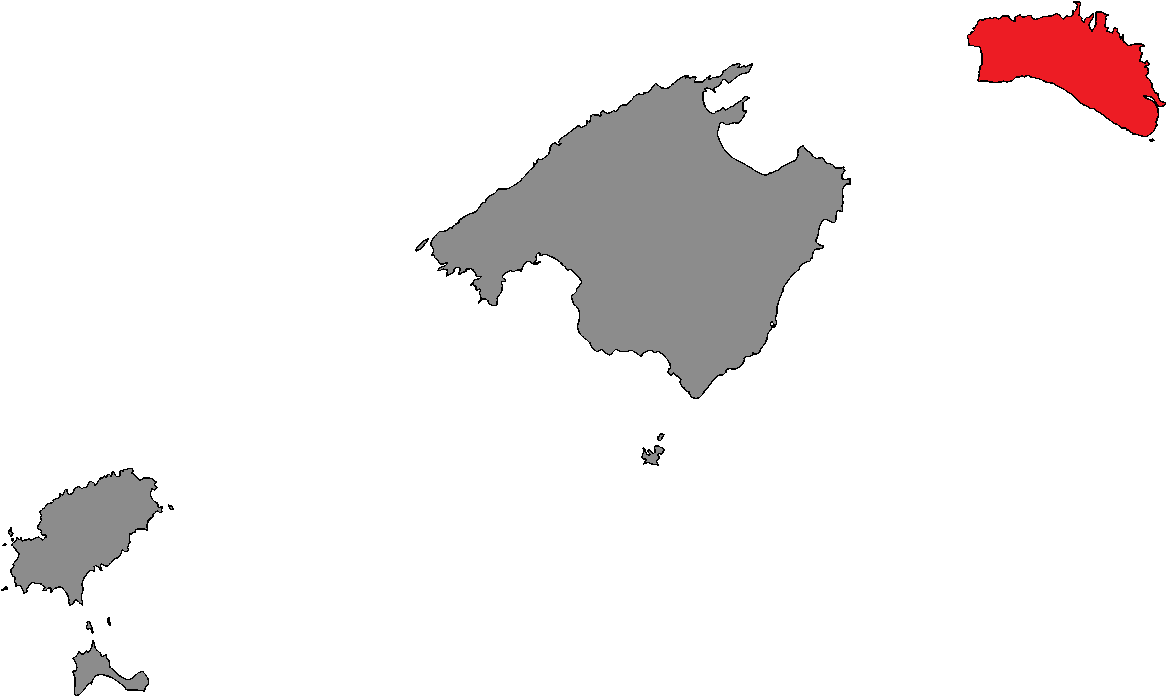
- Location of Menorca within the Balearic Islands
- Island: Menorca
- Autonomous community: Balearic Islands
- Population: ▲100,323 (2024)
- Electorate: ▲74,585 (2023)
- Major settlements: Ciutadella de Menorca, Mahón

Current constituency
- Created: 1983
- Seats: 12 (1983–1987); 13 (1987–present)
- Members: PP (5); PSIB (4); MxMe (2); Vox (1); UP (1)

Menorca (also Minorca) is one of the four constituencies (Spanish: circunscripciones) represented in the Parliament of the Balearic Islands, the regional legislature of the Autonomous Community of the Balearic Islands. The constituency currently elects 13 deputies. Its boundaries correspond to those of the island of Menorca. The electoral system uses the D'Hondt method and closed-list proportional representation, with a minimum threshold of five percent.

Until the 2003 election, the results in this district were also used to determine the composition of the Island Council of Menorca—with the same seats—during the same term as the Parliament. From the 2007 election onwards, a separate election is held. Additionally, on 3 April 1979 the first independent election for the Island Council of Menorca was held, electing 12 councillors.

== Electoral system ==
The constituency was created as per the Statute of Autonomy of the Balearic Islands of 1983 and was first contested in the 1983 regional election. The Statute provided for the four main islands in the Balearic archipelago—Majorca, Menorca, Ibiza and Formentera—to be established as multi-member districts in the Parliament of the Balearic Islands, with this regulation being maintained under the 1986 regional electoral law. Each constituency is allocated a fixed number of seats: 33 for Majorca, 13 for Menorca, 12 for Ibiza and 1 for Formentera. The exception was the 1983 election, when these numbers were 30, 12, 11 and 1, respectively.

Voting is on the basis of universal suffrage, which comprises all nationals over eighteen, registered in the Balearic Islands and in full enjoyment of their political rights. Amendments to the electoral law in 2011 required for Balearic citizens abroad to apply for voting before being permitted to vote, a system known as "begged" or expat vote (Spanish: Voto rogado) which was abolished in 2022. Seats are elected using the D'Hondt method and a closed list proportional representation, with an electoral threshold of five percent of valid votes—which includes blank ballots; until a 1995 reform, the threshold was set at three percent—being applied in each constituency. The use of the D'Hondt method may result in a higher effective threshold, depending on the district magnitude.

The electoral law allows for parties and federations registered in the interior ministry, coalitions and groupings of electors to present lists of candidates. Parties and federations intending to form a coalition ahead of an election are required to inform the relevant Electoral Commission within ten days of the election call—fifteen before 1985—whereas groupings of electors need to secure the signature of at least one percent of the electorate in the constituencies for which they seek election—one-thousandth of the electorate, with a compulsory minimum of 500 signatures, until 1985—disallowing electors from signing for more than one list of candidates.

== Deputies ==
Deputies 1983–present
Key to parties EM–EU Podemos–EUIB Podemos/Podem PSM–EU PSM MxMe PSIB–PSOE CIM CDS Cs PP CP AP–PL Vox
Parliament	Election	Distribution
1st	1983	2 / 5 / 1 / 4
2nd	1987	2 / 5 / 1 / 5
3rd	1991	2 / 5 / 6
4th	1995	1 / 1 / 4 / 7
5th	1999	1 / 1 / 5 / 6
6th	2003	1 / 6 / 6
7th	2007	1 / 6 / 6
8th	2011	1 / 4 / 8
9th	2015	2 / 3 / 3 / 5
10th	2019	2 / 2 / 4 / 1 / 4
11th	2023	1 / 2 / 4 / 5 / 1

== Regional elections ==
=== 2023 ===
Summary of the 28 May 2023 Parliament of the Balearic Islands election results in Menorca
Parties and alliances	Popular vote			Seats	
Parties and alliances	Votes	%	±pp	Total	+/−
People's Party (PP)	15,080	38.71	+12.01	5	+1
Socialist Party of the Balearic Islands (PSIB–PSOE)	10,413	26.73	–1.13	4	±0
More for Menorca (MxMe)	6,486	16.65	+1.22	2	±0
Vox (Vox)	2,790	7.16	+4.15	1	+1
United We Can (EUIB–Podemos)	2,631	6.75	–4.57	1	–1
Citizens–Party of the Citizenry (CS)	545	1.40	–8.36	0	–1
Spanish Liberal Project (PLIE)	158	0.41	+0.16	0	±0
Blank ballots	857	2.20	+0.81		
Total	38,960			13	±0
Valid votes	38,960	98.37	–0.82		
Invalid votes	644	1.63	+0.82		
Votes cast / turnout	39,604	53.10	–3.12		
Abstentions	34,981	46.90	+3.12		
Registered voters	74,585				

=== 2019 ===
Summary of the 26 May 2019 Parliament of the Balearic Islands election results in Menorca
Parties and alliances	Popular vote			Seats	
Parties and alliances	Votes	%	±pp	Total	+/−
Socialist Party of the Balearic Islands (PSIB–PSOE)	10,940	27.86	+5.36	4	+1
People's Party (PP)	10,484	26.70	–4.03	4	–1
More for Menorca (MxMe)	6,058	15.43	–2.07	2	–1
United We Can (Podemos–EUIB)^{1}	4,445	11.32	–6.35	2	±0
Citizens–Party of the Citizenry (Cs)^{2}	3,832	9.76	+4.61	1	+1
Vox–Citizen Alternative for Tolerance, Unity and Action (Vox–ACTUA Baleares)	1,181	3.01	New	0	±0
El Pi–Proposal for the Isles (El Pi)	1,029	2.62	–0.63	0	±0
Animalist Party Against Mistreatment of Animals (PACMA)	504	1.28	New	0	±0
Act (PACT)	151	0.38	New	0	±0
Spanish Liberal Project (PLIE)	99	0.25	New	0	±0
Blank ballots	545	1.39	–1.23		
Total	39,268			13	±0
Valid votes	39,268	99.19	+0.79		
Invalid votes	322	0.81	–0.79		
Votes cast / turnout	39,590	56.22	–0.60		
Abstentions	30,828	43.78	+0.60		
Registered voters	70,418				
Sources
Footnotes: ^{1} United We Can results are compared to the combined totals of We Can and Left of Menorca–United Left in the 2015 election.; ^{2} Citizens–Party of the Citizenry results are compared to Citizens of Menorca–Ciutadella de Menorca People's Union totals in the 2015 election.

=== 2015 ===
Summary of the 24 May 2015 Parliament of the Balearic Islands election results in Menorca
Parties and alliances	Popular vote			Seats	
Parties and alliances	Votes	%	±pp	Total	+/−
People's Party (PP)	11,557	30.73	–15.37	5	–3
Socialist Party of the Balearic Islands (PSIB–PSOE)	8,461	22.50	–4.60	3	–1
More for Menorca (MpM)^{1}	6,582	17.50	+5.98	3	+2
We Can (Podemos/Podem)	5,208	13.85	New	2	+2
Citizens of Menorca–Ciutadella de Menorca People's Union (CMe–UPCM)	1,938	5.15	+3.81	0	±0
Left of Menorca–United Left (EM–EU)	1,437	3.82	–0.31	0	±0
El Pi–Proposal for the Isles (El Pi)^{2}	1,224	3.25	+0.70	0	±0
Zero Cuts Menorca (Recortes Cero)	207	0.55	New	0	±0
Blank ballots	985	2.62	–0.74		
Total	37,599			13	±0
Valid votes	37,599	98.40	+0.09		
Invalid votes	610	1.60	–0.09		
Votes cast / turnout	38,209	56.82	–2.16		
Abstentions	29,037	43.18	+2.16		
Registered voters	67,246				
Sources
Footnotes: ^{1} More for Menorca results are compared to the combined totals of Socialist Party of Menorca–Nationalist Agreement and The Greens of Menorca in the 2011 election.; ^{2} El Pi–Proposal for the Isles results are compared to Menorcan Union totals in the 2011 election.

=== 2011 ===
Summary of the 22 May 2011 Parliament of the Balearic Islands election results in Menorca
Parties and alliances	Popular vote			Seats	
Parties and alliances	Votes	%	±pp	Total	+/−
People's Party (PP)	17,479	46.10	+3.08	8	+2
Socialist Party of the Balearic Islands (PSIB–PSOE)	10,276	27.10	–11.32	4	–2
Socialist Party of Menorca–Nationalist Agreement (PSM–EN)	3,723	9.82	+0.86	1	±0
Left of Menorca–United Left (EM–EU)	1,567	4.13	–0.57	0	±0
Menorcan Union (UMe)^{1}	968	2.55	+0.68	0	±0
Citizens for Blank Votes (CenB)	857	2.26	+1.50	0	±0
The Greens of Menorca (EV–Me)	645	1.70	New	0	±0
Ciutadella de Menorca People's Union (UPCM)	509	1.34	New	0	±0
Union, Progress and Democracy (UPyD)	406	1.07	New	0	±0
Anti-Bullfighting Party Against Mistreatment of Animals (PACMA)	127	0.33	New	0	±0
Communist Unification of Spain (UCE)	64	0.17	New	0	±0
Blank ballots	1,296	3.36	+1.10		
Total	37,917			13	±0
Valid votes	37,917	98.31	+1.00		
Invalid votes	651	1.69	–1.00		
Votes cast / turnout	38,568	58.98	+0.27		
Abstentions	26,829	41.02	–0.27		
Registered voters	65,397				
Sources
Footnotes: ^{1} Menorcan Union results are compared to Union of Centrists of Menorca totals in the 2007 election.

=== 2007 ===
Summary of the 27 May 2007 Parliament of the Balearic Islands election results in Menorca
Parties and alliances	Popular vote			Seats	
Parties and alliances	Votes	%	±pp	Total	+/−
People's Party (PP)	15,801	43.02	+3.94	6	±0
Socialist Party of the Balearic Islands (PSIB–PSOE)	14,113	38.42	+1.08	6	±0
PSM–Nationalist Agreement–The Greens of Menorca (PSM–EN, EV–Me)^{1}	3,292	8.96	–2.11	1	±0
Left of Menorca–United Left (EM–EU)	1,728	4.70	–0.09	0	±0
Union of Centrists of Menorca (UCM)	686	1.87	–1.23	0	±0
Citizens for Blank Votes (CenB)	279	0.76	–0.38	0	±0
Blank ballots	830	2.26	+0.69		
Total	36,729			13	±0
Valid votes	36,729	99.31	+0.08		
Invalid votes	254	0.69	–0.08		
Votes cast / turnout	36,983	58.71	–1.91		
Abstentions	26,009	41.29	+1.91		
Registered voters	62,992				
Sources
Footnotes: ^{1} PSM–Nationalist Agreement–The Greens of Menorca results are compared to the combined totals of Socialist Party of Menorca–Nationalist Agreement and The Greens of Menorca in the 2003 election.

=== 2003 ===
Summary of the 25 May 2003 Parliament of the Balearic Islands election results in Menorca
Parties and alliances	Popular vote			Seats	
Parties and alliances	Votes	%	±pp	Total	+/−
People's Party (PP)	14,253	39.08	–1.25	6	±0
Socialist Party of the Balearic Islands (PSIB–PSOE)	13,616	37.34	–0.56	6	+1
Socialist Party of Menorca–Nationalist Agreement (PSM–EN)	2,956	8.11	–1.72	1	±0
Left of Menorca–United Left (EM–EU)	1,747	4.79	–2.46	0	–1
Union of Centrists of Menorca (UCM)	1,129	3.10	New	0	±0
The Greens of Menorca (EV–Me)	1,081	2.96	New	0	±0
Menorcan Party (PMQ)	566	1.55	New	0	±0
Citizens for Blank Votes (CenB)	416	1.14	New	0	±0
Balearic People's Union (UPB)	130	0.36	–1.39	0	±0
Blank ballots	574	1.57	–1.36		
Total	36,468			13	±0
Valid votes	36,468	99.23	+0.18		
Invalid votes	283	0.77	–0.18		
Votes cast / turnout	36,751	60.62	+0.41		
Abstentions	23,873	39.38	–0.41		
Registered voters	60,624				

=== 1999 ===
Summary of the 13 June 1999 Parliament of the Balearic Islands election results in Menorca
Parties and alliances	Popular vote			Seats	
Parties and alliances	Votes	%	±pp	Total	+/−
People's Party (PP)	13,287	40.33	–3.87	6	–1
Socialist Party of the Balearic Islands (PSIB–PSOE)	12,487	37.90	+8.49	5	+1
Socialist Party of Menorca–Nationalist Agreement (PSM–EN)	3,239	9.83	–2.02	1	±0
Left of Menorca–United Left (EM–EU)	2,390	7.25	–1.39	1	±0
Balearic People's Union (UPB)	576	1.75	New	0	±0
Blank ballots	966	2.93	+0.62		
Total	32,945			13	±0
Valid votes	32,945	99.05	–0.17		
Invalid votes	315	0.95	+0.17		
Votes cast / turnout	33,260	60.21	–5.26		
Abstentions	21,982	39.79	+5.26		
Registered voters	55,242				

=== 1995 ===
Summary of the 28 May 1995 Parliament of the Balearic Islands election results in Menorca
Parties and alliances	Popular vote			Seats	
Parties and alliances	Votes	%	±pp	Total	+/−
People's Party (PP)	14,968	44.20	–0.91	7	+1
Socialist Party of the Balearic Islands (PSIB–PSOE)	9,958	29.41	–4.22	4	–1
Socialist Party of Menorca–Nationalists of the Islands (PSM–NI)^{1}	4,013	11.85	–2.24	1	–1
United Left of Menorca (IU)	2,926	8.64	New	1	+1
Independents of Menorca (INME)	987	2.91	New	0	±0
Republican Left of Catalonia (ERC)	228	0.67	New	0	±0
Blank ballots	783	2.31	+1.13		
Total	33,863			13	±0
Valid votes	33,863	99.22	–0.17		
Invalid votes	265	0.78	+0.17		
Votes cast / turnout	34,128	65.47	–0.22		
Abstentions	18,006	34.53	+0.22		
Registered voters	52,134				
Sources
Footnotes: ^{1} Socialist Party of Menorca–Nationalists of the Islands results are compared to Agreement of the Left of Menorca totals in the 1991 election.

=== 1991 ===
Summary of the 25 May 1991 Parliament of the Balearic Islands election results in Menorca
Parties and alliances	Popular vote			Seats	
Parties and alliances	Votes	%	±pp	Total	+/−
People's Party (PP)^{1}	14,901	45.11	+6.21	6	+1
Socialist Party of the Balearic Islands (PSIB–PSOE)	11,109	33.63	–2.07	5	±0
Agreement of the Left of Menorca (PSM–EU)	4,654	14.09	–0.80	2	±0
Democratic and Social Centre (CDS)	1,357	4.11	–5.21	0	–1
Progressive Union of Menorca (UPdeM)	624	1.89	New	0	±0
Blank ballots	390	1.18	–0.03		
Total	33,035			13	±0
Valid votes	33,035	99.39	+0.49		
Invalid votes	204	0.61	–0.49		
Votes cast / turnout	33,239	65.69	+7.19		
Abstentions	17,377	34.33	–7.19		
Registered voters	50,616				
Sources
Footnotes: ^{1} People's Party results are compared to People's Alliance–Liberal Party totals in the 1987 election.

=== 1987 ===
Summary of the 10 June 1987 Parliament of the Balearic Islands election results in Menorca
Parties and alliances	Popular vote			Seats	
Parties and alliances	Votes	%	±pp	Total	+/−
People's Alliance–Liberal Party (AP–PL)^{1}	11,412	38.90	+6.24	5	+1
Spanish Socialist Workers' Party (PSOE)	10,472	35.70	–2.01	5	±0
Agreement of the Left of Menorca (PSM–EU)^{2}	4,367	14.89	–0.15	2	±0
Democratic and Social Centre (CDS)	2,732	9.31	+7.47	1	+1
Menorcan Independent Candidacy (CIM)	n/a	n/a	–11.74	0	–1
Blank ballots	354	1.21	+0.21		
Total	29,337			13	+1
Valid votes	29,337	98.90	+0.51		
Invalid votes	327	1.10	–0.51		
Votes cast / turnout	29,664	67.44	+0.63		
Abstentions	14,320	32.56	–0.63		
Registered voters	43,984				
Sources
Footnotes: ^{1} People's Alliance–Liberal Party results are compared to People's Coalition totals in the 1983 election.; ^{2} Agreement of the Left of Menorca results are compared to the combined totals of Socialist Party of Menorca and Communist Party of the Balearic Islands in the 1983 election.

=== 1983 ===
Summary of the 8 May 1983 Parliament of the Balearic Islands election results in Menorca
Parties and alliances	Popular vote			Seats	
Parties and alliances	Votes	%	±pp	Total	+/−
Spanish Socialist Workers' Party (PSOE)	10,441	37.71	n/a	5	n/a
People's Coalition (AP–PDP–UL)	9,042	32.66	n/a	4	n/a
Socialist Party of Menorca (PSM)	3,732	13.48	n/a	2	n/a
Menorcan Independent Candidacy (CIM)	3,250	11.74	n/a	1	n/a
Democratic and Social Centre (CDS)	510	1.84	n/a	0	n/a
Communist Party of the Balearic Islands (PCIB)	432	1.56	n/a	0	n/a
Blank ballots	278	1.00	n/a		
Total	27,685			12	n/a
Valid votes	27,685	98.39	n/a		
Invalid votes	453	1.61	n/a		
Votes cast / turnout	28,138	66.81	n/a		
Abstentions	13,980	33.19	n/a		
Registered voters	42,118				
