= 1983 Balearic regional election =

Election in the Spanish region of the Balearic Islands

- 8 May 1983

All 54 seats in the Parliament of the Balearic Islands 28 seats needed for a majority
- Opinion polls
- Registered: 488,336
- Turnout: 315,795 (64.7%)
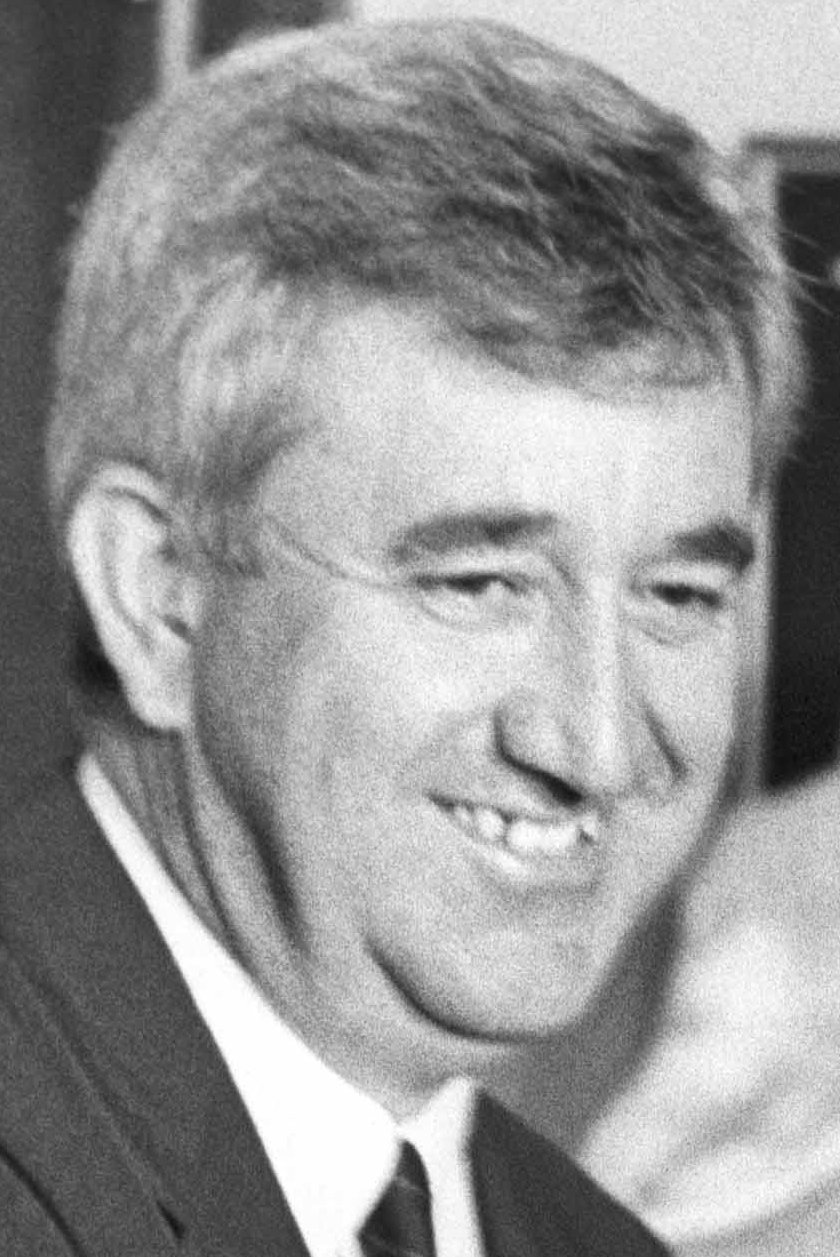

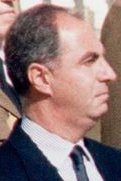

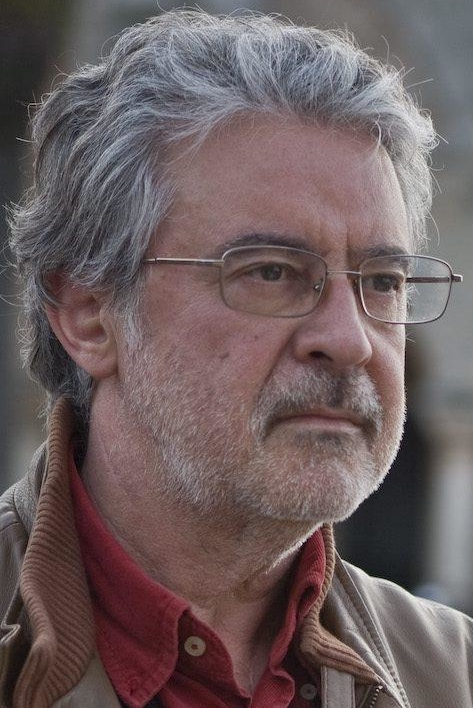

	First party	Second party	Third party
Leader	Gabriel Cañellas	Félix Pons	Jeroni Albertí
Party	AP–PDP–PL	PSOE	UM
Leader since	1980	1979	1982
Leader's seat	Mallorca	Mallorca	Mallorca
Seats won	21	21	6
Popular vote	110,629	107,906	46,915
Percentage	35.6%	34.7%	15.1%
	Fourth party	Fifth party	Sixth party
Leader	Sebastià Serra	Joan López Casasnovas	Alonso Marí Calbet
Party	PSM–PSI	PSM	PDL
Leader since	1983	1983	1983
Leader's seat	Mallorca	Menorca	Ibiza
Seats won	2	2	1
Popular vote	16,979	3,732	3,896
Percentage	5.5%	1.2%	1.3%
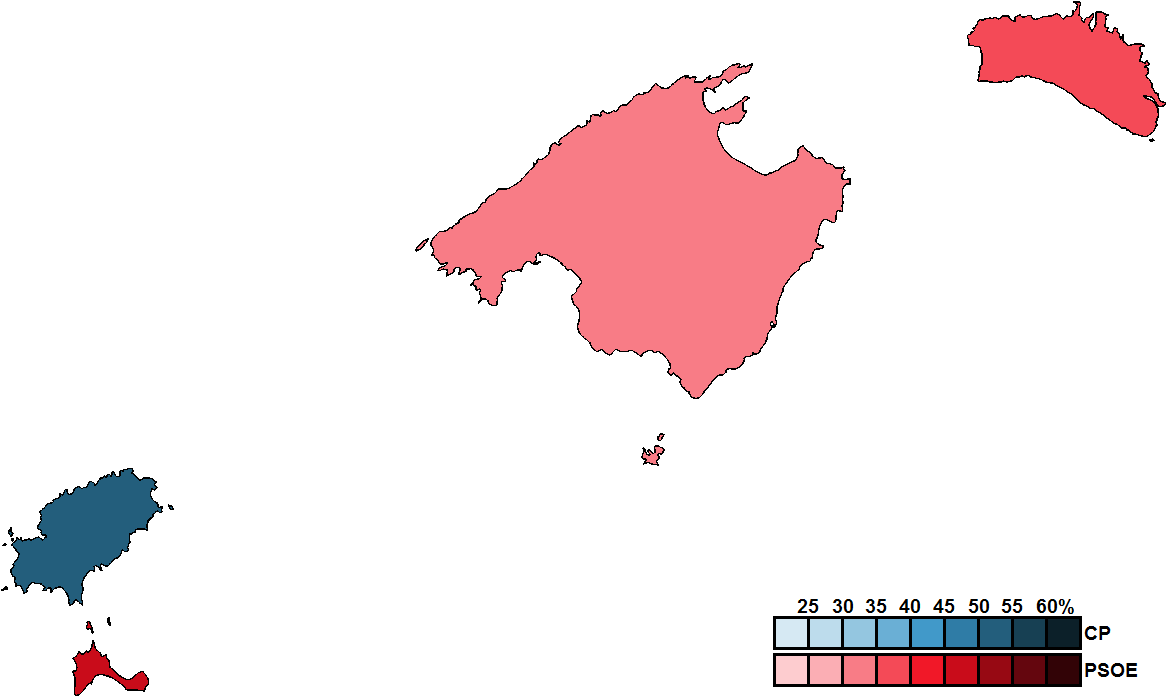
- Constituency results map for the Parliament of the Balearic Islands
President before election
Francesc Tutzó
Independent (ex-UCD) (Note: The UCD was dissolved as a political party in February 1983, with its regional presidents and elected officials maintaining their offices either as independents or joining other parties ahead of the May 1983 regional elections.)
Elected President
Gabriel Cañellas
AP–PDP–PL

A regional election was held in the Balearic Islands on 8 May 1983 to elect the 1st Parliament of the autonomous community. All 54 seats in the Parliament were up for election. It was held concurrently with regional elections in twelve other autonomous communities and local elections all throughout Spain.

The regional picture, at first glance, had been dominated by the Union of the Democratic Centre (UCD), heading the pre-autonomic government since 1978 and having won the 1979 elections to the Mallorca and Menorca Island Councils. However, the UCD was dissolved in early 1983 after its disastrous defeat in the 1982 Spanish general election, with its supporters fleeing to the People's Alliance (AP), the People's Democratic Party (PDP) or, as one of its erstwhile leaders, the newly founded Majorcan Union (UM). Other parties which had also contested the Island Council elections four years previously were the regional branch of the Spanish Socialist Workers' Party (PSOE), the Socialist Party of Mallorca (PSM) or the Communist Party of the Balearic Islands (PCIB).

The election resulted in a tie at 21 seats between the People's Coalition—formed by AP, the PDP and the Liberal Union (UL)—and the PSOE, with a narrow overall victory for the centre-right parties. AP candidate Gabriel Cañellas was able to access the regional government through the support of UM—which had obtained 6 seats—and the votes from the Liberal Democratic Party (PDL) and the Menorcan Independent Candidacy (CIM).

== Overview ==
=== Electoral system ===
The Parliament of the Balearic Islands was the devolved, unicameral legislature of the autonomous community of the Balearic Islands, having legislative power in regional matters as defined by the Spanish Constitution and the Balearic Statute of Autonomy, as well as the ability to vote confidence in or withdraw it from a regional president.

Transitory Provision Second of the Statute established a specific electoral procedure for the first election to the Parliament of the Balearic Islands, to be supplemented by the provisions within Royal Decree-Law 20/1977, of 18 March, and its related regulations. Voting for the Parliament was on the basis of universal suffrage, which comprised all nationals over 18 years of age, registered in the Balearic Islands and in full enjoyment of their political rights. The 54 members of the Parliament of the Balearic Islands were elected using the D'Hondt method and a closed list proportional representation, with an electoral threshold of three percent of valid votes—which included blank ballots—being applied in each constituency. Seats were allocated to constituencies, corresponding to the islands of Mallorca, Menorca, Ibiza and Formentera, with each being allocated a fixed number of seats: 30 for Mallorca, 12 for Menorca, 11 for Ibiza and 1 for Formentera.

In smaller constituencies, the use of the electoral method resulted in an effective threshold based on the district magnitude and the distribution of votes among candidacies.

=== Election date ===
The Inter-island General Council, in agreement with the Government of Spain, was required to call an election to the Parliament of the Balearic Islands before 31 May 1983. In the event of an investiture process failing to elect a regional president within a sixty-day period from the first ballot, the Parliament was to be automatically dissolved and a snap election called, with elected lawmakers serving the remainder of its original four-year term.

== Parties and candidates ==
The electoral law allowed for parties and federations registered in the interior ministry, coalitions and groupings of electors to present lists of candidates. Parties and federations intending to form a coalition ahead of an election were required to inform the relevant Electoral Commission within fifteen days of the election call, whereas groupings of electors needed to secure the signature of at least one-thousandth of the electorate in the constituencies for which they sought election—with a compulsory minimum of 500 signatures—disallowing electors from signing for more than one list of candidates.

Below is a list of the main parties and electoral alliances which contested the election:

Candidacy	Parties and alliances	Leading candidate	Ideology	Gov.	Ref.
PSOE	List: Spanish Socialist Workers' Party (PSOE)	Félix Pons	Social democracy	No	
AP–PDP–UL	List: People's Alliance (AP); People's Democratic Party (PDP); Liberal Union (UL)	Gabriel Cañellas	Conservatism; Christian democracy	No	
PSM–PSI	List: Socialist Party of Mallorca (PSM); Socialist Party of the Islands (PSI)	Sebastià Serra	Democratic socialism Left-wing nationalism	No	
PCIB	List: Communist Party of the Balearic Islands (PCIB)	Josep Valero	Eurocommunism	No	
PSMe	List: Socialist Party of Menorca (PSMe)	Joan López Casasnovas	Democratic socialism Left-wing nationalism	No	
UM	List: Majorcan Union (UM); Liberal Democratic Party (PDL)	Jeroni Albertí	Liberalism; Balearic regionalism	No	
PDL	List: Liberal Democratic Party (PDL)	Alonso Marí Calbet	Liberalism	No	
CIM	List: Menorcan Independent Candidacy (CIM)	Cristòfor Triay	Liberalism; Regionalism	No	

The electoral disaster of the Union of the Democratic Centre (UCD) in the October 1982 general election and the outcome of its extraordinary congress held in December, in which the party's leadership chose to transform the UCD into a christian democratic political force, brought the party to a process of virtual disintegration as many of its remaining members either switched party allegiances, split into new, independent candidacies or left politics altogether. Subsequent attempts to seek electoral allies ahead of the incoming 1983 local and regional elections, mainly the conservative People's Alliance (AP) and the christian democratic People's Democratic Party (PDP), had limited success due to concerns from both AP and UCD over such an alliance policy: AP strongly rejected any agreement that implied any sort of global coalition with UCD due to the party's ongoing decomposition, and prospects about a possible PDP–UCD merger did not come into fruition because of the latter's reluctance to dilute its brand within another party. In Mallorca, the former president of the Inter-island General Council, Jeroni Albertí, led the formation of the regionalist coalition Majorcan Union (UM) as a continuation of UCD on the island.

Together with AP, the PDP had agreed to maintain their general election alliance—now rebranded as the People's Coalition—for the May local and regional elections, with the inclusion of the Liberal Union (UL), a political party created in January 1983 out of independents from the AP–PDP coalition in an attempt to appeal to former UCD liberal voters. The Coalition had seen its numbers soar from late February as a result of many former members from the UCD's christian democratic wing joining the PDP.

The Majorcan Union (UM) won six seats in parliament, including party leader Jeroni Albertí and former Llucmajor mayor Miquel Clar Lladó.

== Opinion polls ==
The tables below list opinion polling results in reverse chronological order, showing the most recent first and using the dates when the survey fieldwork was done, as opposed to the date of publication. Where the fieldwork dates are unknown, the date of publication is given instead. The highest percentage figure in each polling survey is displayed with its background shaded in the leading party's colour. If a tie ensues, this is applied to the figures with the highest percentages. The "Lead" column on the right shows the percentage-point difference between the parties with the highest percentages in a poll.

=== Voting intention estimates ===
The table below lists weighted voting intention estimates. Refusals are generally excluded from the party vote percentages, while question wording and the treatment of "don't know" responses and those not intending to vote may vary between polling organisations. When available, seat projections determined by the polling organisations are displayed below (or in place of) the percentages in a smaller font; 28 seats were required for an absolute majority in the Parliament of the Balearic Islands.

Polling firm/Commissioner	Fieldwork date	Sample size	Turnout	UCD	PSOE	AP–PDP–UL	PCIB	PSM	PSMe	CDS	UM	PDL	CIM	Lead
1983 regional election	8 May 1983	—N/a	64.7	–	34.7; 21	35.6; 21	2.5; 0	5.5; 2	1.2; 2	2.1; 0	15.1; 6	1.3; 1	1.0; 1	0.9
Sofemasa/El País	23–26 Apr 1983	?	?	–	? 26/33	? 15/19	–	? 4/5	? 2/3	–	–	–	–	?
1982 general election	28 Oct 1982	—N/a	79.7	10.4 (6)	40.5 (25)	37.7 (Note: Results for CD (1979) and AP–PDP (1982).) (22)	1.7 (0)	2.0 (0)	0.4 (0)	5.3 (1)	–	–	–	2.8
1979 general election	1 Mar 1979	—N/a	69.6	48.9 (29)	29.4 (17)	9.2 (6)	4.9 (0)	2.6 (1)	0.8 (1)	–	–	–	–	19.5

=== Voting preferences ===
The table below lists raw, unweighted voting preferences.

Polling firm/Commissioner	Fieldwork date	Sample size	UCD	PSOE	AP–PDP–UL	PCIB	PSM	PSMe	CDS	UM	PDL	CIM	Question	X mark	Lead
1983 regional election	8 May 1983	—N/a	–	22.1	22.7	1.6	3.5	0.8	1.4	9.6	0.8	0.7	—N/a	35.3	0.9
Alef–DYM–Emopública/CIS	20–24 Apr 1983	611	–	21.9	9.1	0.8	2.0	1.8	1.3	2.4	0.7	0.4	51.4	7.1	12.8
CISE–Metra Seis–ECO/CIS	5–11 Apr 1983	500	–	29.9	13.8	1.4	6.5	(Note: Within PSM.)	2.9	–	–	–	33.2	9.8	16.1
1982 general election	28 Oct 1982	—N/a	8.0	30.9	28.8	1.3	1.5	0.3	4.0	–	–	–	—N/a	20.3	2.1
1979 general election	1 Mar 1979	—N/a	32.5	19.5	6.1	3.3	1.7	0.5	–	–	–	–	—N/a	30.4	13.0

== Results ==
=== Overall ===
Summary of the 8 May 1983 Parliament of the Balearic Islands election results →
Parties and alliances	Popular vote			Seats	
Parties and alliances	Votes	%	±pp	Total	+/−
People's Coalition (AP–PDP–UL)	110,629	35.58	n/a	21	n/a
Spanish Socialist Workers' Party (PSOE)	107,906	34.71	n/a	21	n/a
Majorcan Union (UM)	46,915	15.09	n/a	6	n/a
Socialist Party of Mallorca–Socialist Party of the Islands (PSM–PSI)	16,979	5.46	n/a	2	n/a
Communist Party of the Balearic Islands (PCIB)	7,669	2.47	n/a	0	n/a
Democratic and Social Centre (CDS)	6,611	2.13	n/a	0	n/a
Liberal Democratic Party (PDL)	3,896	1.25	n/a	1	n/a
Socialist Party of Menorca (PSM)	3,732	1.20	n/a	2	n/a
Menorcan Independent Candidacy (CIM)	3,250	1.05	n/a	1	n/a
Spanish Communist Workers' Party (PCOE)	1,509	0.49	n/a	0	n/a
Blank ballots	1,820	0.59	n/a		
Total	310,916			54	n/a
Valid votes	310,916	98.46	n/a		
Invalid votes	4,879	1.54	n/a		
Votes cast / turnout	315,795	64.67	n/a		
Abstentions	172,541	35.33	n/a		
Registered voters	488,336				

Popular vote
AP–PDP–UL	35.58%
PSOE	34.71%
UM	15.09%
PSM–PSI	5.46%
PCIB	2.47%
CDS	2.13%
PDL	1.25%
PSM	1.20%
CIM	1.05%
PCOE	0.49%
Blank ballots	0.59%

Seats
AP–PDP–UL	38.89%
PSOE	38.89%
UM	11.11%
PSM–PSI	3.70%
PSM	3.70%
PDL	1.85%
CIM	1.85%

=== Distribution by constituency ===
Constituency	CP		PSOE		UM		PSM–PSI		PDL		PSM		CIM	
Constituency	%	S	%	S	%	S	%	S	%	S	%	S	%	S
Formentera	39.2	−	49.1	1					11.5	−				
Ibiza	51.5	6	30.7	4					14.6	1				
Mallorca	34.3	11	34.7	11	18.3	6	6.6	2						
Menorca	32.7	4	37.7	5							13.5	2	11.7	1
Total	35.6	21	34.7	21	15.1	6	5.5	2	1.3	1	1.2	2	1.1	1

== Aftermath ==
=== Government formation ===
Investiture; Nomination of Gabriel Cañellas (AP)
Ballot →	7 June 1983
Required majority →	28 out of 54
Yes: • AP–PDP–UL (21); • UM (6); • PDL (1); • CIM (1)	29 / 54
No: • PSOE (21); • PSM (2); • PSMe (2)	25 / 54
Abstentions	0 / 54
Absentees	0 / 54
