= 1987 Balearic regional election =

Election in the Spanish region of the Balearic Islands

- 10 June 1987

All 59 seats in the Parliament of the Balearic Islands 30 seats needed for a majority
- Opinion polls
- Registered: 507,258 ▲3.9%
- Turnout: 338,149 (66.9%) ▲2.2 pp
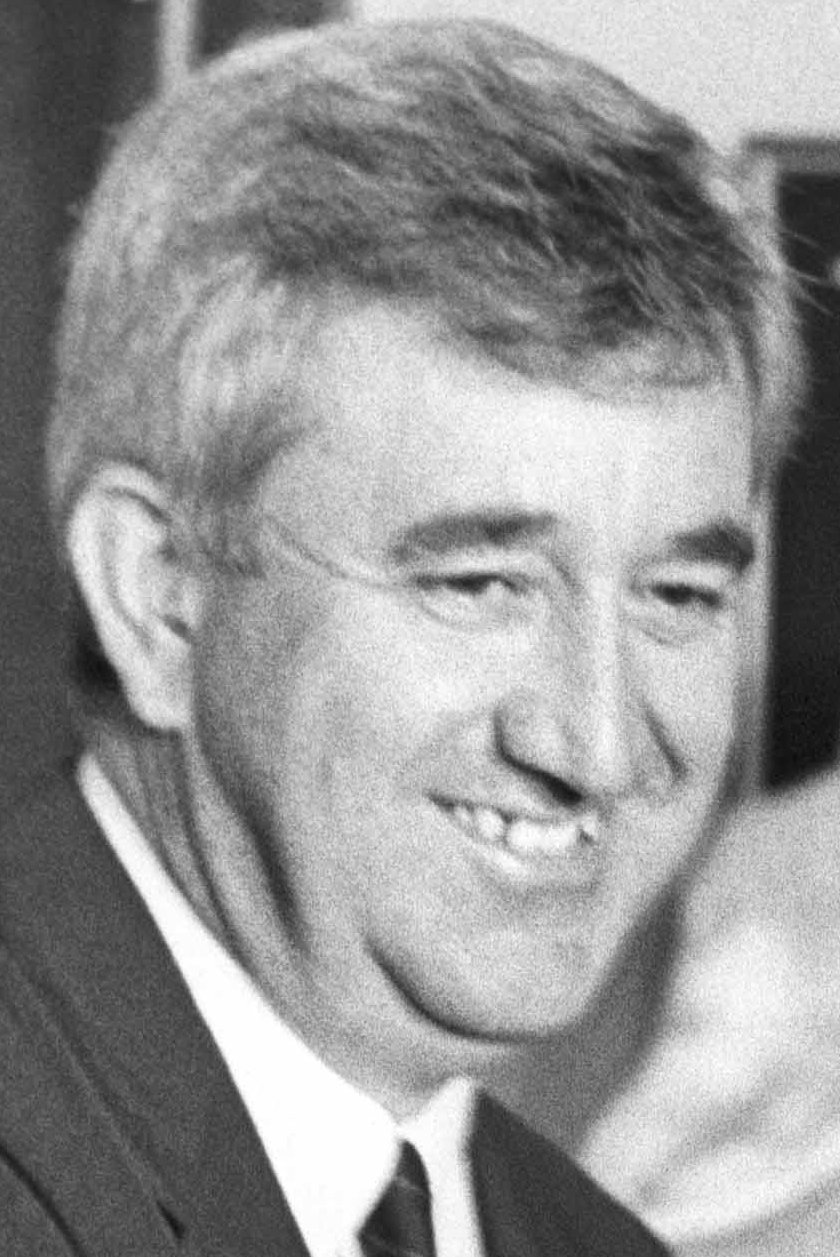

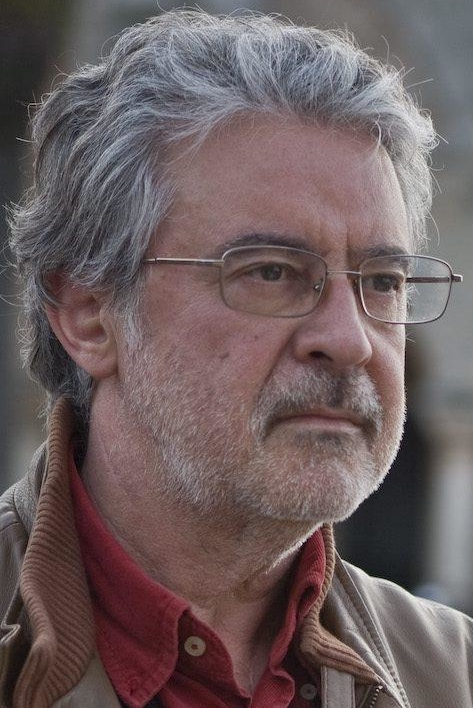
| | First party | Second party | Third party |
|---|---|---|---|
| Leader | Gabriel Cañellas | Joan Francesc Triay | Francesc Quetglas |
| Party | AP–PL | PSOE | CDS |
| Leader since | 1980 | 1986 | 1982 |
| Leader's seat | Mallorca | Mallorca | Mallorca |
| Last election | 21 seats, 35.6% (Note: Results for AP–PDP–UL in the 1983 election.) | 21 seats, 34.7% | 0 seats, 2.1% |
| Seats won | 25 | 21 | 5 |
| Seat change | ▲4 | 0 | ▲5 |
| Popular vote | 123,044 | 107,762 | 34,046 |
| Percentage | 36.7% | 32.5% | 10.2% |
| Swing | ▲1.1 pp | ▼2.2 pp | ▲8.1 pp |
| | Fourth party | Fifth party | Sixth party |
| Leader | Jeroni Albertí | Sebastià Serra | Joan López Casasnovas |
| Party | UM | PSM–EN | PSM–EU |
| Leader since | 1982 | 1983 | 1983 |
| Leader's seat | Mallorca | Mallorca | Menorca |
| Last election | 6 seats, 15.1% | 2 seats, 5.5% | 2 seats, 1.3% (Note: Results for PSM (1.2%, 2 seats) and PCIB in Menorca (0.1%, 0 seats) in the 1983 election.) |
| Seats won | 4 | 2 | 2 |
| Seat change | ▼2 | 0 | 0 |
| Popular vote | 30,247 | 16,383 | 4,367 |
| Percentage | 9.0% | 4.9% | 1.3% |
| Swing | ▼6.1 pp | ▼0.6 pp | 0.0 pp |
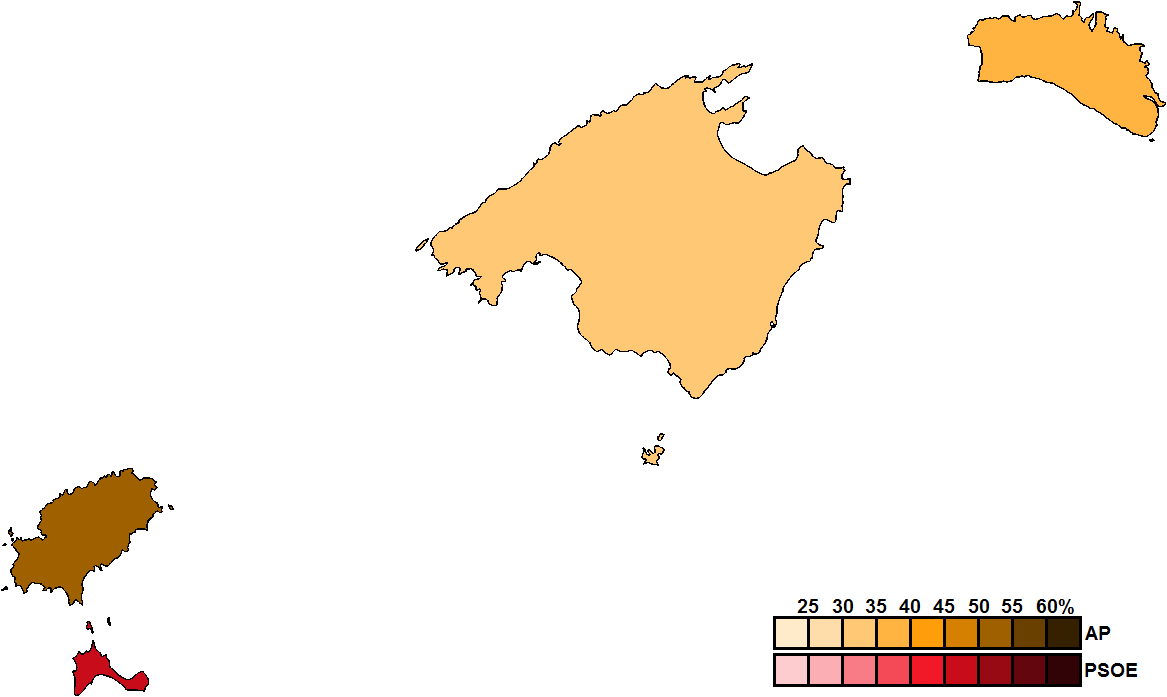
- Constituency results map for the Parliament of the Balearic Islands
President before election
Gabriel Cañellas
AP–PL
President after election
Gabriel Cañellas
AP–PL

A regional election was held in the Balearic Islands on 10 June 1987 to elect the 2nd Parliament of the autonomous community. All 59 seats in the Parliament were up for election. It was held concurrently with regional elections in twelve other autonomous communities and local elections all across Spain, as well as the 1987 European Parliament election.

The governing party People's Alliance (AP), in alliance with Liberal Party (PL), increased support compared to the previous election. The Spanish Socialist Workers' Party (PSOE) received fewer votes than in 1983, but obtained the same seats due to the increase of total parliamentary seats. The third force in the 1983 election, Majorcan Union (UM), lost support in part due to the important increase of Democratic and Social Centre (CDS). Because of this, UM could not repeat their previous support to AP–PL, and instead both parties formed an alliance in the Government, thanks to the abstention of CDS in the investiture vote. This meant that Gabriel Cañellas was invested as President of the Balearic Islands for a second term. Finally, the Nationalist Left (EN), that obtained the same 4 seats presenting candidates in Mallorca and Menorca, lost overall popular support but gained votes in Menorca thanks to the alliance with United Left (EU) in this district.

== Overview ==
Under the 1983 Statute of Autonomy, the Parliament of the Balearic Islands was the unicameral legislature of the homonymous autonomous community, having legislative power in devolved matters, as well as the ability to grant or withdraw confidence from a regional president. The electoral and procedural rules were supplemented by national law provisions.

=== Date ===
The term of the Parliament of the Balearic Islands expired four years after the date of its previous ordinary election. The election decree was required to be issued no later than 25 days before the scheduled expiration date of parliament and published on the following day in the Official Gazette of the Balearic Islands (BOIB), with election day taking place between 54 and 60 days after the decree's publication. The previous election was held on 8 May 1983, which meant that the chamber's term would have expired on 8 May 1987. The election decree was required to be published in the BOIB no later than 14 April 1987, setting the latest possible date for election day on 13 June 1987.

The Parliament of the Balearic Islands could not be dissolved before the expiration date of parliament, except in the event of an investiture process failing to elect a regional president within a 60-day period from the Parliament's reconvening. In such a case, the chamber was to be automatically dissolved and a snap election called, with elected lawmakers serving the remainder of its original four-year term.

The election to the Parliament of the Balearic Islands was officially called on 14 April 1987 with the publication of the corresponding decree in the BOIB, setting election day for 10 June and scheduling for the chamber to reconvene on 3 July.

=== Electoral system ===
Voting for the Parliament was based on universal suffrage, comprising all Spanish nationals over 18 years of age, registered in the Balearic Islands and with full political rights, provided that they had not been deprived of the right to vote by a final sentence, nor were legally incapacitated.

The Parliament of the Balearic Islands had 59 seats. All were elected in four multi-member constituencies—corresponding to the islands of Mallorca, Menorca, Ibiza and Formentera, each of which was assigned a fixed number of seats—using the D'Hondt method and closed-list proportional voting, with a five percent-threshold of valid votes (including blank ballots) in each constituency. The use of this electoral method resulted in a higher effective threshold depending on district magnitude and vote distribution.

As a result of the aforementioned allocation, each Parliament constituency was entitled the following seats:

| Seats | Constituencies |
|---|---|
| 33 | Mallorca |
| 13 | Menorca |
| 12 | Ibiza |
| 1 | Formentera |

The law did not provide for by-elections to fill vacant seats; instead, any vacancies arising after the proclamation of candidates and during the legislative term were filled by the next candidates on the party lists or, when required, by designated substitutes.

=== Outgoing parliament ===
The table below shows the composition of the parliamentary groups in the chamber at the time of the election call.

Parliamentary composition in April 1987
| Groups | Parties | Legislators | |
| Groups | Parties | Seats | Total |
|---|---|---|---|
| People's Parliamentary Group | AP | 18 | 23 |
| People's Parliamentary Group | PDP | 3 | 23 |
| People's Parliamentary Group | PL | 2 | 23 |
| Socialist Parliamentary Group | PSOE | 21 | 21 |
| Island Regionalist Parliamentary Group | UM | 5 | 6 |
| Island Regionalist Parliamentary Group | CIM | 1 | 6 |
| Nationalist Left Parliamentary Group | PSMe | 2 | 3 |
| Nationalist Left Parliamentary Group | PSM | 1 | 3 |
| Mixed Parliamentary Group | INDEP | 1 (Note: Damià Pons, former PSM legislator.) | 1 |

== Opinion polls ==
The tables below list opinion polling results in reverse chronological order, showing the most recent first and using the dates when the survey fieldwork was done, as opposed to the date of publication. Where the fieldwork dates are unknown, the date of publication is given instead. The highest percentage figure in each polling survey is displayed with its background shaded in the leading party's colour. If a tie ensues, this is applied to the figures with the highest percentages. The "Lead" column on the right shows the percentage-point difference between the parties with the highest percentages in a poll.

=== Voting intention estimates ===
The table below lists weighted voting intention estimates. Refusals are generally excluded from the party vote percentages, while question wording and the treatment of "don't know" responses and those not intending to vote may vary between polling organisations. When available, seat projections determined by the polling organisations are displayed below (or in place of) the percentages in a smaller font; 30 seats were required for an absolute majority in the Parliament of the Balearic Islands.

| Polling firm/Commissioner | Fieldwork date | Sample size | Turnout | AP–PDP–PL | PSOE | UM | PSM | EU–IU | CDS | AP–PL | EEM | PDP | Lead |
|---|---|---|---|---|---|---|---|---|---|---|---|---|---|
| 1987 regional election | 10 Jun 1987 | —N/a | 66.9 | – | 32.5; 21 | 9.0; 4 | 4.9; 2 | 2.2; 0 | 10.2; 5 | 36.7; 25 | 1.3; 2 | 1.6; 0 | 4.2 |
| Demoscopia/El País | 22–26 May 1987 | ? | 66 | – | 31.3; 18 | 15.4; 10 | 2.5; 0 | 1.5; 0 | 10.1; 6 | 33.0; 25 | (Note: Within PSM.) | 2.2; 0 | 1.7 |
| CIS | 13 May 1987 | ? | ? | – | ? 27 | ? 2 | ? 2 | – | ? 10 | ? 17 | | – | ? |
| 1986 general election | 22 Jun 1986 | —N/a | 66.0 | 34.3 | 40.3 | – | 2.2 | 2.3 | 11.3 | (Note: Within CP.) | – | | 7.0 |
| 1983 regional election | 8 May 1983 | —N/a | 64.7 | 35.6; 21 | 34.7; 21 | 16.3; 7 | 5.5; 2 | 2.5 (Note: Results for PCIB in the 1983 election.); 0 | 2.1; 0 | | 1.2 (Note: Results for PSM in the 1983 election.); 2 | | 0.9 |

== Results ==
=== Overall ===
← Summary of the 10 June 1987 Parliament of the Balearic Islands election results →
| Parties and alliances | Popular vote | | | Seats | |
| Parties and alliances | Votes | % | ±pp | Total | +/− |
|---|---|---|---|---|---|
| People's Alliance–Liberal Party (AP–PL)^{1} | 123,130 | 36.71 | +1.13 | 25 | +4 |
| Spanish Socialist Workers' Party (PSOE) | 108,910 | 32.47 | −2.24 | 21 | ±0 |
| Democratic and Social Centre (CDS) | 34,146 | 10.18 | +8.05 | 5 | +5 |
| Majorcan Union (UM) | 30,247 | 9.02 | −6.07 | 4 | −2 |
| Socialist Party of Mallorca–Nationalist Left (PSM–EN) | 16,383 | 4.88 | −0.58 | 2 | ±0 |
| United Left (EU–IU)^{2} | 7,428 | 2.21 | −0.12 | 0 | ±0 |
| People's Democratic Party (PDP) | 5,212 | 1.55 | New | 0 | ±0 |
| Agreement of the Left of Menorca (PSM–EU)^{3} | 4,367 | 1.30 | −0.04 | 2 | ±0 |
| Workers' Party of Spain–Communist Unity (PTE–UC) | 1,072 | 0.32 | New | 0 | ±0 |
| Life and Autonomy (VIA) | 961 | 0.29 | New | 0 | ±0 |
| Liberal Democratic Party (PDL) | n/a | n/a | −1.25 | 0 | −1 |
| Menorcan Independent Candidacy (CIM) | n/a | n/a | −1.05 | 0 | −1 |
| Blank ballots | 3,525 | 1.05 | +0.46 | | |
| Total | 335,381 | | | 59 | +5 |
| Valid votes | 335,381 | 98.77 | +0.31 | | |
| Invalid votes | 4,163 | 1.23 | −0.31 | | |
| Votes cast / turnout | 339,544 | 66.94 | +2.27 | | |
| Abstentions | 167,714 | 33.06 | −2.27 | | |
| Registered voters | 507,258 | | | | |
Sources
Footnotes: ^{1} People's Alliance–Liberal Party results are compared to People's Coalition totals in the 1983 election.; ^{2} United Left results are compared to Communist Party of the Balearic Islands totals in the 1983 election, not including results in Menorca.; ^{3} Agreement of the Left of Menorca results are compared to the combined totals of Socialist Party of Menorca and Communist Party of the Balearic Islands in Menorca in the 1983 election.

Popular vote
| AP–PL | 36.71% |
| PSOE | 32.47% |
| CDS | 10.18% |
| UM | 9.02% |
| PSM–EN | 4.88% |
| EU–IU | 2.21% |
| PDP | 1.55% |
| PSM–EU | 1.30% |
| Others | 0.61% |
| Blank ballots | 1.05% |

Seats
| AP–PL | 42.37% |
| PSOE | 35.59% |
| CDS | 8.47% |
| UM | 6.78% |
| PSM–EN | 3.39% |
| PSM–EU | 3.39% |

=== Distribution by constituency ===
| Constituency | AP–PL | | PSOE | | CDS | | UM | | PSM–EN | | PSM–EU | |
| Constituency | % | S | % | S | % | S | % | S | % | S | % | S |
|---|---|---|---|---|---|---|---|---|---|---|---|---|
| Formentera | 38.8 | − | 46.8 | 1 | 13.6 | − | | | | | | |
| Ibiza | 53.4 | 7 | 34.7 | 4 | 7.7 | 1 | | | | | | |
| Mallorca | 34.9 | 13 | 31.8 | 11 | 10.5 | 3 | 10.9 | 4 | 5.9 | 2 | | |
| Menorca | 38.9 | 5 | 35.7 | 5 | 9.3 | 1 | | | | | 14.9 | 2 |
| Total | 36.7 | 25 | 32.5 | 21 | 10.2 | 5 | 9.0 | 4 | 4.9 | 2 | 1.3 | 2 |

== Aftermath ==
=== Government formation ===
Investiture; Nomination of Gabriel Cañellas (AP)
| Ballot → | 15 July 1987 | 17 July 1987 |
| Required majority → | 30 out of 59 | Simple |
| Yes: • AP–PL (25); • UM (4) | 29 / 59 | 29 / 59 |
| No: • PSOE (21); • PSM (2); • PSMe (2) | 25 / 59 | 25 / 59 |
| Abstentions: • CDS (5) | 5 / 59 | 5 / 59 |
| Absentees | 0 / 59 | 0 / 59 |

== Bibliography ==
- Ley Orgánica 2/1983, de 25 de febrero, de Estatuto de Autonomía para las islas Baleares (Organic Law 2/1983). Official State Gazette (in Spanish). 1 March 1983. BOE-A-1983-6316.
- Ley 5/1984, de 24 de octubre, de Régimen Jurídico de la Administración de la Comunidad Autónoma de las Islas Baleares (Law 5/1984). Official State Gazette (in Spanish). 24 October 1984. BOE-A-1985-3470.
- Ley Orgánica 5/1985, de 19 de junio, del Régimen Electoral General (Organic Law 5/1985). Official State Gazette (in Spanish). 19 June 1985 [version as of 3 April 1987]. BOE-A-1985-11672.
- Ley 8/1986, de 26 de noviembre, Electoral de la Comunidad Autónoma de las Islas Baleares (Law 8/1986). Official State Gazette (in Spanish). 26 November 1986 [version as of 20 December 1986]. BOE-A-1987-2903.
- Decreto 19/1987, de 13 de abril, de convocatoria de las elecciones al Parlamento de las islas Baleares (PDF) (Decree 19/1987). Official State Gazette (in Spanish). 13 April 1987.
