= 1991 Balearic regional election =

Election in the Spanish region of the Balearic Islands

- 26 May 1991

All 59 seats in the Parliament of the Balearic Islands 30 seats needed for a majority
- Opinion polls
- Registered: 566,243 ▲11.6%
- Turnout: 341,294 (60.3%) ▼6.6 pp
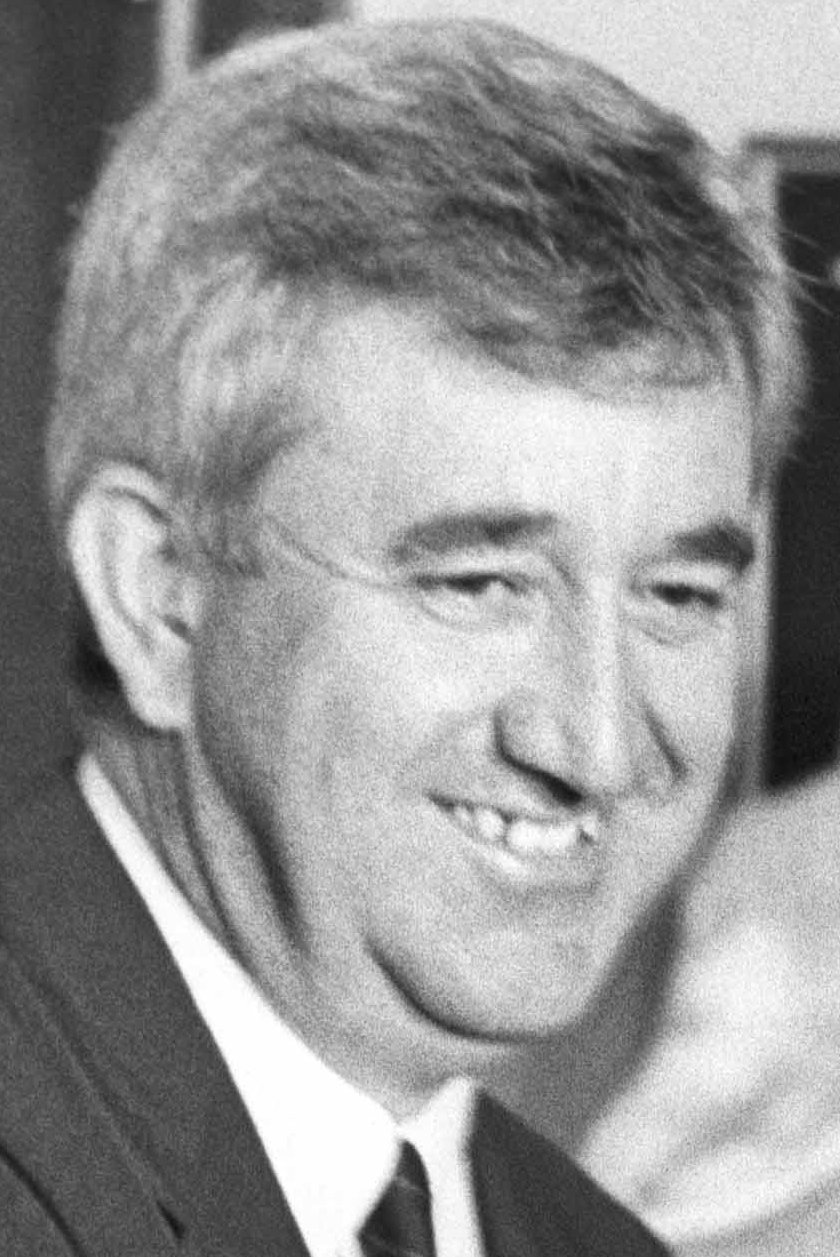

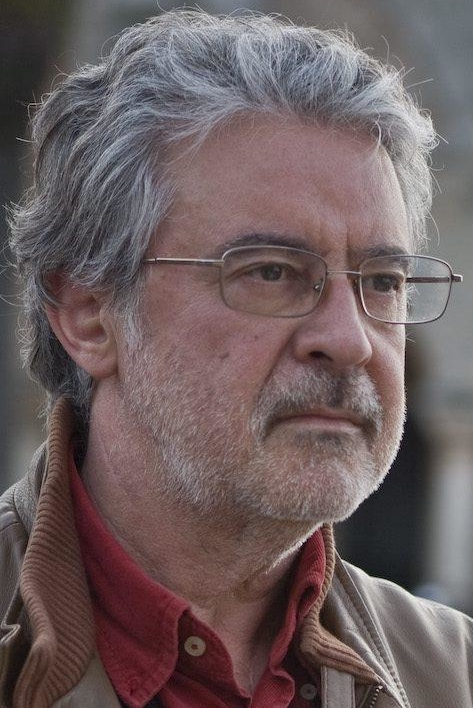

	First party	Second party	Third party
Leader	Gabriel Cañellas	Francesc Obrador	Mateu Morro
Party	PP–UM	PSIB–PSOE	PSM–NM
Leader since	1980	1991	1988
Leader's seat	Mallorca	Mallorca	Mallorca
Last election	29 seats, 47.3% (Note: Results for AP–PL (36.7%, 25 seats), UM (9.0%, 4 seats) and PDP (1.6%, 0 seats) in the 1987 election.)	21 seats, 32.5%	2 seats, 4.9%
Seats won	31	21	3
Seat change	▲2	0	▲1
Popular vote	160,512	102,060	22,522
Percentage	47.3%	30.1%	6.6%
Swing	0.0 pp	▼2.4 pp	▲1.7 pp
	Fourth party	Fifth party	Sixth party
Leader	Joan López Casasnovas	Miquel Pascual	Cosme Vidal Juan
Party	PSM–EU	UIM–IM	FIEF
Leader since	1983	1991	1991
Leader's seat	Menorca	Mallorca	Ibiza
Last election	2 seats, 1.3%	Did not contest	Did not contest
Seats won	2	1	1
Seat change	0	▲1	▲1
Popular vote	4,654	8,429	2,468
Percentage	1.4%	2.5%	0.7%
Swing	▲0.1 pp	New party	New party
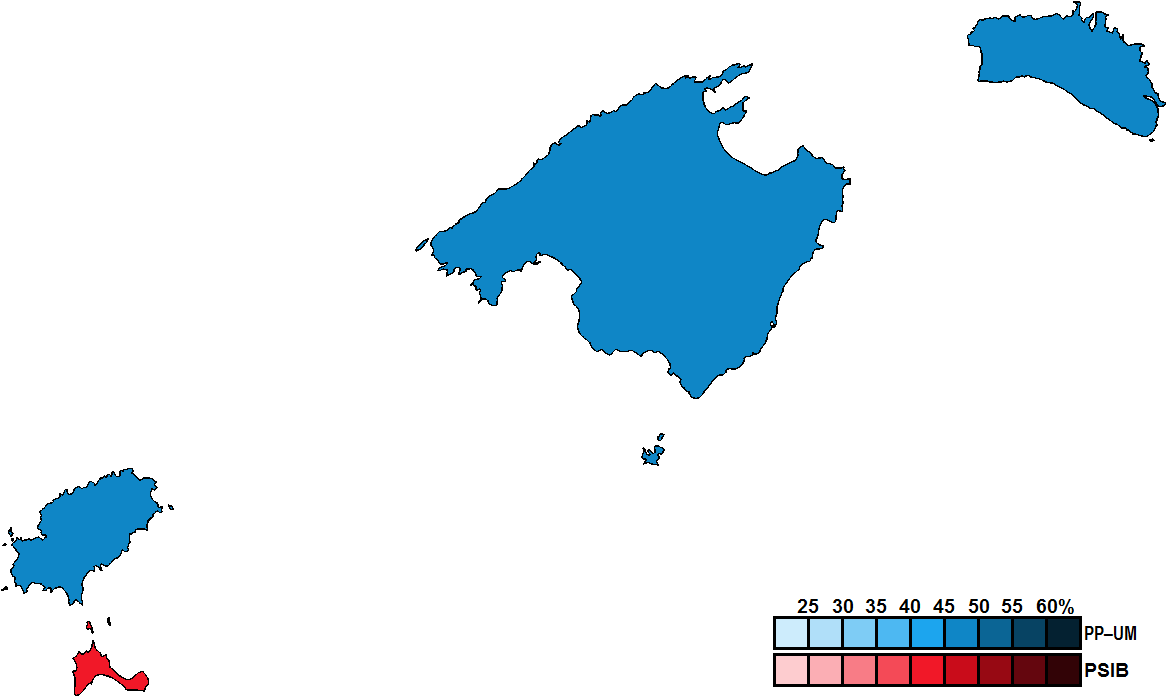
- Constituency results map for the Parliament of the Balearic Islands
President before election
Gabriel Cañellas
PP–UM
President after election
Gabriel Cañellas
PP–UM

A regional election was held in the Balearic Islands on 26 May 1991 to elect the 3rd Parliament of the autonomous community. All 59 seats in the Parliament were up for election. It was held concurrently with regional elections in twelve other autonomous communities and local elections all across Spain.

== Overview ==
Under the 1983 Statute of Autonomy, the Parliament of the Balearic Islands was the unicameral legislature of the homonymous autonomous community, having legislative power in devolved matters, as well as the ability to grant or withdraw confidence from a regional president. The electoral and procedural rules were supplemented by national law provisions.

=== Date ===
The term of the Parliament of the Balearic Islands expired four years after the date of its previous ordinary election, with election day being fixed for the fourth Sunday of May every four years. The election decree was required to be issued between 54 and 60 days before the scheduled election date and published on the following day in the Official Gazette of the Balearic Islands (BOIB). The previous election was held on 10 June 1987, setting the date for election day on the fourth Sunday of May four years later, which was 26 May 1991.

The Parliament of the Balearic Islands could not be dissolved before the expiration date of parliament, except in the event of an investiture process failing to elect a regional president within a 60-day period from the Parliament's reconvening. In such a case, the chamber was to be automatically dissolved and a snap election called, with elected lawmakers serving the remainder of its original four-year term.

The election to the Parliament of the Balearic Islands was officially called on 2 April 1991 with the publication of the corresponding decree in the BOIB, setting election day for 26 May and scheduling for the chamber to reconvene on 19 June.

=== Electoral system ===
Voting for the Parliament was based on universal suffrage, comprising all Spanish nationals over 18 years of age, registered in the Balearic Islands and with full political rights, provided that they had not been deprived of the right to vote by a final sentence, nor were legally incapacitated.

The Parliament of the Balearic Islands had 59 seats. All were elected in four multi-member constituencies—corresponding to the islands of Mallorca, Menorca, Ibiza and Formentera, each of which was assigned a fixed number of seats—using the D'Hondt method and closed-list proportional voting, with a five percent-threshold of valid votes (including blank ballots) in each constituency. The use of this electoral method resulted in a higher effective threshold depending on district magnitude and vote distribution.

As a result of the aforementioned allocation, each Parliament constituency was entitled the following seats:

Seats	Constituencies
33	Mallorca
13	Menorca
12	Ibiza
1	Formentera

The law did not provide for by-elections to fill vacant seats; instead, any vacancies arising after the proclamation of candidates and during the legislative term were filled by the next candidates on the party lists or, when required, by designated substitutes.

=== Outgoing parliament ===
The table below shows the composition of the parliamentary groups in the chamber at the time of the election call.

Parliamentary composition in April 1991
Groups	Parties	Legislators	
Groups	Parties	Seats	Total
People's Parliamentary Group	PP	25	25
Socialist Parliamentary Group	PSIB–PSOE	20	20
CDS Parliamentary Group	CDS	4	4
Nationalist and Left Parliamentary Group	PSM	2	5
Nationalist and Left Parliamentary Group	PSMe	2	5
Nationalist and Left Parliamentary Group	INDEP	1 (Note: Paula Guillem, former PSIB–PSOE legislator.)	5
Majorcan Union Parliamentary Group	UM	3	3
Mixed Parliamentary Group	INDEP	2 (Note: Carles Ricci, former CDS legislator; Manuel Pérez Ramos, former UM legislator.)	2

== Opinion polls ==
The tables below list opinion polling results in reverse chronological order, showing the most recent first and using the dates when the survey fieldwork was done, as opposed to the date of publication. Where the fieldwork dates are unknown, the date of publication is given instead. The highest percentage figure in each polling survey is displayed with its background shaded in the leading party's colour. If a tie ensues, this is applied to the figures with the highest percentages. The "Lead" column on the right shows the percentage-point difference between the parties with the highest percentages in a poll.

=== Voting intention estimates ===
The table below lists weighted voting intention estimates. Refusals are generally excluded from the party vote percentages, while question wording and the treatment of "don't know" responses and those not intending to vote may vary between polling organisations. When available, seat projections determined by the polling organisations are displayed below (or in place of) the percentages in a smaller font; 30 seats were required for an absolute majority in the Parliament of the Balearic Islands.

Polling firm/Commissioner	Fieldwork date	Sample size	Turnout	AP	PSOE	CDS	UM	PSM	EU–IU	PDP	EEM	PP	ARM	UIM	FIEF	Lead
1991 regional election	26 May 1991	—N/a	60.3	(Note: Within PP.)	30.1; 21	2.9; 0		6.6; 3	2.3; 0		1.4; 2	47.3; 31	–	2.5; 1	0.7; 1	17.2
Sigma Dos/El Mundo	18 May 1991	?	?		31.5; 19/22	5.3; 1/2		6.3; 4	4.0; 0/1		–	46.7; 31/33	–	–	–	15.2
Metra Seis/El Independiente	12 May 1991	?	?		30.4; 22	7.3; 3		10.4; 4	2.7; 1		1.1; 1/2	40.8; 27/28	–	–	–	10.4
Demoscopia/El País	4–7 May 1991	400	?		31.3; 22	4.7; 3		8.1; 3	5.6; 1		–	45.2; 30	–	–	–	13.9
1989 general election	29 Oct 1989	—N/a	63.5		34.5	9.2	–	2.3	5.1		–	40.7	2.5	–	–	6.2
1989 EP election	15 Jun 1989	—N/a	44.7		35.6	8.2	–	4.2	3.5		–	32.9	5.7	–	–	2.7
1987 regional election	10 Jun 1987	—N/a	66.9	36.7; 25	32.5; 21	10.2; 5	9.0; 4	4.9; 2	2.2; 0	1.6; 0	1.3; 2	–	–	–	–	4.2

== Results ==
=== Overall ===
← Summary of the 26 May 1991 Parliament of the Balearic Islands election results →
Parties and alliances	Popular vote			Seats	
Parties and alliances	Votes	%	±pp	Total	+/−
People's Party–Majorcan Union (PP–UM)	160,512	47.32	+0.04	31	+2
People's Party–Majorcan Union (PP–UM)^{1}	130,275	38.41	−0.93	18	+1
People's Party (PP)^{2}	30,237	8.91	+0.96	13	+1
Socialist Party of the Balearic Islands (PSIB–PSOE)	102,060	30.09	−2.38	21	±0
Socialist Party of Mallorca–Nationalists of Majorca (PSM–NM)	22,522	6.64	+1.76	3	+1
Democratic and Social Centre (CDS)	9,938	2.93	−7.25	0	−5
Independent Union of Majorca–Independents of Majorca (UIM–IM)	8,429	2.49	New	1	+1
United Left (EU–IU)	7,741	2.28	+0.07	0	±0
The Greens (EV)	7,205	2.12	New	0	±0
Balearic Convergence (CB)	5,513	1.63	New	0	±0
Agreement of the Left of Menorca (PSM–EU)	4,654	1.37	+0.07	2	±0
Independents of Ibiza and Formentera Federation (FIEF)	2,468	0.73	New	1	+1
Nationalist and Ecologist Agreement (ENE)	1,392	0.41	New	0	±0
Independents of Formentera Group (GUIF)	692	0.20	New	0	±0
Progressive Union of Menorca (UPdeM)	624	0.18	New	0	±0
Spanish Phalanx of the CNSO (FE–JONS)	600	0.18	New	0	±0
Alliance for the Republic (AxR)	596	0.18	New	0	±0
Balearic Radical Party (PRB)	549	0.16	New	0	±0
Left Unitary Platform (PCE (m–l)–CRPE)	259	0.08	New	0	±0
Blank ballots	2,934	0.87	−0.18		
Total	339,188			59	±0
Valid votes	339,188	99.38	+0.66		
Invalid votes	2,106	0.62	−0.66		
Votes cast / turnout	341,294	60.27	−6.67		
Abstentions	224,949	39.73	+6.67		
Registered voters	566,243				
Sources
Footnotes: ^{1} People's Party–Majorcan Union results are compared to the combined totals of People's Alliance–Liberal Party in Majorca, Majorcan Union and People's Democratic Party in the 1987 election.; ^{2} People's Party results are compared to People's Alliance–Liberal Party results in Menorca, Ibiza and Formentera in the 1987 election.

Popular vote
PP–UM	47.32%
PSIB–PSOE	30.09%
PSM–NM	6.64%
CDS	2.93%
UIM–IM	2.49%
EU–IU	2.28%
EV	2.12%
CB	1.63%
PSM–EU	1.37%
FIEF	0.73%
Others	1.39%
Blank ballots	0.87%

Seats
PP–UM	52.54%
PSIB–PSOE	35.59%
PSM–NM	5.08%
PSM–EU	3.39%
UIM–IM	1.69%
FIEF	1.69%

=== Distribution by constituency ===
Constituency	PP–UM		PSIB		PSM–NM		UIM–IM		PSM–EU		FIEF	
Constituency	%	S	%	S	%	S	%	S	%	S	%	S
Formentera	28.6	−	40.4	1								
Ibiza	49.5	7	31.8	4							8.3	1
Mallorca	47.5	18	29.4	11	8.2	3	3.1	1				
Menorca	45.1	6	33.6	5					14.1	2		
Total	47.3	31	30.1	21	6.6	3	2.5	1	1.4	2	0.7	1

== Aftermath ==
=== Government formation ===
Investiture; Nomination of Gabriel Cañellas (PP)
Ballot →	27 June 1991
Required majority →	30 out of 59
Yes: • PP–UM (31)	31 / 59
No: • PSIB (21); • PSM–EEM (5)	26 / 59
Abstentions: • UIM–IM (1); • FIEF (1)	2 / 59
Absentees	0 / 59

== Bibliography ==
- Ley Orgánica 2/1983, de 25 de febrero, de Estatuto de Autonomía para las islas Baleares (Organic Law 2/1983). Official State Gazette (in Spanish). 1 March 1983. BOE-A-1983-6316.
- Ley 5/1984, de 24 de octubre, de Régimen Jurídico de la Administración de la Comunidad Autónoma de las Islas Baleares (Law 5/1984). Official State Gazette (in Spanish). 24 October 1984. BOE-A-1985-3470.
- Ley Orgánica 5/1985, de 19 de junio, del Régimen Electoral General (Organic Law 5/1985). Official State Gazette (in Spanish). 19 June 1985 [version as of 14 March 1991]. BOE-A-1985-11672.
- Ley 8/1986, de 26 de noviembre, Electoral de la Comunidad Autónoma de las Islas Baleares (Law 8/1986). Official State Gazette (in Spanish). 26 November 1986 [version as of 20 December 1986]. BOE-A-1987-2903.
- Decreto 26/1991, de 1 de abril, de convocatoria de las elecciones al Parlamento de las Islas Baleares (PDF) (Decree 26/1991). Official State Gazettes (in Spanish). 1 April 1991.
