= 1995 Balearic regional election =

Election in the Spanish region of the Balearic Islands

- 28 May 1995

All 59 seats in the Parliament of the Balearic Islands 30 seats needed for a majority
- Opinion polls
- Registered: 594,666 ▲5.0%
- Turnout: 377,943 (63.6%) ▲3.3 pp
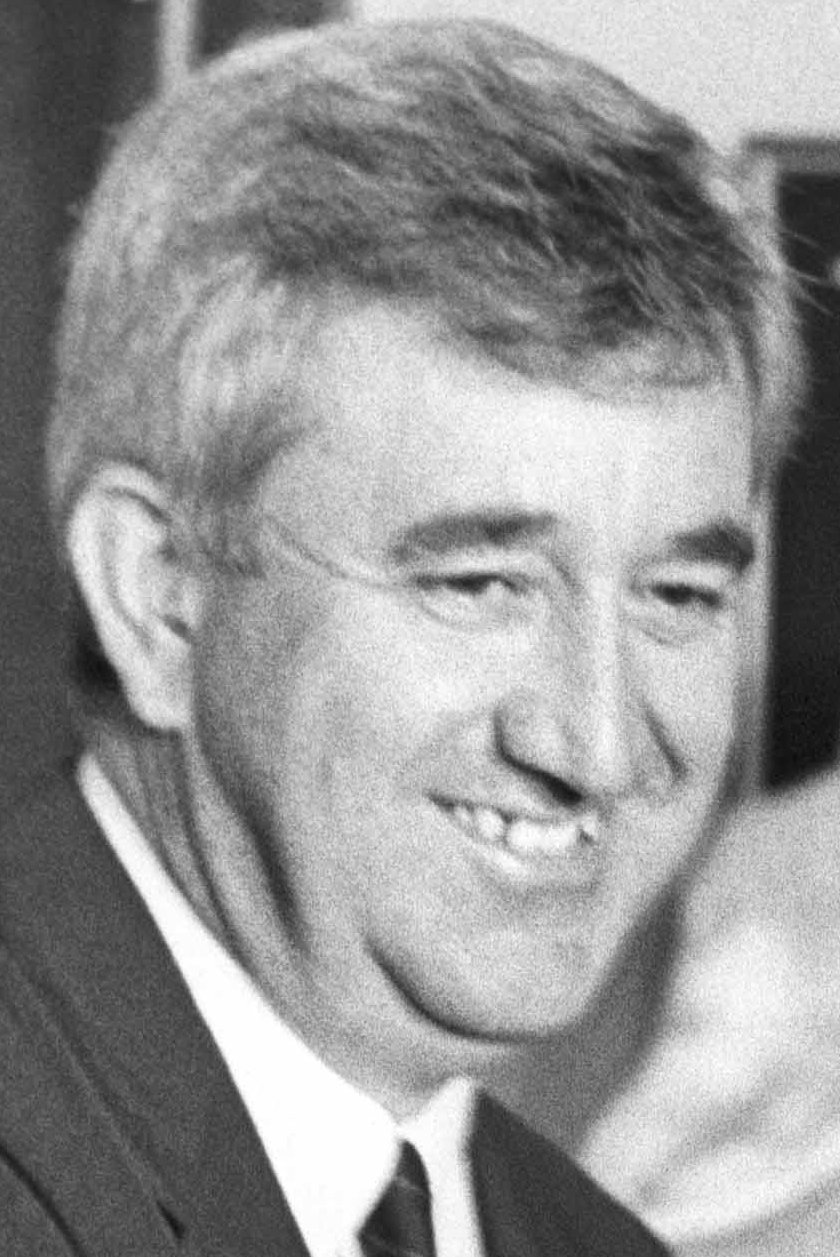

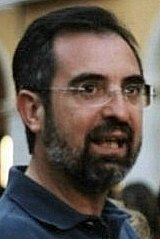

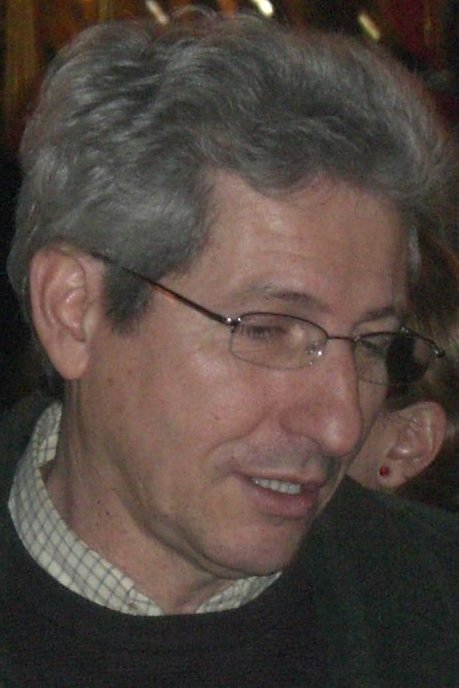

	First party	Second party	Third party
Leader	Gabriel Cañellas	Joan Francesc Triay	Pere Sampol
Party	PP	PSIB–PSOE	PSM–ENE
Leader since	1980	1986	1991
Leader's seat	Mallorca	Mallorca	Mallorca
Last election	31 seats, 47.1% (Note: Results for PP–UM in the 1991 election, not including Formentera.)	21 seats, 30.1%	5 seats, 8.4% (Note: Results for PSM–NM (6.6%, 3 seats), PSM–EU (1.4%, 2 seats) and ENE (0.4%, 0 seats) in the 1991 election.)
Seats won	30	16	6
Seat change	▼1	▼5	▲1
Popular vote	168,156	90,008	45,854
Percentage	44.8%	24.0%	12.2%
Swing	▼2.3 pp	▼6.1 pp	▲3.8 pp
	Fourth party	Fifth party	Sixth party
Leader	Eberhard Grosske	Maria Antònia Munar	Miquel Àngel Lladó
Party	IU	UM	EVIB
Leader since	1991	1 July 1991	February 1995
Leader's seat	Mallorca	Mallorca	Mallorca (lost)
Last election	0 seats, 2.3%	1 seat, 2.5% (Note: Results for UIM–IM in the 1991 election.)	0 seats, 2.1%
Seats won	3	2	1
Seat change	▲3	▲1	▲1
Popular vote	24,820	19,966	11,663
Percentage	6.6%	5.3%	3.1%
Swing	▲4.3 pp	▲2.8 pp	▲1.0 pp
	Seventh party
Leader	Joan Masdeu
Party	AIPF
Leader since	1995
Leader's seat	Formentera
Last election	0 seats, 0.4% (Note: Results for PP in Formentera in the 1991 election.)
Seats won	1
Seat change	▲1
Popular vote	1,195
Percentage	0.3%
Swing	▼0.1 pp
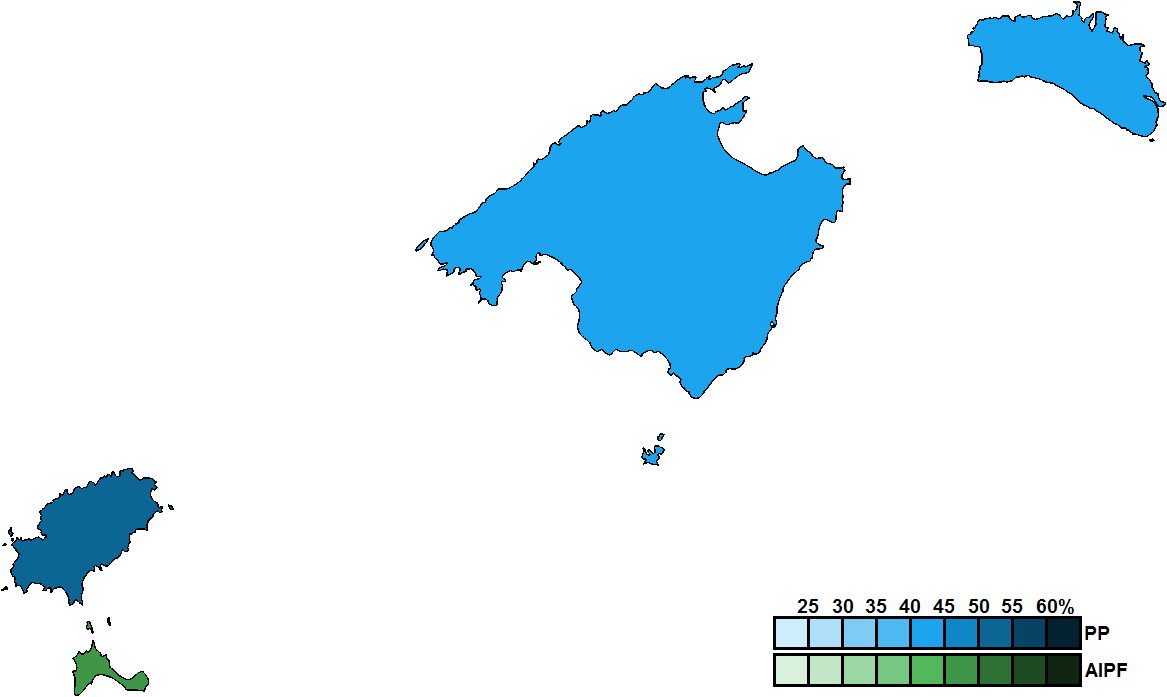
- Constituency results map for the Parliament of the Balearic Islands
President before election
Gabriel Cañellas
PP
President after election
Gabriel Cañellas
PP

A regional election was held in the Balearic Islands on 28 May 1995 to elect the 4th Parliament of the autonomous community. All 59 seats in the Parliament were up for election. It was held concurrently with regional elections in twelve other autonomous communities and local elections all across Spain.

== Overview ==
Under the 1983 Statute of Autonomy, the Parliament of the Balearic Islands was the unicameral legislature of the homonymous autonomous community, having legislative power in devolved matters, as well as the ability to grant or withdraw confidence from a regional president. The electoral and procedural rules were supplemented by national law provisions.

=== Date ===
The term of the Parliament of the Balearic Islands expired four years after the date of its previous ordinary election, with election day being fixed for the fourth Sunday of May every four years. The election decree was required to be issued no later than 54 days before the scheduled election date and published on the following day in the Official Gazette of the Balearic Islands (BOIB). The previous election was held on 26 May 1991, setting the date for election day on the fourth Sunday of May four years later, which was 28 May 1995.

The Parliament of the Balearic Islands could not be dissolved before the expiration date of parliament, except in the event of an investiture process failing to elect a regional president within a 60-day period from the Parliament's reconvening. In such a case, the chamber was to be automatically dissolved and a snap election called, with elected lawmakers serving the remainder of its original four-year term.

The election to the Parliament of the Balearic Islands was officially called on 4 April 1995 with the publication of the corresponding decree in the BOIB, setting election day for 28 May and scheduling for the chamber to reconvene on 21 June.

=== Electoral system ===
Voting for the Parliament was based on universal suffrage, comprising all Spanish nationals over 18 years of age, registered in the Balearic Islands and with full political rights, provided that they had not been deprived of the right to vote by a final sentence, nor were legally incapacitated.

The Parliament of the Balearic Islands had 59 seats. All were elected in four multi-member constituencies—corresponding to the islands of Mallorca, Menorca, Ibiza and Formentera, each of which was assigned a fixed number of seats—using the D'Hondt method and closed-list proportional voting, with a five percent-threshold of valid votes (including blank ballots) in each constituency. The use of this electoral method resulted in a higher effective threshold depending on district magnitude and vote distribution.

As a result of the aforementioned allocation, each Parliament constituency was entitled the following seats:

Seats	Constituencies
33	Mallorca
13	Menorca
12	Ibiza
1	Formentera

The law did not provide for by-elections to fill vacant seats; instead, any vacancies arising after the proclamation of candidates and during the legislative term were filled by the next candidates on the party lists or, when required, by designated substitutes.

=== Outgoing parliament ===
The table below shows the composition of the parliamentary groups in the chamber at the time of the election call.

Parliamentary composition in April 1995
Groups	Parties	Legislators	
Groups	Parties	Seats	Total
People's Parliamentary Group	PP	29	29
Socialist Parliamentary Group	PSIB–PSOE	20	20
PSM–EEM Parliamentary Group	PSM	3	5
PSM–EEM Parliamentary Group	PSMe	2	5
Mixed Parliamentary Group	UM	3	5
Mixed Parliamentary Group	FIEF	1	5
Mixed Parliamentary Group	INDEP	1 (Note: Jaume Peralta, former PSIB–PSOE legislator.)	5

== Opinion polls ==
The tables below list opinion polling results in reverse chronological order, showing the most recent first and using the dates when the survey fieldwork was done, as opposed to the date of publication. Where the fieldwork dates are unknown, the date of publication is given instead. The highest percentage figure in each polling survey is displayed with its background shaded in the leading party's colour. If a tie ensues, this is applied to the figures with the highest percentages. The "Lead" column on the right shows the percentage-point difference between the parties with the highest percentages in a poll.

=== Voting intention estimates ===
The table below lists weighted voting intention estimates. Refusals are generally excluded from the party vote percentages, while question wording and the treatment of "don't know" responses and those not intending to vote may vary between polling organisations. When available, seat projections determined by the polling organisations are displayed below (or in place of) the percentages in a smaller font; 30 seats were required for an absolute majority in the Parliament of the Balearic Islands.

Color key:

Exit poll

Polling firm/Commissioner	Fieldwork date	Sample size	Turnout	PP	PSIB–PSOE	PSM	EUIB	EVIB	PSMe	UM	AIPF	Lead
1995 regional election	28 May 1995	—N/a	63.6	44.8; 30	24.0; 16	12.2; 6	6.6; 3	3.1; 1	(Note: Within PSM.)	5.3; 2	0.3; 1	20.8
Eco Consulting/RTVE	28 May 1995	?	?	45.8; 30/32	21.9; 14/16	11.5; 5/6	8.1; 3/6	–		? 2	(Note: Within PP.)	23.9
Demoscopia/El País	10–15 May 1995	448	?	56.0; 38	19.3; 11	8.7; 4	8.3; 6	–				36.7
CIS (Note: "Preelectoral Comunidad Autónoma de Baleares (Estudio 2162. Abril-Mayo 1995)". CIS (in Spanish). 10 May 1995. Archived from the original on 25 May 2019.)	24 Apr–10 May 1995	498	67.6	51.8	26.9	7.2	6.1	–		1.9		24.9
1994 EP election	12 Jun 1994	—N/a	49.8	50.6	24.8	6.0	9.9	–	–	2.6	–	25.8
1993 general election	6 Jun 1993	—N/a	72.6	46.4	34.0	4.9	6.0	2.2		2.4	–	12.4
1991 regional election	26 May 1991	—N/a	60.3	47.3; 31	30.1; 21	6.6; 3	2.3; 0	2.1; 0	1.4 (Note: Result for PSM–EU.); 2		–	17.2

== Results ==
=== Overall ===
← Summary of the 28 May 1995 Parliament of the Balearic Islands election results →
Parties and alliances	Popular vote			Seats	
Parties and alliances	Votes	%	±pp	Total	+/−
People's Party (PP)^{1}	168,156	44.77	−2.35	30	−1
Socialist Party of the Balearic Islands (PSIB–PSOE)	90,008	23.97	−6.12	16	−5
Nationalists of the Balearic Islands (PSM–ENE)	45,854	12.21	+3.79	6	+1
Socialist Party of Mallorca–Nationalists of Mallorca (PSM–NM)	41,242	10.98	+4.34	5	+2
Socialist Party of Menorca–Nationalists of the Islands (PSM–NI)^{2}	4,013	1.07	−0.30	1	−1
Nationalist and Ecologist Agreement (ENE)	599	0.16	−0.25	0	±0
United Left (IU)	24,820	6.61	+4.33	3	+3
Majorcan Union (UM)^{3}	19,966	5.32	+2.83	2	+1
The Greens of the Balearic Islands (EVIB)	11,663	3.11	+0.99	1	+1
Republican Left of Catalonia (ERC)	2,082	0.55	New	0	±0
Balearic Convergence (CB)	1,600	0.43	−1.20	0	±0
Independent Social Group (ASI)	1,425	0.38	New	0	±0
Independents of Ibiza and Formentera Federation (FIEF)	1,359	0.36	−0.37	0	−1
Independent Popular Council of Formentera (AIPF)^{4}	1,195	0.32	−0.08	1	+1
Independents of Menorca (INME)	987	0.26	New	0	±0
Spanish Phalanx of the CNSO (FE–JONS)	439	0.12	−0.06	0	±0
Platform of Independents of Spain (PIE)	378	0.10	New	0	±0
Neighborhood Movement–New Socialist Party (MV–NPS)^{5}	321	0.09	−0.09	0	±0
Balearic Radical Party (PRB)	219	0.06	−0.10	0	±0
Blank ballots	5,100	1.36	+0.49		
Total	375,572			59	±0
Valid votes	375,572	99.37	−0.01		
Invalid votes	2,371	0.63	+0.01		
Votes cast / turnout	377,943	63.56	+3.29		
Abstentions	216,723	36.44	−3.29		
Registered voters	594,666				
Sources
Footnotes: ^{1} People's Party results are compared to the combined totals of People's Party–Majorcan Union and People's Party in the 1991 election, not including results in Formentera.; ^{2} Socialist Party of Menorca–Nationalists of the Islands results are compared to Agreement of the Left of Menorca totals in the 1991 election.; ^{3} Majorcan Union results are compared to Independent Union of Mallorca–Independents of Mallorca totals in the 1991 election.; ^{4} Independent Popular Council of Formentera results are compared to the combined totals of People's Party in Formentera and Independents of Formentera Group in the 1991 election.; ^{5} Neighborhood Movement–New Socialist Party results are compared to Alliance for the Republic totals in the 1991 election.

Popular vote
PP	44.77%
PSIB–PSOE	23.97%
PSM–ENE	12.21%
IU	6.61%
UM	5.32%
EVIB	3.11%
AIPF	0.32%
Others	2.35%
Blank ballots	1.36%

Seats
PP	50.85%
PSIB–PSOE	27.12%
PSM–ENE	10.17%
IU	5.08%
UM	3.39%
EVIB	1.69%
AIPF	1.69%

=== Distribution by constituency ===
Constituency	PP		PSIB		PSM–ENE		IU		UM		EVIB		AIPF	
Constituency	%	S	%	S	%	S	%	S	%	S	%	S	%	S
Formentera			44.1	−			4.5	−					49.4	1
Ibiza	50.6	7	28.1	4	1.9	−	6.0	−			6.9	1		
Mallorca	44.6	16	22.8	8	13.4	5	6.5	2	6.5	2	3.1	−		
Menorca	44.2	7	29.4	4	11.9	1	8.6	1						
Total	44.8	30	24.0	16	12.2	6	6.6	3	5.3	2	3.1	1	0.3	1

== Aftermath ==
=== Government formation ===
Investiture; Nomination of Gabriel Cañellas (PP)
Ballot →	29 June 1995
Required majority →	30 out of 59
Yes: • PP (30); • AIPF (1)	31 / 59
No: • PSIB (16); • PSM–PSMe (6); • IU–EV (4); • UM (2)	28 / 59
Abstentions	0 / 59
Absentees	0 / 59

=== July 1995 investiture ===
Investiture; Nomination of Cristòfol Soler (PP)
Ballot →	28 July 1995
Required majority →	30 out of 59
Yes: • PP (30); • AIPF (1)	31 / 59
No: • PSIB (16); • PSM–PSMe (6); • IU–EV (4)	26 / 59
Abstentions: • UM (2)	2 / 59
Absentees	0 / 59

=== 1996 investiture ===
Investiture; Nomination of Jaume Matas (PP)
Ballot →	12 June 1996	14 June 1996
Required majority →	30 out of 59	Simple
Yes: • PP (29) (28 on 12 Jun); • AIPF (1)	29 / 59	30 / 59
No: • PSIB (16); • PSM–PSMe (6); • IU–EV (4); • UM (2)	28 / 59	28 / 59
Abstentions: • PP (2) (1 on 14 Jun)	2 / 59	1 / 59
Absentees	0 / 59	0 / 59

== Bibliography ==
- Ley Orgánica 2/1983, de 25 de febrero, de Estatuto de Autonomía para las islas Baleares (Organic Law 2/1983). Official State Gazette (in Spanish). 1 March 1983. BOE-A-1983-6316.
- Ley 5/1984, de 24 de octubre, de Régimen Jurídico de la Administración de la Comunidad Autónoma de las Islas Baleares (Law 5/1984). Official State Gazette (in Spanish). 24 October 1984. BOE-A-1985-3470.
- Ley Orgánica 5/1985, de 19 de junio, del Régimen Electoral General (Organic Law 5/1985). Official State Gazette (in Spanish). 19 June 1985 [version as of 24 March 1995]. BOE-A-1985-11672.
- Ley 8/1986, de 26 de noviembre, Electoral de la Comunidad Autónoma de las Islas Baleares (Law 8/1986). Official State Gazette (in Spanish). 26 November 1986 [version as of 25 March 1995]. BOE-A-1987-2903.
- Decreto 31/1995, de 3 de abril, de convocatoria de las elecciones al Parlamento de las Islas Baleares (PDF) (Decree 31/1995). Official State Gazette (in Spanish). 3 April 1995.
