= Ibiza (Parliament of the Balearic Islands constituency) =

Coordinates: 38°59′N 1°26′W

- Parliament of the Balearic Islands; Electoral constituency
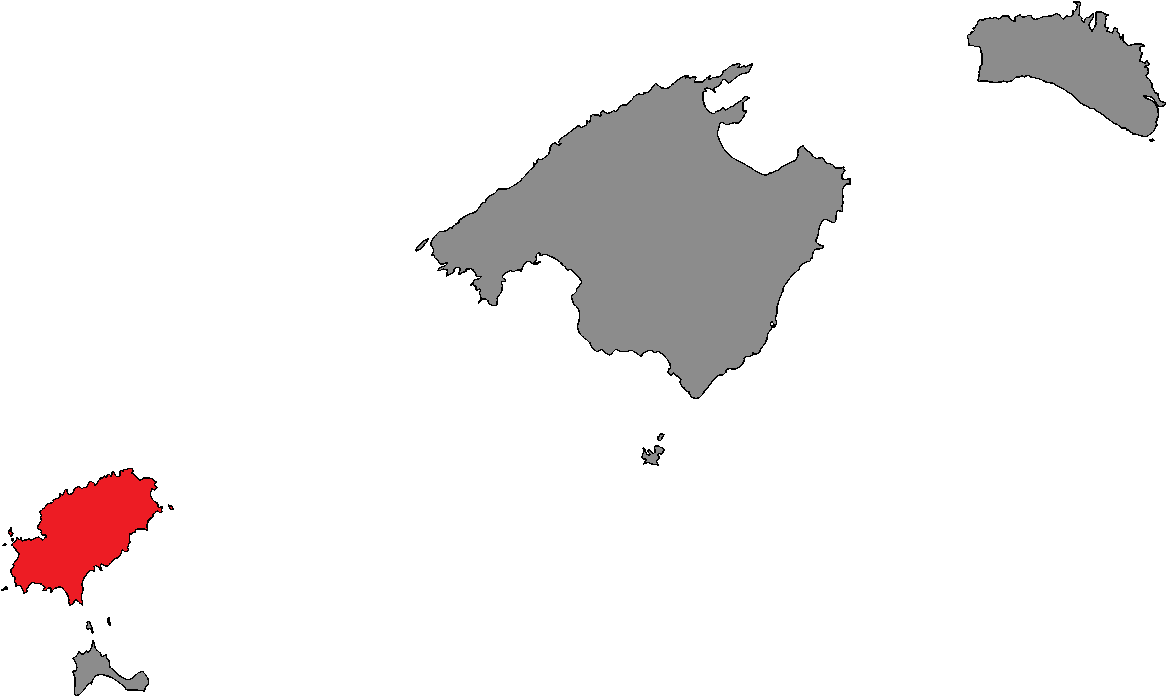
- Location of Ibiza within the Balearic Islands
- Island: Ibiza
- Autonomous community: Balearic Islands
- Population: ▲160,644 (2024)
- Electorate: ▲98,726 (2023)
- Major settlements: Ibiza, Santa Eulària des Riu

Current constituency
- Created: 1983
- Seats: 11 (1983–1987); 12 (1987–present)
- Members: PP (7); PSIB (4); Vox (1)

Ibiza (Catalan: Eivissa) is one of the four constituencies (Spanish: circunscripciones) represented in the Parliament of the Balearic Islands, the regional legislature of the Autonomous Community of the Balearic Islands. The constituency currently elects 12 deputies. Its boundaries correspond to those of the island of Ibiza. The electoral system uses the D'Hondt method and closed-list proportional representation, with a minimum threshold of five percent.

Until the 2003 election, the results in this district were also used to determine the composition of the Island Council of Ibiza and Formentera during the same term as the Parliament, with Ibiza counting for 12 out of the 13 seats of the Council—11 out of 12 from 1983 to 1987—. From the 2007 election onwards, a separate election is held, also having both Ibiza and Formentera independent Councils, the Island Council of Ibiza electing 13 members. Additionally, on 3 April 1979 the first independent election for the Island Council of Ibiza and Formentera was held, electing 12 councillors.

== Electoral system ==
The constituency was created as per the Statute of Autonomy of the Balearic Islands of 1983 and was first contested in the 1983 regional election. The Statute provided for the four main islands in the Balearic archipelago—Majorca, Menorca, Ibiza and Formentera—to be established as multi-member districts in the Parliament of the Balearic Islands, with this regulation being maintained under the 1986 regional electoral law. Each constituency is allocated a fixed number of seats: 33 for Majorca, 13 for Menorca, 12 for Ibiza and 1 for Formentera. The exception was the 1983 election, when these numbers were 30, 12, 11 and 1, respectively.

Voting is on the basis of universal suffrage, which comprises all nationals over eighteen, registered in the Balearic Islands and in full enjoyment of their political rights. Amendments to the electoral law in 2011 required for Balearic citizens abroad to apply for voting before being permitted to vote, a system known as "begged" or expat vote (Spanish: Voto rogado) which was abolished in 2022. Seats are elected using the D'Hondt method and a closed list proportional representation, with an electoral threshold of five percent of valid votes—which includes blank ballots; until a 1995 reform, the threshold was set at three percent—being applied in each constituency. The use of the D'Hondt method may result in a higher effective threshold, depending on the district magnitude.

The electoral law allows for parties and federations registered in the interior ministry, coalitions and groupings of electors to present lists of candidates. Parties and federations intending to form a coalition ahead of an election are required to inform the relevant Electoral Commission within ten days of the election call—fifteen before 1985—whereas groupings of electors need to secure the signature of at least one percent of the electorate in the constituencies for which they seek election—one-thousandth of the electorate, with a compulsory minimum of 500 signatures, until 1985—disallowing electors from signing for more than one list of candidates.

== Deputies ==
Deputies 1983–present
Key to parties Podemos–EUIB Podemos/Podem EV Pacte PSOE–ExC PSOE–PxE PSIB–PSOE FIEF CDS Cs PDL PP CP AP–PL Vox
Parliament	Election	Distribution
1st	1983	4 / 1 / 6
2nd	1987	4 / 1 / 7
3rd	1991	4 / 1 / 7
4th	1995	1 / 4 / 7
5th	1999	6 / 6
6th	2003	5 / 7
7th	2007	6 / 6
8th	2011	4 / 8
9th	2015	3 / 4 / 5
10th	2019	1 / 5 / 1 / 5
11th	2023	4 / 7 / 1

== Regional elections ==
=== 2023 ===
Summary of the 28 May 2023 Parliament of the Balearic Islands election results in Ibiza
Parties and alliances	Popular vote			Seats	
Parties and alliances	Votes	%	±pp	Total	+/−
People's Party (PP)	21,786	48.82	+16.29	7	+2
Socialist Party of the Balearic Islands (PSIB–PSOE)	11,439	25.63	–4.86	4	–1
Vox (Vox)	4,112	9.21	+4.17	1	+1
United We Can (EUIB–Podemos)	2,853	6.39	–5.25	0	–1
Now Ibiza (Ara Eivissa)	1,407	3.15	+0.43	0	±0
Progress in Green–PACMA (Progreso en Verde–PACMA)^{1}	662	1.48	–0.26	0	±0
Citizens–Party of the Citizenry (CS)	612	1.37	–7.42	0	–1
EPIC Ibiza Citizen Movement–El Pi (EPIC–El Pi)^{2}	597	1.34	–4.71	0	±0
For the Balearics (PerxB)	424	0.95	New	0	±0
Blank ballots	734	1.64	+0.64		
Total	44,626			12	±0
Valid votes	44,626	98.56	–0.87		
Invalid votes	650	1.44	+0.87		
Votes cast / turnout	45,276	45.86	–2.31		
Abstentions	53,450	54.14	+2.31		
Registered voters	98,726				
Sources
Footnotes: ^{1} Progress in Green–PACMA results are compared to Animalist Party Against Mistreatment of Animals totals in the 2019 election.; ^{2} EPIC Ibiza Citizen Movement–El Pi results are compared to the combined totals of Proposal for Ibiza and EPIC Ibiza Citizen Movement in the 2019 election.

=== 2019 ===
Summary of the 26 May 2019 Parliament of the Balearic Islands election results in Ibiza
Parties and alliances	Popular vote			Seats	
Parties and alliances	Votes	%	±pp	Total	+/−
People's Party (PP)	14,809	32.53	–0.36	5	±0
Socialist Party of the Balearic Islands (PSIB–PSOE)	13,882	30.49	+6.80	5	+1
United We Can (Podemos–EUIB)^{1}	5,299	11.64	–5.64	1	–2
Citizens–Party of the Citizenry (Cs)	4,001	8.79	New	1	+1
Vox–Citizen Alternative for Tolerance, Unity and Action (Vox–ACTUA Baleares)	2,295	5.04	New	0	±0
Proposal for Ibiza (PxE)^{2}	1,748	3.84	–6.09	0	±0
Now Ibiza–Let's Win the Left (Ara)^{3}	1,239	2.72	–2.22	0	±0
EPIC Ibiza Citizen Movement (MC EPIC)	1,006	2.21	–0.09	0	±0
Animalist Party Against Mistreatment of Animals (PACMA)	790	1.74	New	0	±0
Blank ballots	454	1.00	–1.47		
Total	45,523			12	±0
Valid votes	45,523	99.43	+0.69		
Invalid votes	263	0.57	–0.69		
Votes cast / turnout	45,786	48.17	–0.10		
Abstentions	49,257	51.83	+0.10		
Registered voters	95,043				
Sources
Footnotes: ^{1} United We Can results are compared to We Can totals in the 2015 election.; ^{2} Proposal for Ibiza results are compared to the combined totals of El Pi–Proposal for the Isles, More Ibiza–Democratic Corsairs and Island Alternative in the 2015 election.; ^{3} Now Ibiza–Let's Win the Left results are compared to the combined totals of Let's Win the Balearic Islands and Republican Left–Ibiza Yes in the 2015 election.

=== 2015 ===
Summary of the 24 May 2015 Parliament of the Balearic Islands election results in Ibiza
Parties and alliances	Popular vote			Seats	
Parties and alliances	Votes	%	±pp	Total	+/−
People's Party (PP)	14,287	32.89	–16.94	5	–3
Socialist Party of the Balearic Islands (PSIB–PSOE)^{1}	10,292	23.69	n/a	4	+1
We Can (Podemos/Podem)	7,508	17.28	New	3	+3
El Pi–Proposal for the Isles (El Pi)	2,486	5.72	New	0	±0
People for Ibiza (GxE)^{1}	1,680	3.86	n/a	0	±0
Let's Win the Balearic Islands (Guanyem)^{2}	1,383	3.18	–4.71	0	±0
More Ibiza–Democratic Corsairs (MEC)	1,042	2.39	New	0	±0
EPIC Ibiza Citizen Movement (mcEPIC)	1,000	2.30	New	0	±0
Island Alternative (AL–in)^{3}	794	1.82	–2.41	0	±0
Republican Left–Ibiza Yes (ER–Eivissa Sí)^{1}	766	1.76	n/a	0	–1
Union, Progress and Democracy (UPyD)	733	1.68	–0.70	0	±0
Renewal Party of Ibiza and Formentera (PREF)	396	0.91	New	0	±0
Blank ballots	1,071	2.47	–1.46		
Total	43,438			12	±0
Valid votes	43,438	98.74	+0.52		
Invalid votes	556	1.26	–0.52		
Votes cast / turnout	43,994	48.27	–3.01		
Abstentions	47,144	51.73	+3.01		
Registered voters	91,188				
Sources
Footnotes: ^{1} Within the PSOE–Pact for Ibiza alliance in the 2011 election.; ^{2} Let's Win the Balearic Islands results are compared to the combined totals of Ibiza for Change, Sustainable Ibiza and Nationalist and Ecologist Agreement in the 2011 election.; ^{3} Island Alternative results are compared to New Alternative totals in the 2011 election.

=== 2011 ===
Summary of the 22 May 2011 Parliament of the Balearic Islands election results in Ibiza
Parties and alliances	Popular vote			Seats	
Parties and alliances	Votes	%	±pp	Total	+/−
People's Party (PP)	20,690	49.83	+2.70	8	+2
PSOE–Pact for Ibiza (PSOE–PxE)^{1}	12,716	30.63	n/a	4	–1
Ibiza for Change (ExC)^{1}	2,061	4.96	n/a	0	–1
New Alternative (Nov–A)	1,755	4.23	New	0	±0
Union, Progress and Democracy (UPyD)	989	2.38	New	0	±0
Sustainable Ibiza (ESOS)	908	2.19	New	0	±0
Nationalist and Ecologist Agreement (ENE)^{1}	568	1.37	n/a	0	±0
Anti-Bullfighting Party Against Mistreatment of Animals (PACMA)	202	0.49	New	0	±0
Blank ballots	1,632	3.86	+1.36		
Total	41,521			12	±0
Valid votes	41,521	98.22	–1.14		
Invalid votes	752	1.78	+1.14		
Votes cast / turnout	42,273	51.28	–3.21		
Abstentions	40,166	48.72	+3.21		
Registered voters	82,439				
Sources
Footnotes: ^{1} Within the PSOE–Ibiza for Change alliance in the 2007 election.

=== 2007 ===
Summary of the 27 May 2007 Parliament of the Balearic Islands election results in Ibiza
Parties and alliances	Popular vote			Seats	
Parties and alliances	Votes	%	±pp	Total	+/−
People's Party (PP)	19,641	47.13	–3.28	6	–1
PSOE–Ibiza for Change (PSOE–ExC)^{1}	19,094	45.82	+4.74	6	+1
European Green Group (GVE)	876	2.10	+1.19	0	±0
Pityusic Democracy (DP)	675	1.62	New	0	±0
Civic Union (UC)	342	0.82	–1.01	0	±0
Blank ballots	1,043	2.50	+0.21		
Total	41,671			12	±0
Valid votes	41,671	99.36	+0.24		
Invalid votes	269	0.64	–0.24		
Votes cast / turnout	41,940	54.49	–3.18		
Abstentions	35,029	45.51	+3.18		
Registered voters	76,969				
Sources
Footnotes: ^{1} PSOE–Ibiza for Change results are compared to the combined totals of Progressive Pact and The Greens of Ibiza in the 2003 election.

=== 2003 ===
Summary of the 25 May 2003 Parliament of the Balearic Islands election results in Ibiza
Parties and alliances	Popular vote			Seats	
Parties and alliances	Votes	%	±pp	Total	+/−
People's Party (PP)	20,668	50.41	+3.27	7	+1
Progressive Pact (Pacte)	15,513	37.84	–8.49	5	–1
The Greens of Ibiza (EV–Eiv)	1,330	3.24	New	0	±0
Independent Social Group (ASI)	956	2.33	New	0	±0
Civic Union (UC)	751	1.83	–0.90	0	±0
European Green Group (GVE)	373	0.91	New	0	±0
Renewal Party of Ibiza and Formentera (PREF)	335	0.82	New	0	±0
Balearic Islands Renewal Party (PRIB)	131	0.32	New	0	±0
Blank ballots	939	2.29	+0.33		
Total	40,996			12	±0
Valid votes	40,996	99.12	+0.15		
Invalid votes	362	0.88	–0.15		
Votes cast / turnout	41,358	57.67	+2.32		
Abstentions	30,361	42.33	–2.32		
Registered voters	71,719				

=== 1999 ===
Summary of the 13 June 1999 Parliament of the Balearic Islands election results in Ibiza
Parties and alliances	Popular vote			Seats	
Parties and alliances	Votes	%	±pp	Total	+/−
People's Party (PP)	16,443	47.14	–3.49	6	–1
Progressive Pact (Pacte)^{1}	16,161	46.33	+2.62	6	+1
Pityusic Civic Union (UCP)	954	2.73	New	0	±0
The Greens–Green Group (LV–GV)	643	1.84	New	0	±0
Blank ballots	683	1.96	+0.48		
Total	34,884			12	±0
Valid votes	34,884	98.97	–0.28		
Invalid votes	362	1.03	+0.28		
Votes cast / turnout	35,246	55.35	+0.23		
Abstentions	28,429	44.65	–0.23		
Registered voters	63,675				
Sources
Footnotes: ^{1} Progressive Pact results are compared to the combined totals of Socialist Party of the Balearic Islands, The Greens, United Left of Ibiza, Nationalist and Ecologist Agreement and Republican Left of Catalonia in the 1995 election.

=== 1995 ===
Summary of the 28 May 1995 Parliament of the Balearic Islands election results in Ibiza
Parties and alliances	Popular vote			Seats	
Parties and alliances	Votes	%	±pp	Total	+/−
People's Party (PP)	16,421	50.63	+1.14	7	±0
Socialist Party of the Balearic Islands (PSIB–PSOE)	9,118	28.11	–3.71	4	±0
The Greens (EV)	2,241	6.91	New	1	+1
United Left of Ibiza (IU)	1,939	5.98	+3.50	0	±0
Independents of Ibiza and Formentera Federation (FIEF)	1,359	4.19	–4.14	0	–1
Nationalist and Ecologist Agreement (ENE)	599	1.85	–2.85	0	±0
Republican Left of Catalonia (ERC)	278	0.86	New	0	±0
Blank ballots	480	1.48	+0.68		
Total	32,435			12	±0
Valid votes	32,435	99.25	–0.20		
Invalid votes	246	0.75	+0.20		
Votes cast / turnout	32,681	55.12	+1.28		
Abstentions	26,614	44.88	–1.28		
Registered voters	59,295				

=== 1991 ===
Summary of the 25 May 1991 Parliament of the Balearic Islands election results in Ibiza
Parties and alliances	Popular vote			Seats	
Parties and alliances	Votes	%	±pp	Total	+/−
People's Party (PP)^{1}	14,656	49.49	–3.86	7	±0
Socialist Party of the Balearic Islands (PSIB–PSOE)	9,422	31.82	–2.89	4	±0
Independents of Ibiza and Formentera Federation (FIEF)	2,468	8.33	New	1	+1
Nationalist and Ecologist Agreement (ENE)	1,392	4.70	New	0	±0
United Left (EU–IU)	735	2.48	–0.80	0	±0
Democratic and Social Centre (CDS)	444	1.50	–6.15	0	–1
Left Unitary Platform (PCE (m–l)–CRPE)	259	0.87	New	0	±0
Blank ballots	237	0.80	–0.20		
Total	29,613			12	±0
Valid votes	29,613	99.45	+0.41		
Invalid votes	165	0.55	–0.41		
Votes cast / turnout	29,778	53.84	–4.66		
Abstentions	25,533	46.16	+4.66		
Registered voters	55,311				
Sources
Footnotes: ^{1} People's Party results are compared to People's Alliance–Liberal Party totals in the 1987 election.

=== 1987 ===
Summary of the 10 June 1987 Parliament of the Balearic Islands election results in Ibiza
Parties and alliances	Popular vote			Seats	
Parties and alliances	Votes	%	±pp	Total	+/−
People's Alliance–Liberal Party (AP–PL)^{1}	14,289	53.35	+1.88	7	+1
Spanish Socialist Workers' Party (PSOE)	9,296	34.71	+4.04	4	±0
Democratic and Social Centre (CDS)	2,049	7.65	New	1	+1
United Left (EU–IU)^{2}	879	3.28	–0.44	0	±0
Liberal Democratic Party (PDL)	n/a	n/a	–14.62	0	–1
Blank ballots	269	1.00	+0.60		
Total	26,782			12	+1
Valid votes	26,782	99.04	+0.21		
Invalid votes	260	0.96	–0.21		
Votes cast / turnout	27,042	58.50	–0.01		
Abstentions	19,186	41.50	+0.01		
Registered voters	46,288				
Sources
Footnotes: ^{1} People's Alliance–Liberal Party results are compared to People's Coalition totals in the 1983 election.; ^{2} United Left results are compared to Communist Party of the Balearic Islands totals in the 1983 election.

=== 1983 ===
Summary of the 8 May 1983 Parliament of the Balearic Islands election results in Ibiza
Parties and alliances	Popular vote			Seats	
Parties and alliances	Votes	%	±pp	Total	+/−
People's Coalition (AP–PDP–UL)	12,878	51.47	n/a	6	n/a
Spanish Socialist Workers' Party (PSOE)	7,673	30.67	n/a	4	n/a
Liberal Democratic Party (PDL)	3,657	14.62	n/a	1	n/a
Communist Party of the Balearic Islands (PCIB)	712	2.84	n/a	0	n/a
Blank ballots	101	0.40	n/a		
Total	25,021			11	n/a
Valid votes	25,021	98.83	n/a		
Invalid votes	296	1.17	n/a		
Votes cast / turnout	25,317	58.51	n/a		
Abstentions	17,950	41.49	n/a		
Registered voters	43,267				
