= Formentera (Parliament of the Balearic Islands constituency) =

Coordinates: 38°42′N 1°27′W

- Parliament of the Balearic Islands; Electoral constituency
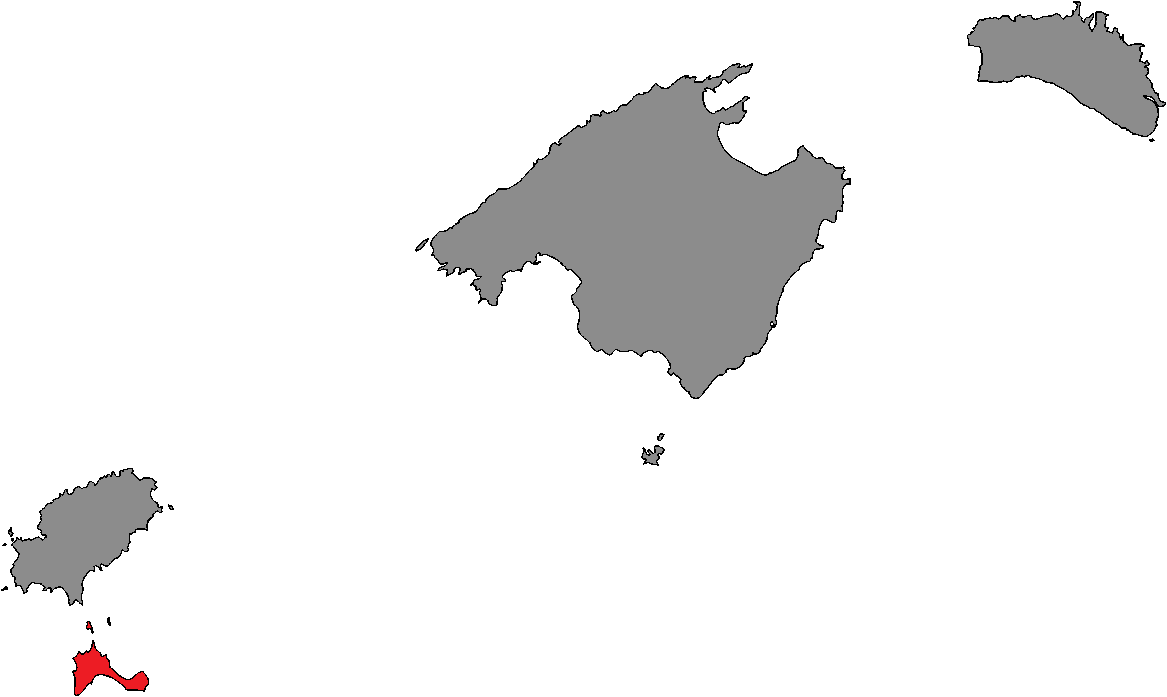
- Location of Formentera within the Balearic Islands
- Island: Formentera
- Autonomous community: Balearic Islands
- Population: ▲11,389 (2024)
- Electorate: ▼7,180 (2023)
- Major settlements: Sant Francesc Xavier

Current constituency
- Created: 1983
- Seats: 1
- Member: Sa Unió (1)

Formentera is one of the four constituencies (Spanish: circunscripciones) represented in the Parliament of the Balearic Islands, the regional legislature of the Autonomous Community of the Balearic Islands. The constituency currently elects one deputy using plurality voting. Its boundaries correspond to those of the island of Formentera.

Until the 2003 election, the results in this district were also used to determine the composition of the Island Council of Ibiza and Formentera during the same term as the Parliament, with Formentera counting for 1 out of the 13 seats of the Council—11 out of 12 from 1983 to 1987—. From the 2007 election onwards, Formentera has an independent Council, the composition of which is determined by the local elections of the municipality. Additionally, on 3 April 1979 the first independent election for the Island Council of Ibiza and Formentera was held, electing 12 councillors.

== Electoral system ==
The constituency was created as per the Statute of Autonomy of the Balearic Islands of 1983 and was first contested in the 1983 regional election. The Statute provided for the four main islands in the Balearic archipelago—Majorca, Menorca, Ibiza and Formentera—to be established as multi-member districts in the Parliament of the Balearic Islands, with this regulation being maintained under the 1986 regional electoral law. Each constituency is allocated a fixed number of seats: 33 for Majorca, 13 for Menorca, 12 for Ibiza and 1 for Formentera. The exception was the 1983 election, when these numbers were 30, 12, 11 and 1, respectively.

Voting is on the basis of universal suffrage, which comprises all nationals over eighteen, registered in the Balearic Islands and in full enjoyment of their political rights. Amendments to the electoral law in 2011 required for Balearic citizens abroad to apply for voting before being permitted to vote, a system known as "begged" or expat vote (Spanish: Voto rogado) which was abolished in 2022. Seats are elected using the D'Hondt method and a closed list proportional representation, with an electoral threshold of five percent of valid votes—which includes blank ballots; until a 1995 reform, the threshold was set at three percent—being applied in each constituency. The use of the D'Hondt method may result in a higher effective threshold, depending on the district magnitude.

The electoral law allows for parties and federations registered in the interior ministry, coalitions and groupings of electors to present lists of candidates. Parties and federations intending to form a coalition ahead of an election are required to inform the relevant Electoral Commission within ten days of the election call—fifteen before 1985—whereas groupings of electors need to secure the signature of at least one percent of the electorate in the constituencies for which they seek election—one-thousandth of the electorate, with a compulsory minimum of 500 signatures, until 1985—disallowing electors from signing for more than one list of candidates.

== Deputies ==
Deputies 1983–present
Key to parties COP GxF PSIB–PSOE AIPF Sa Unió
Parliament	Election	Distribution
1st	1983	1
2nd	1987	1
3rd	1991	1
4th	1995	1
5th	1999	1
6th	2003	1
7th	2007	1
8th	2011	1
9th	2015	1
10th	2019	1
11th	2023	1

== Regional elections ==
=== 2023 ===
Summary of the 28 May 2023 Parliament of the Balearic Islands election results in Formentera
Parties and alliances	Popular vote			Seats	
Parties and alliances	Votes	%	±pp	Total	+/−
The Union of Formentera (PP–CompromísFormentera) (Sa Unió)	1,747	46.55	+8.31	1	+1
People for Formentera+PSOE (GxF+PSOE)	1,679	44.74	–10.09	0	–1
Progress in Green–PACMA (Progreso en Verde–PACMA)^{1}	131	3.49	–1.84	0	±0
Vox (Vox)	125	3.33	New	0	±0
Blank ballots	71	1.89	+0.30		
Total	3,753			1	±0
Valid votes	3,753	98.43	–0.03		
Invalid votes	60	1.57	+0.03		
Votes cast / turnout	3,813	53.11	+3.02		
Abstentions	3,367	46.89	–3.02		
Registered voters	7,180				
Sources
Footnotes: ^{1} Progress in Green–PACMA results are compared to Animalist Party Against Mistreatment of Animals totals in the 2019 election.

=== 2019 ===
Summary of the 26 May 2019 Parliament of the Balearic Islands election results in Formentera
Parties and alliances	Popular vote			Seats	
Parties and alliances	Votes	%	±pp	Total	+/−
People for Formentera+PSOE+EUIB (GxF+PSOE+EUIB)	2,036	54.83	–4.46	1	±0
The Union of Formentera (PP–CompromísFormentera) (Sa Unió)^{1}	1,420	38.24	+0.20	0	±0
Animalist Party Against Mistreatment of Animals (PACMA)	198	5.33	New	0	±0
Blank ballots	59	1.59	–1.07		
Total	3,713			1	±0
Valid votes	3,713	98.46	+2.95		
Invalid votes	58	1.54	–2.95		
Votes cast / turnout	3,771	50.09	–0.08		
Abstentions	3,758	49.91	+0.08		
Registered voters	7,529				
Sources
Footnotes: ^{1} The Union of Formentera results are compared to the combined totals of People's Party and Commitment to Formentera in the 2015 election.

=== 2015 ===
Summary of the 24 May 2015 Parliament of the Balearic Islands election results in Formentera
Parties and alliances	Popular vote			Seats	
Parties and alliances	Votes	%	±pp	Total	+/−
People for Formentera+PSOE (GxF+PSOE)	2,006	59.29	+5.26	1	±0
People's Party (PP)^{1}	904	26.72	–11.67	0	±0
Commitment to Formentera (CompromísFormentera)	383	11.32	New	0	±0
Blank ballots	90	2.66	+0.49		
Total	3,383			1	±0
Valid votes	3,383	95.51	–2.62		
Invalid votes	159	4.49	+2.62		
Votes cast / turnout	3,542	50.17	–9.04		
Abstentions	3,518	49.83	+9.04		
Registered voters	7,060				
Sources
Footnotes: ^{1} People's Party results are compared to The Union of Formentera totals in the 2011 election.

=== 2011 ===
Summary of the 22 May 2011 Parliament of the Balearic Islands election results in Formentera
Parties and alliances	Popular vote			Seats	
Parties and alliances	Votes	%	±pp	Total	+/−
People for Formentera+PSOE (GxF+PSOE)	1,904	54.03	+9.84	1	+1
The Union of Formentera (PP–GUIF) (Sa Unió)^{1}	1,353	38.39	–16.09	0	–1
Renewal Party of Ibiza and Formentera (PREF)	135	3.83	New	0	±0
Anti-Bullfighting Party Against Mistreatment of Animals (PACMA)	54	1.53	New	0	±0
Blank ballots	78	2.17	+0.83		
Total	3,524			1	±0
Valid votes	3,524	98.13	–0.76		
Invalid votes	67	1.87	+0.76		
Votes cast / turnout	3,591	59.21	–4.05		
Abstentions	2,474	40.79	+4.05		
Registered voters	6,065				
Sources
Footnotes: ^{1} The Union of Formentera results are compared to Independent Popular Council of Formentera totals in the 2007 election.

=== 2007 ===
Summary of the 27 May 2007 Parliament of the Balearic Islands election results in Formentera
Parties and alliances	Popular vote			Seats	
Parties and alliances	Votes	%	±pp	Total	+/−
Independent Popular Council of Formentera (AIPF)	1,795	54.48	+1.09	1	±0
PSOE+People for Formentera (PSOE+GxF)^{1}	1,456	44.19	+2.12	0	±0
Blank ballots	44	1.34	–3.20		
Total	3,295			1	±0
Valid votes	3,295	98.89	+0.86		
Invalid votes	37	1.11	–0.86		
Votes cast / turnout	3,332	63.26	–3.63		
Abstentions	1,935	36.74	+3.63		
Registered voters	5,267				
Sources
Footnotes: ^{1} PSOE+People for Formentera results are compared to Coalition of Progressive Organizations totals in the 2003 election.

=== 2003 ===
Summary of the 25 May 2003 Parliament of the Balearic Islands election results in Formentera
Parties and alliances	Popular vote			Seats	
Parties and alliances	Votes	%	±pp	Total	+/−
Independent Popular Council of Formentera (AIPF)	1,647	53.39	+10.59	1	+1
Coalition of Progressive Organizations (COP)	1,298	42.07	–13.50	0	–1
Blank ballots	140	4.54	+2.91		
Total	3,085			1	±0
Valid votes	3,085	98.03	–0.23		
Invalid votes	62	1.97	+0.23		
Votes cast / turnout	3,147	66.89	–1.37		
Abstentions	1,558	33.11	+1.37		
Registered voters	4,705				

=== 1999 ===
Summary of the 13 June 1999 Parliament of the Balearic Islands election results in Formentera
Parties and alliances	Popular vote			Seats	
Parties and alliances	Votes	%	±pp	Total	+/−
Coalition of Progressive Organizations (COP)^{1}	1,536	55.57	+6.95	1	+1
Independent Popular Council of Formentera (AIPF)	1,183	42.80	–6.60	0	–1
Blank ballots	45	1.63	–0.35		
Total	2,764			1	±0
Valid votes	2,764	98.26	+0.64		
Invalid votes	49	1.74	–0.64		
Votes cast / turnout	2,813	68.26	+1.81		
Abstentions	1,308	31.74	–1.81		
Registered voters	4,121				
Sources
Footnotes: ^{1} Coalition of Progressive Organizations results are compared to the combined totals of Socialist Party of the Balearic Islands and United Left in the 1995 election.

=== 1995 ===
Summary of the 28 May 1995 Parliament of the Balearic Islands election results in Formentera
Parties and alliances	Popular vote			Seats	
Parties and alliances	Votes	%	±pp	Total	+/−
Independent Popular Council of Formentera (AIPF)^{1}	1,195	49.40	–8.32	1	+1
Socialist Party of the Balearic Islands (PSIB–PSOE)	1,067	44.11	+3.72	0	–1
United Left (IU)	109	4.51	New	0	±0
Blank ballots	48	1.98	+0.51		
Total	2,419			1	±0
Valid votes	2,419	97.62	–2.17		
Invalid votes	59	2.38	+2.17		
Votes cast / turnout	2,478	66.45	–0.71		
Abstentions	1,251	33.55	+0.71		
Registered voters	3,729				
Sources
Footnotes: ^{1} Independent Popular Council of Formentera results are compared to the combined totals of People's Party and Independents of Formentera Group in the 1991 election.

=== 1991 ===
Summary of the 25 May 1991 Parliament of the Balearic Islands election results in Formentera
Parties and alliances	Popular vote			Seats	
Parties and alliances	Votes	%	±pp	Total	+/−
Socialist Party of the Balearic Islands (PSIB–PSOE)	960	40.39	–6.39	1	±0
Independents of Formentera Group (GUIF)	692	29.11	New	0	±0
People's Party (PP)^{1}	680	28.61	–10.20	0	±0
Alliance for the Republic (AxR)	10	0.42	New	0	±0
Blank ballots	35	1.47	+0.70		
Total	2,377			1	±0
Valid votes	2,377	99.79	+0.67		
Invalid votes	5	0.21	–0.67		
Votes cast / turnout	2,382	67.16	–8.62		
Abstentions	1,165	32.84	+8.62		
Registered voters	3,547				
Sources
Footnotes: ^{1} People's Party results are compared to People's Alliance–Liberal Party totals in the 1987 election.

=== 1987 ===
Summary of the 10 June 1987 Parliament of the Balearic Islands election results in Formentera
Parties and alliances	Popular vote			Seats	
Parties and alliances	Votes	%	±pp	Total	+/−
Spanish Socialist Workers' Party (PSOE)	1,156	46.78	–2.31	1	±0
People's Alliance–Liberal Party (AP–PL)^{1}	959	38.81	–0.42	0	±0
Democratic and Social Centre (CDS)	337	13.64	New	0	±0
Blank ballots	19	0.77	+0.58		
Total	2,471			1	±0
Valid votes	2,471	99.12	+0.50		
Invalid votes	22	0.88	–0.50		
Votes cast / turnout	2,493	75.78	+2.96		
Abstentions	797	24.22	–2.96		
Registered voters	3,290				
Sources
Footnotes: ^{1} People's Alliance–Liberal Party results are compared to People's Coalition totals in the 1983 election.

=== 1983 ===
Summary of the 8 May 1983 Parliament of the Balearic Islands election results in Formentera
Parties and alliances	Popular vote			Seats	
Parties and alliances	Votes	%	±pp	Total	+/−
Spanish Socialist Workers' Party (PSOE)	1,021	49.09	n/a	1	n/a
People's Coalition (AP–PDP–UL)	816	39.23	n/a	0	n/a
Liberal Democratic Party (PDL)	239	11.49	n/a	0	n/a
Blank ballots	4	0.19	n/a		
Total	2,080			1	n/a
Valid votes	2,080	98.62	n/a		
Invalid votes	29	1.38	n/a		
Votes cast / turnout	2,109	72.82	n/a		
Abstentions	787	27.18	n/a		
Registered voters	2,896				
