= Parliament of the Balearic Islands =

Autonomous legislative body of the Balearic Islands, Spain

Coordinates: 39.5687°N 2.6481°E

Parliament of the Balearic Islands Parlament de les Illes Balears
- Balearic Islands unicameral legislature

Type
- Type: Spanish regional legislature
- Houses: Unicameral

Leadership
- President (Speaker): Gabriel Le Senne, Vox since 20 June 2023
- Vice President: Mauricio Rovira, PP since 20 June 2023
- Second Vice President: Mercedes Garrido, PSIB since 20 June 2023
- Secretary: Misericordia Sugrañes, PP since 20 June 2023
- Second Secretary: Pilar Costa, PSIB since 20 June 2023
- President of the Balearic Islands: Marga Prohens, PP since 7 July 2023
- Opposition Leader: Iago Negueruela, PSIB since 24 July 2023

Structure
- Seats: 59
- Political groups: Government (25): PP (25); Supported by (1): Sa Unió (1); Opposition (33): PSIB (18); Vox (5); Més (4); MxMe (2); Podemos (1); Independent (3) (Note: Xisco Cardona left Vox in 2023)
- Length of term: 4 years

Elections
- Last election: 28 May 2023

Meeting place
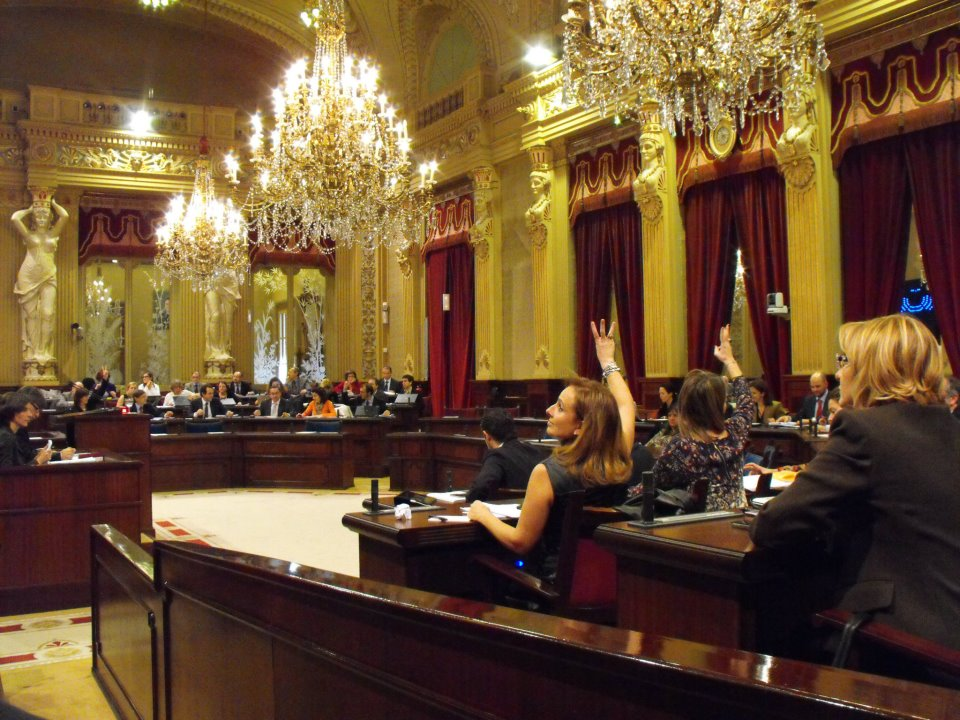
- The old El Cercle Mallorquí building, home of the Balearic Parliament.

Website
- www.parlamentib.cat

The Parliament of the Balearic Islands (Catalan: Parlament de les Illes Balears; Spanish: Parlamento de las Islas Baleares) is the unicameral autonomous parliament of the Balearic Islands, one of the autonomous communities of Spain. Composed of 59 elected seats, it sits in the city of Palma, on the island of Majorca.

== Precedents ==
=== Parliamentary Assembly of the Balearic Islands (1977–1978) ===
The Parliamentary Assembly of the Balearic Islands (Catalan: Assemblea de Parlamentaris de les Illes Balears) was an unofficial provisional body serving as pre-autonomic representation from 30 July 1977. It was composed by the eleven elected deputies and senators in the 1977 general election. Additionally, on 13 June 1978, the pre-autonomic regime decree installed the new Inter-island General Council, and two more representatives from Menorca and two more from the Pityusic Islands were elected. The President was Jeroni Albertí, member of the Union of the Democratic Centre (UCD). When the Inter-island General Council was constituted on 24 July 1978, the Parliamentary Assembly of the Balearic Islands was dissolved.

The composition of the Assembly was defined by the 1977 general election results in the Balearic Islands, which were the following:

Parliamentary Assembly of the Balearic Islands (30 July 1977 – 24 July 1978)
Parties	Dep	Senators			Total
Parties	Dep	Mall	Men	I–F	Total
UCD	4	2	1	0	7
PSOE	2	1	0	0	3
AP	0	0	0	1	1
Total	6	3	1	1	11

=== Inter-island General Council (1978–1983) ===
The 1978 Spanish Constitution anticipated the organisation of the State in Autonomous Communities. The different historic regions and nationalities could access to the autonomy through two ways; the so-called fast way (article 151) and the so-called slow or common way (article 143). During the process of achievement, the province or provinces could request to the Congress of Deputies the regime of preautonomy, as a transition period from the centralism to the self-government. On 13 June 1978 the Inter-island General Council (Catalan: Consell General Interinsular), preautonomous body for the Balearic Islands, was constituted by royal decree. It substituted the Provincial Council of the Balearics and possessed some of the basic competences in health and culture, although its main function was drafting a Statue of Autonomy for the archipelago. On a 17 July 1978 decree, the election of its members was defined. On 1 March 1983 the Statue of Autonomy of the Balearic Islands came into effect, and the Inter-island General Council disappeared, being replaced by the Government of the Balearic Islands.

During the five years of its existence, the institution had two presidents. Jeroni Albertí (UCD) resigned in 1982 before participating in the foundation of Majorcan Union (UM). The Menorcan Francesc Tutzó (UCD), who had been the vice-president, replaced Albertí, and governed the body until the 1983 regional election.

== Membership ==
Seats	Island Constituencies (Note: Since 1987)
33	Mallorca
13	Menorca
12	Ibiza
1	Formentera

=== Results of the elections to the Parliament of the Balearic Islands ===
Deputies in the Parliament of the Balearic Islands since 1983
Key to parties EUIB EU–EV Podemos United We Can–EUIB PSM PSM–PSI PSM–EU PSM–EN PSM–ENE PSM–EN EVIB Pacte+COP Bloc MpM Més GxF+PSOE PSOE–ExC PSOE–PxE PSIB–PSOE CIM FIEF El Pí AIPF CDS PDL UM UIM–IM Cs PP–UM Sa Unió PP CP AP–PL Vox
Election	Distribution	President
1983	2 / 2 / 21 / 1 / 1 / 6 / 21	Gabriel Cañellas (AP)
1987	2 / 2 / 21 / 5 / 4 / 25	Gabriel Cañellas (AP)
1991	2 / 3 / 21 / 1 / 1 / 31	Gabriel Cañellas (PP)
1995	3 / 1 / 6 / 16 / 2 / 1 / 30	Gabriel Cañellas (PP)
1995	3 / 1 / 6 / 16 / 2 / 1 / 30	Cristòfol Soler (PP)
1995	3 / 1 / 6 / 16 / 2 / 1 / 30	Jaume Matas (PP)
1999	3 / 5 / 7 / 13 / 3 / 28	Francesc Antich (PSIB–PSOE)
2003	2 / 4 / 5 / 15 / 3 / 1 / 29	Jaume Matas (PP)
2007	1 / 4 / 6 / 16 / 3 / 1 / 28	Francesc Antich (PSIB–PSOE)
2011	1 / 4 / 1 / 4 / 14 / 35	José Ramón Bauzá (PP)
2015	10 / 3 / 6 / 1 / 14 / 3 / 2 / 20	Francina Armengol (PSIB–PSOE)
2019	6 / 2 / 4 / 1 / 19 / 3 / 5 / 16 / 3	Francina Armengol (PSIB–PSOE)
2023	1 / 2 / 4 / 18 / 1 / 25 / 8	Marga Prohens (PP)

== Presidents of the Parliament of the Balearic Islands ==
Name (Birth–Death)	Term of office			Legislature	Political Party
Name (Birth–Death)	Took office	Left office	Days	Legislature	Political Party
=== Parliamentary Assembly of the Balearic Islands ===
Jeroni Albertí Picornell (1927–2024)	30 July 1977	24 July 1978	359	Pre-autonomic	Union of the Democratic Centre
=== Inter-island General Council ===
Jeroni Albertí Picornell (1927–2024)	24 July 1978	27 September 1982	1526	Pre-autonomic	Union of the Democratic Centre
Francesc Tutzó Bennàsar (b. 1940)	27 September 1982	10 June 1983	256	Pre-autonomic	Union of the Democratic Centre
=== Parliament of the Balearic Islands ===
Antoni Cirerol Thomàs (1926–2015)	10 June 1983	14 April 1987	1404	I (1983–1987)	People's Alliance
Jeroni Albertí Picornell (1927–2024)	31 July 1987	2 April 1991	1341	II (1987–1991)	Majorcan Union
Cristòfol Soler Cladera (b. 1956)	20 June 1991	4 April 1995	1416	III (1991–1995)	People's Party
Cristòfol Soler Cladera (b. 1956)	22 June 1995	24 July 1995	1416	IV (1995–1999)	People's Party
Joan Huguet Rotger (b. 1954)	31 July 1995	20 April 1999	1359	IV (1995–1999)	People's Party
Antoni Diéguez Seguí (b. 1954)	13 July 1999	4 August 1999	22	V (1999–2003)	Socialist Party of the Balearic Islands
Maximilià Morales Gómez (1948–2017)	4 August 1999	1 April 2003	1336	V (1999–2003)	Majorcan Union
Pere Rotger Llabrés (b. 1951)	19 June 2003	3 April 2007	1384	VI (2003–2007)	People's Party
Maria Antònia Munar Riutort (b. 1955)	26 June 2007	5 March 2010	983	VII (2007–2011)	Majorcan Union
Aina Rado Ferrando (1947–2017)	9 March 2010	29 March 2011	385	VII (2007–2011)	Socialist Party of the Balearic Islands
Pere Rotger Llabrés (b. 1951)	8 June 2011	14 December 2012	555	VIII (2011–2015)	People's Party
Margalida Duran Cladera (b. 1967)	18 December 2012	31 March 2015	833	VIII (2011–2015)	People's Party
María Consuelo Huertas Calatayud (b. 1959)	19 June 2015	25 January 2017	586	IX (2015–2019)	We Can
Baltasar Picornell Lladó (b. 1977)	14 February 2017	20 June 2019	856	IX (2015–2019)	We Can
Vicenç Thomàs Mulet (b. 1958)	20 June 2019	20 June 2023	1461	X (2019–2023)	Socialist Party of the Balearic Islands
Gabriel Le Senne (b. 1977)	20 June 2023	Incumbent	1223	XI (2023–)	Vox

== See also ==
- President of the Balearic Islands
