= Entesa de l'Esquerra de Menorca =

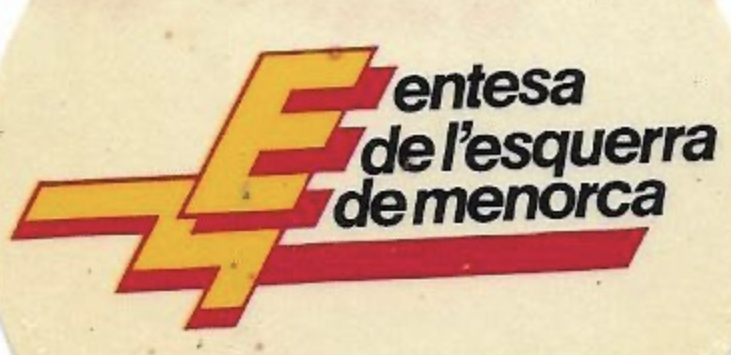
- Founded: 1987
- Dissolved: 1994
- Ideology: Socialism; Ecologism; Catalan nationalism
- Political position: Left-wing

The Entesa de l'Esquerra de Menorca (English: Agreement of the Left of Menorca, EEM) was an electoral alliance formed in Menorca by the Socialist Party of Menorca and Esquerra de Menorca, that lasted from 1987 to 1994.

== Member parties ==
- Socialist Party of Menorca (PSM)
- Left of Menorca (EM)

== Electoral performance ==
=== Parliament of the Balearic Islands ===
Date	Votes			Seats		Status	Size
Date	#	%	±pp	#	±	Status	Size
1987	4,367	1.3%	±0.0	2 / 59	0	Opposition	6th
1991	4,654	1.4%	+0.1	2 / 59	0	Opposition	4th
