= Progressive Union of Menorca =

Progressive Union of Menorca Unió Progressista de Menorca
- Founded: 26 March 1991
- Headquarters: Pl. Augusto Miranda, 25; 07702 Maó
- Ideology: Liberalism
- Political position: Centre-right

Progressive Union of Menorca (Catalan: Unió Progressista de Menorca, UPM) is a liberal centre-right political party in Es Mercadal municipality, Menorca, Spain. The president of the party is José Antonio Garriga.

== 1991 elections ==
In the 1991 municipal elections, the party obtained 120 votes (8.82%) and one seat in the municipal council.

== 1995 elections ==
In the 1995 municipal elections, the party obtained 161 votes (11.39%) and one seat in the municipal council.

== 1999 elections ==
In the 1999 municipal elections, the party obtained 193 votes (12.28%) and one seat in the municipal council.

== 2003 elections ==
In the 2003 municipal election, it contested the elections to the municipal council of Es Mercadal on a joint list with the Minorcan Party. The list got 163 votes (9.14%) and the party won one seat (held by Garriga) in the municipal council. UPM was the most voted party in Fornells. As of 2003, it forms part of the opposition in the municipal council.
