= Jeroni Albertí =

Spanish businessman and politician (1927–2024)

President of the Parliament of the Balearic Islands
- In office 3 July 1987 – 2 April 1991
- Preceded by: Antoni Cirerol Thomàs
- Succeeded by: Cristòfol Soler

President of the Island Council of Mallorca
- In office 23 June 1983 – 16 June 1987
- Preceded by: Maximilià Morales
- Succeeded by: Joan Verger
- In office 24 June 1979 – 27 September 1982
- Preceded by: Office established
- Succeeded by: Maximilià Morales

Member of the Senate of Spain for Mallorca
- In office 13 July 1977 – 31 August 1982

Personal details
- Born: Jeroni Albertí i Picornell; 26 October 1927 Banyalbufar, Spain
- Died: 21 February 2024 (aged 96) Palma de Mallorca, Spain
- Party: UM
- Education: University of Valencia
- Occupation: Businessman

Jeroni Albertí i Picornell (26 October 1927 – 21 February 2024) was a Spanish businessman and politician. He was the first president of the Inter-island General Council between 1977 and 1982, the pre-autonomous Balearic government.

As member of the Majorcan Union, he served in the Senate from 1977 to 1982 and was president of the Parliament of the Balearic Islands from 1987 to 1991.

Albertí died in Palma de Mallorca on 21 February 2024, at the age of 96.
