= Statute of Autonomy of the Balearic Islands =

The Statute of Autonomy of the Balearic Islands, approved by the Organic Law 2/1983 on February 25, established the Balearic Islands as an autonomous community of Spain. Since its initial approval, the statute has undergone many changes and reforms, the most recent of which came into effect on March 1, 2007, coinciding with the Day of Balearic Islands.
