= Socialist Party of Menorca =

Socialist Party of Menorca Partit Socialista de Menorca
- Secretary-General: Maite Salord; Nel Martí
- Founded: 4 April 1977
- Merger of: Socialist Movement of Menorca; Federalist Movement of Menorca
- Headquarters: C/Isidoro Antillón, 9, bajo, 07006 - Palma de Mallorca
- Youth wing: Joventuts d'Esquerra Nacionalista
- Membership (2014): 130
- Ideology: Democratic socialism Environmentalism; Catalan nationalism Catalanism; Catalan independentism
- Regional affiliation: More for Menorca (since 2014)
- European affiliation: European Free Alliance
- Local Government in Menorca: 14 / 114
- Parliament of the Balearic Islands: 1 / 59 Inside More for Menorca
- Council of Menorca: 3 / 13 Inside More for Menorca

Website
- psm-menorca.cat

The Socialist Party of Menorca (Catalan: Partit Socialista de Menorca, PSM MxM) is a democratic socialist, environmentalist and Catalan nationalist political party in the island of Menorca, Balearic Isles, Spain. It is the major party in the More for Menorca coalition.

== History ==
The party appeared as the merger of two socialist parties of Menorca, the Socialist Movement of Menorca and the Federalist Movement of Menorca, in 1977. In 1995 the youth wing of the party, Joventuts d'Esquerra Nacionalista was created.
