= Opinion polling for the 2015 Spanish local elections (Balearic Islands) =

In the run up to the 2015 Spanish local elections, various organisations carried out opinion polling to gauge voting intention in local entities in Spain. Results of such polls for municipalities and island councils in the Balearic Islands are displayed in this article. The date range for these opinion polls is from the previous local elections, held on 22 May 2011, to the day the next elections were held, on 24 May 2015.

Polls are listed in reverse chronological order, showing the most recent first and using the dates when the survey fieldwork was done, as opposed to the date of publication. Where the fieldwork dates are unknown, the date of publication is given instead. The highest percentage figure in each polling survey is displayed with its background shaded in the leading party's colour. If a tie ensues, this is applied to the figures with the highest percentages. The "Lead" columns on the right shows the percentage-point difference between the parties with the highest percentages in a given poll.

== Municipalities ==
=== Alaior ===
| Polling firm/Commissioner | Fieldwork date | Sample size | Turnout | PP | PSIB–PSOE | PSM | EM | El Pi | JxLô | Lead |
|---|---|---|---|---|---|---|---|---|---|---|
| 2015 municipal election | 24 May 2015 | —N/a | 64.8 | 48.1; 7 | (Note: Within Junts per Lô.) | | | 3.8; 0 | 46.2; 6 | 1.9 |
| Infortécnica/Diario Menorca (Note: Undecided and/or abstentionists excluded.) | 30 Apr–5 May 2015 | 272 | ? | 57.7; 7/9 | | | | 2.7; 0/2 | 39.7; 4/6 | 18.0 |
| 2011 municipal election | 22 May 2011 | —N/a | 68.8 | 52.9; 8 | 26.1; 3 | 9.4; 1 | 6.9; 1 | 2.4 (Note: Results for UMe.); 0 | – | 26.8 |

=== Calvià ===
| Polling firm/Commissioner | Fieldwork date | Sample size | Turnout | PP | PSIB–PSOE | TRxC | Més | Lliga | EUIB | CxI | UPyD | El Pi | SSPC | C's | EOC | Lead |
|---|---|---|---|---|---|---|---|---|---|---|---|---|---|---|---|---|
| 2015 municipal election | 24 May 2015 | —N/a | 53.8 | 33.5; 9 | 34.4; 10 | 1.1; 0 | (Note: Within Esquerra Oberta Calvià.) | (Note: Within El Pi.) | | | 1.0; 0 | 3.8; 0 | 10.1; 2 | 7.4; 2 | 7.2; 2 | 0.9 |
| Micaal TV | 1–20 Apr 2015 | 500 | ? | 39.0; 12 | 30.0; 9 | 3.0; 0 | | | | | 1.8; 0 | 3.6; 0 | 5.1; 1 | 6.0; 1 | 8.4; 2 | 9.0 |
| 2011 municipal election | 22 May 2011 | —N/a | 55.6 | 43.6; 14 | 33.6; 11 | 4.0; 0 | 3.7 (Note: Results for PSM–IV–ExM.); 0 | 3.1; 0 | 2.8; 0 | 2.4; 0 | 2.2; 0 | – | – | – | – | 10.0 |

=== Ciutadella de Menorca ===
| Polling firm/Commissioner | Fieldwork date | Sample size | Turnout | PP | PSIB–PSOE | PSM | UPCM | EM | Podemos/Podem | MpM | GxC | Lead |
|---|---|---|---|---|---|---|---|---|---|---|---|---|
| 2015 municipal election | 24 May 2015 | —N/a | 51.5 | 27.0; 6 | 16.1; 4 | (Note: Within MpM.) | 9.5; 2 | (Note: Within GxC.) | | 27.7; 6 | 12.8; 3 | 0.7 |
| Infortécnica/Diario Menorca | 30 Apr–5 May 2015 | 271 | ? | 47.7; 10/11 | 15.3; 3/4 | | 9.6; 1/3 | | | 21.1; 4/6 | – | 26.6 |
| Infortécnica/Diario Menorca | 8 Dec 2014 | 342 | ? | 40.8; 8/10 | 19.4; 5 | | 4.0; 0/1 | – | 15.6; 4 | 9.8; 2/3 | – | 21.4 |
| 2011 municipal election | 22 May 2011 | —N/a | 56.2 | 42.3; 10 | 19.9; 5 | 19.0; 4 | 8.9; 2 | 2.9; 2 | – | – | – | 22.4 |

=== Es Castell ===
| Polling firm/Commissioner | Fieldwork date | Sample size | Turnout | PP | PSIB–PSOE | El Pi | EM | PSM | Som | Lead |
|---|---|---|---|---|---|---|---|---|---|---|
| 2015 municipal election | 24 May 2015 | —N/a | 59.7 | 44.0; 6 | 21.4; 3 | 7.8; 1 | (Note: Within Som Es Castell.) | | 25.3; 3 | 18.3 |
| Infortécnica/Diario Menorca | 7–11 May 2015 | 185 | ? | 30.2; 4/5 | 46.6; 5/6 | 4.8; 0 | | | 18.5; 3 | 16.4 |
| 2011 municipal election | 22 May 2011 | —N/a | 59.5 | 42.9; 6 | 19.3; 3 | 12.9; 2 | 11.2; 1 | 6.7; 1 | – | 23.6 |

=== Es Mercadal ===
| Polling firm/Commissioner | Fieldwork date | Sample size | Turnout | PSIB–PSOE | PP | Entesa | UMe | Lead |
|---|---|---|---|---|---|---|---|---|
| 2015 municipal election | 24 May 2015 | —N/a | 55.9 | 45.9; 6 | 23.8; 3 | 27.8; 4 | – | 18.1 |
| Infortécnica | 4–8 May 2015 | 219 | ? | 57.1; 7 | 20.0; 3 | 22.9; 3 | – | 34.2 |
| 2011 municipal election | 22 May 2011 | —N/a | 57.0 | 39.3; 5 | 30.5; 4 | 20.3; 3 | 7.3; 1 | 8.8 |

=== Es Migjorn Gran ===
| Polling firm/Commissioner | Fieldwork date | Sample size | Turnout | PSIB–PSOE | PP | Lead |
|---|---|---|---|---|---|---|
| 2015 municipal election | 24 May 2015 | —N/a | 74.1 | 60.3; 6 | 34.6; 3 | 25.7 |
| Infortécnica/Diario Menorca | 7–11 May 2015 | 106 | ? | 78.2; 6 | 21.8; 3 | 56.4 |
| 2011 municipal election | 22 May 2011 | —N/a | 76.8 | 53.0; 5 | 42.6; 4 | 10.4 |

=== Ferreries ===
| Polling firm/Commissioner | Fieldwork date | Sample size | Turnout | PP | Entesa | PSIB–PSOE | El Pi | Lead |
|---|---|---|---|---|---|---|---|---|
| 2015 municipal election | 24 May 2015 | —N/a | 69.9 | 32.4; 4 | 48.0; 6 | 9.9; 1 | 7.2; 0 | 15.6 |
| Infortécnica/Diario Menorca | 11 May 2015 | ? | ? | 31.0; 4 | 46.0; 5 | 11.9; 1 | 10.9; 1 | 15.0 |
| 2011 municipal election | 22 May 2011 | —N/a | 70.3 | 36.6; 5 | 35.6; 4 | 13.0; 1 | 10.5; 1 | 1.0 |

=== Ibiza (town) ===
| Polling firm/Commissioner | Fieldwork date | Sample size | Turnout | PP | PSIB–PSOE | ExC | AL–in | UPyD | ENE | Podemos/Podem | G | EPIC | Lead |
|---|---|---|---|---|---|---|---|---|---|---|---|---|---|
| 2015 municipal election | 24 May 2015 | —N/a | 47.2 | 31.3; 8 | 28.8; 8 | (Note: Within Guanyem Eivissa.) | 1.5; 0 | 2.4; 0 | | | 16.4; 4 | 6.7; 1 | 2.5 |
| IBES/Última Hora | 10–18 Sep 2014 | 400 | ? | 33.0; 7/8 | 34.0; 8 | – | – | 5.0; 1 | – | 21.0; 4/5 | – | – | 1.0 |
| IBES/Última Hora | 11–14 Mar 2013 | 600 | ? | 40.0; 11 | 36.0; 9 | 4.0; 0 | 3.0; 0 | 6.0; 1 | 1.0; 0 | – | – | – | 4.0 |
| 2011 municipal election | 22 May 2011 | —N/a | 50.2 | 45.1; 11 | 32.7; 8 | 7.9; 1 | 5.1 (Note: Results for Nov–A.); 1 | 2.2; 0 | – | – | – | – | 12.4 |

=== Maó-Mahón ===
| Polling firm/Commissioner | Fieldwork date | Sample size | Turnout | PP | PSIB–PSOE | EM | PSM | CMe | EV | Podemos/Podem | Ara | El Pi | Lead |
|---|---|---|---|---|---|---|---|---|---|---|---|---|---|
| 2015 municipal election | 24 May 2015 | —N/a | 59.4 | 36.0; 8 | 25.6; 6 | (Note: Within Ara Maó.) | | 5.6; 1 | | | 27.6; 6 | 3.0; 0 | 8.4 |
| Infortécnica/Diario Menorca | 30 Apr–5 May 2015 | 272 | ? | 43.7; 9/11 | 31.8; 6/8 | | | 6.0; 0/2 | | | 16.8; 2/4 | 1.8; 0 | 11.9 |
| Infortécnica/Diario Menorca | 7 Dec 2014 | 344 | ? | 44.6; 10/11 | 37.1; 7/8 | – | – | – | – | 14.9; 3 | – | – | 7.5 |
| 2011 municipal election | 22 May 2011 | —N/a | 58.0 | 47.6; 13 | 30.9; 8 | 4.9; 0 | 3.3; 0 | 3.2; 0 | 2.7; 0 | – | – | – | 16.7 |

=== Palma de Mallorca ===
| Polling firm/Commissioner | Fieldwork date | Sample size | Turnout | PP | PSIB–PSOE | Més | Guanyem | UPyD | CxI | Lliga | C's | El Pi | SP | Lead |
|---|---|---|---|---|---|---|---|---|---|---|---|---|---|---|
| 2015 municipal election | 24 May 2015 | —N/a | 54.5 | 26.5; 9 | 19.0; 6 | 15.7; 5 | 4.0; 0 | 1.5; 0 | | | 11.7; 4 | 3.7; 0 | 14.8; 5 | 7.5 |
| IBES/Última Hora | 27 Apr–8 May 2015 | 400 | ? | 30.0– 32.0; 10/11 | 14.0– 16.0; 4/5 | 9.0– 11.0; 2/3 | 2.0– 5.0; 0/1 | – | | | 20.0– 22.0; 5/7 | 1.0– 3.0; 0 | 16.0– 18.0; 5/6 | 10.0 |
| RegioPlus Consulting | 22 Feb 2015 | 623 | ? | 28.0– 31.0; 11/12 | 20.0– 23.0; 7 | 12.0– 14.0; 4 | 3.0– 4.0; 0 | 3.0– 4.0; 0 | | | – | 1.0– 1.5; 0 | 18.0– 20.0; 5/6 | 8.0 |
| IBES/Última Hora | 26 Jan–6 Feb 2015 | 300 | ? | 33.0; 11/12 | 20.0; 6/7 | 7.0; 2/3 | 5.0; 0/1 | 4.0; 0 | | | 6.0; 1/2 | 3.0; 0 | 21.0; 7/8 | 12.0 |
| IBES/Última Hora | 1–12 Dec 2014 | 400 | ? | 35.0; 11/12 | 23.0; 7/8 | 10.0; 3 | 6.0; 1 | 5.0; 0/1 | | | – | 3.0; 0 | 15.0; 4/5 | 12.0 |
| IBES/Última Hora | 15–19 Sep 2014 | 600 | ? | 36.0; 13 | 18.0; 6 | 9.0; 3 | 5.0; 1 | 4.0; 0 | | | 2.0; 0 | 2.0; 0 | 19.0; 6 | 17.0 |
| IBES/Última Hora | 3–13 Jun 2014 | 900 | ? | 36.0; 12 | 20.0; 6 | 14.0; 4 | 6.0; 2 | 6.0; 2 | | | – | 1.0; 0 | 11.0; 3 | 16.0 |
| IBES/Última Hora | 1–15 Dec 2013 | 300 | ? | 38.0; 13 | 33.0; 11 | 11.0; 3 | 6.0; 2 | 4.0; 0 | | | – | 1.0; 0 | – | 5.0 |
| IBES/Última Hora | 11–14 Mar 2013 | 600 | ? | 39.0; 13 | 31.0; 10 | 10.0; 3 | 6.0; 2 | 5.0; 1 | | | – | 2.0; 0 | – | 8.0 |
| IBES/Última Hora | 1–14 Sep 2012 | 500 | ? | 41.0; 14 | 30.0; 10 | 9.0; 3 | 5.0; 1 | 5.0; 1 | 2.0; 0 | | – | – | – | 11.0 |
| IBES/Última Hora | 27 Feb–9 Mar 2012 | ? | ? | 45.0; 15 | 29.0; 10 | 8.0; 3 | 4.0; 0 | 5.0; 1 | 1.0; 0 | | – | – | – | 16.0 |
| 2011 municipal election | 22 May 2011 | —N/a | 54.4 | 48.2; 17 | 26.9; 9 | 8.3; 3 | 3.8 (Note: Results for EUIB.); 0 | 3.2; 0 | 1.5; 0 | 1.4; 0 | 0.4; 0 | – | – | 21.3 |

=== Sant Lluís ===
| Polling firm/Commissioner | Fieldwork date | Sample size | Turnout | PP | PSIB–PSOE | PSM | EM | El Pi | Volem | Lead |
|---|---|---|---|---|---|---|---|---|---|---|
| 2015 municipal election | 24 May 2015 | —N/a | 55.8 | 41.6; 6 | 17.9; 2 | (Note: Within Volem Sant Lluís.) | | 7.6; 1 | 30.0; 4 | 11.6 |
| Infortécnica/Diario Menorca | 4–11 May 2015 | 215 | ? | 61.9; 8 | 11.8; 2 | | | 4.6; 0 | 21.4; 3 | 40.5 |
| 2011 municipal election | 22 May 2011 | —N/a | 55.9 | 48.4; 7 | 26.7; 4 | 7.4; 1 | 7.3; 1 | 2.5; 0 | – | 21.7 |

== Island Councils ==
=== Formentera ===
| Polling firm/Commissioner | Fieldwork date | Sample size | Turnout | GxF | Sa Unió | PSIB–PSOE | PP | CF | Lead |
|---|---|---|---|---|---|---|---|---|---|
| 2015 island council election | 24 May 2015 | —N/a | 51.5 | 49.8; 9 | – | 13.9; 2 | 22.0; 4 | 12.6; 2 | 27.8 |
| Sigma Dos/El Mundo | 22–27 Apr 2015 | ? | ? | 48.0– 49.0; 9/10 | – | 13.0– 14.0; 1/2 | 28.0– 29.0; 5 | 3.0– 4.0; 1/2 | 20.0 |
| 2011 island council election | 22 May 2011 | —N/a | 60.9 | 44.0; 6 | 34.7; 5 | 15.3; 2 | (Note: Within Sa Unió.) | | 9.3 |

=== Ibiza (island) ===
| Polling firm/Commissioner | Fieldwork date | Sample size | Turnout | PP | PSIB–PSOE | ExC | UPyD | El Pi | Podemos/Podem | C's | Lead |
|---|---|---|---|---|---|---|---|---|---|---|---|
| 2015 island council election | 24 May 2015 | —N/a | 49.3 | 34.0; 6 | 23.8; 4 | – | 1.6; 0 | 4.6; 0 | 18.9; 3 | – | 10.2 |
| IBES/Última Hora | 27 Apr–8 May 2015 | 600 | ? | 31.0– 33.0; 4/6 | 30.0– 31.0; 4/5 | – | – | 3.0– 6.0; 0 | 21.0– 23.0; 3/4 | – | 1.0– 2.0 |
| Sigma Dos/El Mundo | 22–27 Apr 2015 | ? | ? | 39.0– 40.0; 5/6 | 32.0– 33.0; 4 | – | – | 2.0– 3.0; 0 | 18.0– 19.0; 2/3 | – | 7.0 |
| IBES/Última Hora | 26 Jan–6 Feb 2015 | 200 | ? | 37.0; 6 | 25.0; 4 | – | 3.0; 0 | – | 20.0; 3 | 5.0; 0 | 12.0 |
| IBES/Última Hora | 10–18 Sep 2014 | 300 | ? | 40.0; 6 | 21.0; 3 | 4.0; 0 | 5.0; 0/1 | – | 23.0; 3/4 | – | 17.0 |
| IBES/Última Hora | 3–13 Jun 2014 | ? | ? | 40.0; 6 | 26.0; 4 | – | 7.0; 1 | – | 14.0; 2 | – | 14.0 |
| 2014 EP election | 25 May 2014 | —N/a | 30.4 | 30.1; 5 | 25.2; 4 | 8.1; 1 | 6.1; 1 | – | 10.6; 2 | 2.5; 0 | 4.9 |
| IBES/Última Hora | Mar 2014 | ? | ? | 41.0 | 31.0 | – | 8.0 | – | – | – | 10.0 |
| IBES/Última Hora | 3–14 Jun 2013 | ? | ? | 44.0; 7 | 32.0; 5 | 4.0; 0 | 7.0; 1 | – | – | – | 12.0 |
| IBES/Última Hora | 3–10 Dec 2012 | ? | ? | 42.0; 7 | 31.0; 5 | 4.0; 0 | 7.0; 1 | – | – | – | 11.0 |
| IBES/Última Hora | 28–31 May 2012 | ? | ? | 46.0 | 30.0 | 4.0 | 6.0 | – | – | – | 16.0 |
| IBES/Última Hora | 1–15 Feb 2012 | ? | ? | 47.0 | 32.0 | 5.0 | 5.0 | – | – | – | 15.0 |
| 2011 general election | 20 Nov 2011 | —N/a | 57.2 | 48.9; 8 | 34.7; 5 | 5.2; 0 | 4.4; 0 | – | – | – | 14.2 |
| IBES/Última Hora | 6–13 Sep 2011 | ? | ? | 49.0 | 33.0 | 4.0 | 4.0 | – | – | – | 16.0 |
| 2011 island council election | 22 May 2011 | —N/a | 52.1 | 51.4; 8 | 29.8; 5 | 5.9; 0 | 2.1; 0 | – | – | – | 21.6 |

=== Mallorca ===
| Polling firm/Commissioner | Fieldwork date | Sample size | Turnout | PP | PSIB–PSOE | Més | Lliga | CxI | Guanyem | UPyD | esquerra | C's | El Pi | Podemos/Podem | Lead |
|---|---|---|---|---|---|---|---|---|---|---|---|---|---|---|---|
| 2015 island council election | 24 May 2015 | —N/a | 60.2 | 27.8; 10 | 17.9; 7 | 17.3; 6 | | | 1.8; 0 | 0.9; 0 | – | 7.3; 2 | 9.4; 3 | 14.3; 5 | 9.9 |
| IBES/Última Hora | 27 Apr–8 May 2015 | 600 | ? | 32.0– 33.0; 11/12 | 18.0– 19.0; 6/7 | 8.0– 9.0; 2/3 | | | 3.0– 5.0; 0/1 | 1.0– 2.0; 0 | – | 15.0– 17.0; 5/6 | 4.0– 6.0; 0/2 | 13.0– 15.0; 5/6 | 14.0 |
| Sigma Dos/El Mundo | 22–27 Apr 2015 | ? | ? | 32.0– 33.0; 12 | 16.0– 17.0; 6 | 12.0– 13.0; 4/5 | | | 6.0– 7.0; 2 | – | – | 11.0– 12.0; 4 | 2.0– 3.0; 0 | 12.0– 13.0; 4/5 | 16.0 |
| IBES/Última Hora | 26 Jan–6 Feb 2015 | 200 | ? | 34.0; 13/14 | 19.0; 7/8 | 8.0; 2/3 | | | 3.0; 0 | 2.0; 0 | – | 5.0; 0/1 | 6.0; 1/3 | 21.0; 7/8 | 13.0 |
| IBES/Última Hora | 10–18 Sep 2014 | 300 | ? | 38.0; 15 | 20.0; 8 | 10.0; 4 | | | 3.0; 0 | 4.0; 0/1 | (Note: Within Més.) | 2.0; 0 | 5.0; 1 | 15.0; 4/5 | 18.0 |
| IBES/Última Hora | 3–13 Jun 2014 | ? | ? | 38.0; 15 | 21.0; 8 | 13.0; 5 | | | 6.0; 1/2 | 6.0; 1 | – | 4.0; 0/1 | 1.0; 0 | 8.0; 2 | 17.0 |
| 2014 EP election | 25 May 2014 | —N/a | 37.5 | 27.2; 11 | 21.4; 9 | – | – | – | 8.6; 3 | 6.9; 3 | 7.8; 3 | 2.3; 0 | – | 10.5; 4 | 5.8 |
| IBES/Última Hora | 3–14 Jun 2013 | ? | ? | 40.0; 15/16 | 26.0; 10 | 12.0; 4 | | | 6.0; 1/2 | 5.0; 1 | 1.0; 0 | – | 5.0; 1 | – | 14.0 |
| IBES/Última Hora | 3–10 Dec 2012 | ? | ? | 40.0; 15 | 23.0; 9 | 13.0; 5 | | | 5.0; 1 | 5.0; 1 | 2.0; 0 | – | 7.0; 2 | – | 17.0 |
| IBES/Última Hora | 28–31 May 2012 | ? | ? | 42.0 | 23.0 | 11.0 | 5.0 | | 4.0 | – | – | – | – | – | 19.0 |
| IBES/Última Hora | 1–15 Feb 2012 | ? | ? | 45.0 | 21.0 | 12.0 | 4.0 | | 5.0 | – | – | – | – | – | 24.0 |
| 2011 general election | 20 Nov 2011 | —N/a | 63.1 | 49.9; 19 | 27.8; 11 | 8.0; 3 | – | – | 4.7; 0 | 4.4; 0 | 1.1; 0 | – | – | – | 22.1 |
| IBES/Última Hora | 6–13 Sep 2011 | ? | ? | 48.0 | 20.0 | 12.0 | 2.0 | | 6.0 | – | – | – | – | – | 28.0 |
| 2011 island council election | 22 May 2011 | —N/a | 61.0 | 46.1; 19 | 23.6; 10 | 10.6; 4 | 3.9; 0 | 3.6; 0 | 2.9; 0 | 2.2; 0 | 1.6; 0 | 0.3; 0 | – | – | 22.5 |

=== Menorca ===
| Polling firm/Commissioner | Fieldwork date | Sample size | Turnout | PP | PSIB–PSOE | PSM | EM | El Pi | CenB | EV | CMe | UPyD | esquerra | Podemos/Podem | MpM | Lead |
|---|---|---|---|---|---|---|---|---|---|---|---|---|---|---|---|---|
| 2015 island council election | 22 May 2011 | —N/a | 58.4 | 31.8; 5 | 22.5; 3 | | 4.2; 0 | 3.0; 0 | – | | 5.0; 0 | – | | 12.5; 2 | 18.7; 3 | 9.3 |
| Infortécnica/Diario Menorca | 24 Apr–11 May 2015 | 714 | ? | 43.9; 6/7 | 26.9; 3/4 | | 7.0; 1 | 3.1; 0 | – | | 3.3; 0 | – | | 6.1; 1 | 9.4; 1 | 17.0 |
| Sigma Dos/El Mundo | 22–27 Apr 2015 | ? | ? | 33.0– 34.0; 5/6 | 26.0– 27.0; 4 | | 3.0– 4.0; 0 | 4.0– 5.0; 0 | – | | – | – | | 17.0– 18.0; 2/3 | 10.0– 11.0; 1 | 7.0 |
| IBES/Última Hora | 26 Jan–6 Feb 2015 | 200 | ? | 34.0; 6 | 23.0; 3/4 | | 6.0; 0/1 | 3.0; 0 | – | | 2.0; 0 | 3.0; 0 | | 14.0; 1/2 | 13.0; 1/2 | 11.0 |
| Infortécnica/Diario Menorca | 14 Dec 2014 | 552 | ? | 43.7; 7/8 | 15.4; 2/3 | | 8.0; 0/1 | – | – | | – | – | | 8.7; 0/1 | 10.9; 1/2 | 28.3 |
| IBES/Última Hora | 10–18 Sep 2014 | 300 | ? | 36.0; 6 | 26.0; 4 | | 6.0; 0/1 | 4.0; 0 | – | | – | 3.0; 0 | | 11.0; 1/2 | 9.0; 1 | 10.0 |
| IBES/Última Hora | 3–13 Jun 2014 | ? | ? | 36.0; 6 | 29.0; 3 | 9.0; 1 | 7.0; 1 | – | – | – | – | ? 1 | – | 8.0; 1 | – | 7.0 |
| 2014 EP election | 25 May 2014 | —N/a | 36.4 | 27.1; 4 | 23.5; 4 | – | 11.8; 2 | – | – | (Note: Within EM.) | 2.3; 0 | 5.7; 1 | 7.2; 1 | 8.4; 1 | – | 3.6 |
| IBES/Última Hora | Mar 2014 | ? | ? | 40.0 | 31.0 | 10.0 | 9.0 | – | – | – | – | – | – | – | – | 9.0 |
| IBES/Última Hora | 3–14 Jun 2013 | ? | ? | 43.0; 6 | 32.0; 5 | 7.0; 1 | 8.0; 1 | – | – | – | – | 1.0; 0 | – | – | – | 11.0 |
| IBES/Última Hora | 3–10 Dec 2012 | ? | ? | 44.0; 7 | 26.0; 4 | 8.0; 1 | 7.0; 1 | 3.0; 0 | 3.0; 0 | 2.0; 0 | – | 2.0; 0 | – | – | – | 18.0 |
| IBES/Última Hora | 28–31 May 2012 | ? | ? | 44.0 | 27.0 | 9.0 | 6.0 | – | – | – | – | – | – | – | – | 17.0 |
| IBES/Última Hora | 1–15 Feb 2012 | ? | ? | 45.0 | 26.0 | 9.0 | 5.0 | – | – | – | – | 2.0 | – | – | – | 19.0 |
| 2011 general election | 20 Nov 2011 | —N/a | 61.2 | 47.5; 7 | 30.7; 4 | 6.3; 1 | 6.8; 1 | – | – | – | – | 2.6; 0 | 1.0; 0 | – | – | 16.8 |
| IBES/Última Hora | 6–13 Sep 2011 | ? | ? | 46.0 | 24.0 | 10.0 | 4.0 | – | – | – | – | 2.0 | – | – | – | 22.0 |
| 2011 island council election | 22 May 2011 | —N/a | 60.2 | 46.8; 8 | 25.7; 4 | 11.2; 1 | 4.2; 0 | 2.8; 0 | 2.2; 0 | 1.8; 0 | 1.2 (Note: Results for UPCM.); 0 | 1.0; 0 | – | – | – | 21.1 |

== See also ==
- 2015 Balearic island council elections
- 2015 Spanish local elections in the Balearic Islands
