= Opinion polling for the 2011 Spanish local elections (Balearic Islands) =

In the run up to the 2011 Spanish local elections, various organisations carried out opinion polling to gauge voting intention in local entities in Spain. Results of such polls for municipalities and island councils in the Balearic Islands are displayed in this article. The date range for these opinion polls is from the previous local elections, held on 27 May 2007, to the day the next elections were held, on 22 May 2011.

Polls are listed in reverse chronological order, showing the most recent first and using the dates when the survey fieldwork was done, as opposed to the date of publication. Where the fieldwork dates are unknown, the date of publication is given instead. The highest percentage figure in each polling survey is displayed with its background shaded in the leading party's colour. If a tie ensues, this is applied to the figures with the highest percentages. The "Lead" columns on the right shows the percentage-point difference between the parties with the highest percentages in a given poll.

== Municipalities ==
=== Alaior ===
Polling firm/Commissioner	Fieldwork date	Sample size	Turnout	PP	PSIB–PSOE	EM	PSM	Lead
2011 municipal election	22 May 2011	—N/a	68.8	52.9; 8	26.1; 3	6.9; 1	9.4; 1	26.8
Infortécnica	May 2011	130	?	? 6/7	? 4/5	? 0/2	? 1/3	?
2007 municipal election	27 May 2007	—N/a	70.0	45.6; 6	39.3; 6	10.2; 1	–	6.3

=== Ciutadella de Menorca ===
Polling firm/Commissioner	Fieldwork date	Sample size	Turnout	PP	PSIB–PSOE	PSM	UPCM	Lead
2011 municipal election	22 May 2011	—N/a	56.2	42.3; 10	19.9; 5	19.0; 4	8.9; 2	22.4
Infortécnica/Menorca	May 2010	210	?	? 8/10	? 5/6	? 4/5	? 1/2	?
2007 municipal election	27 May 2007	—N/a	58.5	39.5; 10	26.6; 6	15.2; 4	5.2; 1	12.9

=== Es Castell ===
Polling firm/Commissioner	Fieldwork date	Sample size	Turnout	PP	PSIB–PSOE	UMe	PSM	EM	Lead
2011 municipal election	22 May 2011	—N/a	59.5	42.9; 6	19.3; 3	12.9; 2	6.7; 1	11.2; 1	23.6
Infortécnica	May 2011	130	?	? 4/6	? 3/5	? 0/2	? 0/2	? 0/2	?
2007 municipal election	27 May 2007	—N/a	60.0	27.0; 4	26.7; 4	26.1 (Note: Results for IPEC.); 3	11.1; 1	6.9; 1	0.3

=== Es Mercadal ===
Polling firm/Commissioner	Fieldwork date	Sample size	Turnout	Entesa	PSIB–PSOE	PP	UCN	UMe	Lead
2011 municipal election	22 May 2011	—N/a	57.0	20.3; 3	39.3; 5	30.5; 4	–	7.3; 1	8.8
Infortécnica	May 2011	110	?	? 1/3	? 5/7	? 4/5	–	? 0	?
2007 municipal election	27 May 2007	—N/a	63.8	31.0; 4	24.3; 3	20.3; 2	15.0; 1	7.6 (Note: Results for GS–UCM.); 1	6.7

=== Es Migjorn Gran ===
Polling firm/Commissioner	Fieldwork date	Sample size	Turnout	PP	PSIB–PSOE	APMG	Lead
2011 municipal election	22 May 2011	—N/a	76.8	42.6; 4	53.0; 5	–	10.4
Infortécnica	May 2011	80	?	? 3/5	? 4/6	–	?
2007 municipal election	27 May 2007	—N/a	80.9	43.4; 4	41.9; 4	13.1; 1	1.5

=== Ferreries ===
Polling firm/Commissioner	Fieldwork date	Sample size	Turnout	Entesa	PP	PSIB–PSOE	UMe	Lead
2011 municipal election	22 May 2011	—N/a	70.3	35.6; 4	36.6; 5	13.0; 1	10.5; 1	1.0
Infortécnica	May 2011	110	?	? 3/5	? 4/6	? 0/2	? 0/2	?
2007 municipal election	27 May 2007	—N/a	70.4	38.8; 5	25.7; 3	18.5; 2	13.7 (Note: Results for UCM.); 2	13.1

=== Inca ===
Polling firm/Commissioner	Fieldwork date	Sample size	Turnout	PP	PSIB–PSOE	Bloc	INDI	UM	PSM	Lead
2011 municipal election	22 May 2011	—N/a	62.5	42.5; 11	24.1; 6	–	11.2; 2	–	9.5; 2	18.4
IBES/PP	20–29 Oct 2010	572	?	51.1; 12	22.6; 5	9.9; 2	9.7; 2	0.6; 0	(Note: Within Bloc.)	28.5
2007 municipal election	27 May 2007	—N/a	63.0	51.7; 12	25.0; 6	10.1; 2	7.4; 1	4.5; 1		26.7

=== Maó-Mahón ===
Polling firm/Commissioner	Fieldwork date	Sample size	Turnout	PSIB–PSOE	PP	PSM	EM	CMe	Lead
2011 municipal election	22 May 2011	—N/a	58.0	30.9; 8	47.6; 13	3.3; 0	4.9; 0	3.2; 0	16.7
Infortécnica/Menorca	May 2010	210	?	? 6/8	? 12/14	? 0/2	? 0	? 0	?
2007 municipal election	27 May 2007	—N/a	56.5	38.2; 9	37.8; 8	8.9; 2	6.5; 1	6.4; 1	0.4

=== Marratxí ===
Polling firm/Commissioner	Fieldwork date	Sample size	Turnout	PP	PSIB–PSOE	IdMa	PSM	Lead
2011 municipal election	22 May 2011	—N/a	63.9	48.2; 13	17.5; 4	10.6; 2	10.6; 2	30.7
Infortécnica	Mar 2009	457	?	? 12	? 7	? 1/2	? 0/1	?
2007 municipal election	27 May 2007	—N/a	61.2	45.9; 11	29.1; 7	7.8; 2	5.5; 1	16.8

=== Palma ===
Polling firm/Commissioner	Fieldwork date	Sample size	Turnout	PP	PSIB–PSOE	Bloc	UM	PSM	UPyD	EUIB	CxI	Lliga	esquerra	Lead
2011 municipal election	22 May 2011	—N/a	54.4	48.2; 17	26.9; 9	–	–	8.3; 3	3.2; 0	3.8; 0	1.5; 0	1.4; 0	1.1; 0	21.3
Gadeso	Apr 2011	400	58.0	43.0– 44.0; 15	35.0– 36.0; 12	–	–	6.0– 7.0; 2	1.0– 2.0; 0	3.0– 4.0; 0	3.5– 4.5; 0	3.0– 4.0; 0	0.5– 1.5; 0	7.0– 9.0
Gadeso	Apr 2011	400	68.0	42.0– 43.0; 15	36.0– 37.0; 12	–	–	7.0– 8.0; 2	1.0– 2.0; 0	3.0– 4.0; 0	3.5– 4.5; 0	3.0– 4.0; 0	0.5– 1.5; 0	5.0– 7.0
IBES/Última Hora	21–30 Mar 2011	400	?	48.0; 15/16	35.0; 12	–	–	5.0; 1	2.0; 0	4.0; 0/1	2.0; 0	–	–	13.0
IBES/Última Hora	Feb 2011	?	?	47.0; 15	37.0; 12	–	2.0; 0	6.0; 2	3.0; 0	2.0; 0	–	–	–	10.0
IBES/Última Hora	Dec 2010	?	?	46.0; 15	38.0; 13	–	2.0; 0	5.0; 1	3.0; 0	2.0; 0	–	–	–	8.0
IBES/Última Hora	Sep 2010	?	?	45.0; 15	38.0; 12	–	4.0; 0	6.0; 2	2.0; 0	2.0; 0	–	–	–	7.0
IBES/Última Hora	May 2010	?	?	44.0; 14	36.0; 12	–	5.0; 1	9.0; 2	1.0; 0	–	–	–	–	8.0
2007 municipal election	27 May 2007	—N/a	53.2	46.1; 14	35.4; 11	8.2; 2	6.6; 2		–		–	–		15.6

=== Sant Lluís ===
Polling firm/Commissioner	Fieldwork date	Sample size	Turnout	PSIB–PSOE	PP	PSM	EM	Lead
2011 municipal election	22 May 2011	—N/a	55.9	26.7; 4	48.4; 7	7.4; 1	7.3; 1	21.7
Infortécnica	May 2011	120	?	? 2/4	? 7/9	? 0/2	? 0/2	?
2007 municipal election	27 May 2007	—N/a	57.1	36.8; 5	33.5; 5	19.9; 2	7.1; 1	3.3

== Island Councils ==
=== Formentera ===
Polling firm/Commissioner	Fieldwork date	Sample size	Turnout	GxF	PP	PSIB–PSOE	GUIF	Sa Unió	PREF	Lead
2011 island council election	22 May 2011	—N/a	60.9	44.0; 6	(Note: Within Sa Unió.)	15.3; 2		34.7; 5	4.0; 0	9.3
IBES/Última Hora	26 Apr–7 May 2011	200	?	34.0; 5		18.0; 2		42.0; 6	<1.0; 0	8.0
IBES/Última Hora	21–30 Mar 2011	200	?	34.0; 5		20.0; 2		42.0; 6	<4.0; 0	8.0
IBES/Última Hora	12 Feb 2011	?	?	36.0; 5		20.0; 2		41.0; 6	–	5.0
IBES/Última Hora	18 Dec 2010	?	?	37.0; 5		20.0; 2		40.0; 6	–	3.0
IBES/Última Hora	Sep 2010	?	?	38.0; 5		19.0; 2		40.0; 6	–	2.0
2009 EP election	7 Jun 2009	—N/a	29.8	–	37.5; 6	46.2; 7	–	–	–	8.7
2007 island council election	27 May 2007	—N/a	62.3	32.8; 5	30.9; 4	19.6; 2	15.0; 2	–	–	1.9

=== Ibiza ===
Polling firm/Commissioner	Fieldwork date	Sample size	Turnout	PSOE–ExC	PP	PSIB–PSOE	ExC	Lead
2011 island council election	22 May 2011	—N/a	52.1	–	51.4; 8	29.8; 5	5.9; 0	21.6
IBES/Última Hora	26 Apr–7 May 2011	400	?	–	49.0; 7	37.0; 6	3.0; 0	12.0
IBES/Última Hora	21–30 Mar 2011	400	?	–	50.0; 6/7	39.0; 6	5.0; 0	11.0
IBES/Última Hora	12 Feb 2011	?	?	–	47.0; 7	41.0; 6	3.0; 0	6.0
IBES/Última Hora	18 Dec 2010	?	?	–	46.0; 7	41.0; 6	4.0; 0	5.0
IBES/Última Hora	Sep 2010	?	?	–	45.0; 7	43.0; 6	5.0; 0	2.0
Infortécnica	Jan 2010	442	?	–	50.4	24.4	17.2	26.0
2009 EP election	7 Jun 2009	—N/a	34.2	–	47.8; 7	41.2; 6	2.5; 0	6.6
2007 island council election	27 May 2007	—N/a	54.5	46.8; 7	46.7; 6	(Note: Within PSOE–ExC.)		0.1

=== Mallorca ===
Polling firm/Commissioner	Fieldwork date	Sample size	Turnout	PP	PSIB–PSOE	Bloc	UM	esquerra	UPyD	EUIB	PSM	CxI	Lliga	Lead
2011 island council election	22 May 2011	—N/a	61.0	46.1; 19	23.6; 10	–	–	1.6; 0	2.2; 0	2.9; 0	10.6; 4	3.6; 0	3.9; 0	22.5
IBES/Última Hora	26 Apr–7 May 2011	800	?	47.0; 17/18	32.0; 11/12	–	–	–	3.0; 0/1	3.0; 0/1	7.0; 2/3	3.0; 0/1	3.0; 0/1	15.0
Gadeso	Apr 2011	400	?	39.0– 40.0; 17/19	25.0– 26.0; 12	–	–	0.5– 1.5; 0	1.0– 2.0; 0	2.0– 3.0; 0	5.5– 6.5; 2/3	3.0– 4.0; 0/1	2.5– 3.5; 0	14.0
IBES/Última Hora	21–30 Mar 2011	800	?	47.0; 17	32.0; 12	–	–	–	2.0; 0	3.0; 0	8.0; 3	5.0; 1	3.0; 0	15.0
IBES/Última Hora	12 Feb 2011	?	?	48.0; 18	33.0; 12	–	5.0; 1	–	1.0; 0	2.0; 0	8.0; 2	–	–	15.0
IBES/Última Hora	18 Dec 2010	?	?	46.0; 17	34.0; 12	–	7.0; 2	–	2.0; 0	2.0; 0	8.0; 2	–	–	12.0
IBES/Última Hora	Sep 2010	?	?	45.0; 17	35.0; 13	–	5.0; 1	–	3.0; 0	1.0; 0	9.0; 3	–	–	10.0
2009 EP election	7 Jun 2009	—N/a	36.5	43.6; 18	37.9; 15	–	4.4; 0	3.2; 0	2.9; 0	2.5; 0	–	–	–	5.7
2007 island council election	27 May 2007	—N/a	61.0	45.8; 16	30.2; 11	10.5; 3	9.9; 3		–			–	–	15.6

=== Menorca ===
Polling firm/Commissioner	Fieldwork date	Sample size	Turnout	PP	PSIB–PSOE	PSM	EM	Lead
2011 island council election	22 May 2011	—N/a	60.2	46.8; 8	25.7; 4	11.2; 1	4.2; 0	21.1
Infortécnica/Menorca	16 May 2011	?	?	? 7	? 5	? 1	–	?
IBES/Última Hora	26 Apr–7 May 2011	400	?	46.0; 7	36.0; 5	7.0; 1	–	10.0
IBES/Última Hora	21–30 Mar 2011	400	?	43.0; 6/7	40.0; 6	7.0; 0/1	3.0; 0	3.0
IBES/Última Hora	12 Feb 2011	?	?	45.0; 7	40.0; 6	6.0; 0	2.0; 0	5.0
IBES/Última Hora	18 Dec 2010	?	?	44.0; 6	38.0; 6	8.0; 1	3.0; 0	6.0
IBES/Última Hora	Sep 2010	?	?	44.0; 6	37.0; 6	9.0; 1	–	7.0
2009 EP election	7 Jun 2009	—N/a	34.5	41.8; 7	40.3; 6	–	4.0; 0	1.5
2007 island council election	27 May 2007	—N/a	58.7	40.9; 6	40.6; 6	9.1; 1	4.4; 0	0.3

== See also ==
- 2011 Balearic island council elections
- 2011 Spanish local elections in the Balearic Islands
