= 2011 Balearic island council elections =

Elections in the Spanish region of the Balearic Islands

Island council elections were held in the Balearic Islands on 22 May 2011 to elect the 9th Consells Insulars of Mallorca and Menorca and the 2nd Consells Insulars of Formentera and Ibiza. All 72 seats in the four island councils were up for election. They were held concurrently with regional elections in thirteen autonomous communities and local elections all across Spain.

== Island control ==
The following table lists party control in the island councils. Gains for a party are highlighted in that party's colour.

Island	Population	Previous control	New control
Formentera	9,962	People for Formentera (GxF)	People for Formentera (GxF)
Ibiza	132,637	Socialist Party of the Balearic Islands (PSIB–PSOE)	People's Party (PP)
Mallorca	869,067	Socialist Party of the Balearic Islands (PSIB–PSOE)	People's Party (PP)
Menorca	94,383	Socialist Party of the Balearic Islands (PSIB–PSOE)	People's Party (PP)

== Islands ==
=== Formentera ===
← Summary of the 22 May 2011 Island Council of Formentera election results →
Parties and alliances	Popular vote			Seats	
Parties and alliances	Votes	%	±pp	Total	+/−
People for Formentera (GxF)	1,662	44.04	+11.26	6	+1
The Union of Formentera (PP–GUIF) (Sa Unió)^{1}	1,308	34.66	−11.20	5	−1
Socialist Party of the Balearic Islands (PSIB–PSOE)	577	15.29	−4.34	2	±0
Renewal Party of Ibiza and Formentera (PREF)	152	4.03	New	0	±0
Blank ballots	75	1.99	+0.26		
Total	3,774			13	±0
Valid votes	3,774	98.20	−0.71		
Invalid votes	69	1.80	+0.71		
Votes cast / turnout	3,843	60.86	−1.45		
Abstentions	2,471	39.14	+1.45		
Registered voters	6,314				
Sources
Footnotes: ^{1} The Union of Formentera results are compared to the combined totals of People's Party and Independents of Formentera Group in the 2007 election.

=== Ibiza ===
← Summary of the 22 May 2011 Island Council of Ibiza election results →
Parties and alliances	Popular vote			Seats	
Parties and alliances	Votes	%	±pp	Total	+/−
People's Party (PP)	21,368	51.38	+4.69	8	+2
PSOE–Pact for Ibiza (PSOE–PxE)^{1}	12,383	29.77	n/a	5	+1
Ibiza for Change (ExC)^{1}	2,466	5.93	n/a	0	−3
New Alternative (Nov–A)	1,650	3.97	New	0	±0
Sustainable Ibiza (ESOS)	910	2.19	New	0	±0
Union, Progress and Democracy (UPyD)	872	2.10	New	0	±0
Nationalist and Ecologist Agreement (ENE)^{1}	541	1.30	n/a	0	±0
Blank ballots	1,041	3.32	+0.92		
Total	41,591			13	±0
Valid votes	41,591	98.42	−0.83		
Invalid votes	669	1.58	+0.83		
Votes cast / turnout	42,260	52.15	−2.32		
Abstentions	38,778	47.85	+2.32		
Registered voters	81,038				
Sources
Footnotes: ^{1} Within the PSOE–Ibiza for Change alliance in the 2007 election.

=== Mallorca ===
← Summary of the 22 May 2011 Island Council of Mallorca election results →
Parties and alliances	Popular vote			Seats	
Parties and alliances	Votes	%	±pp	Total	+/−
People's Party (PP)	154,964	46.08	+0.29	19	+3
Socialist Party of the Balearic Islands (PSIB–PSOE)	79,235	23.56	−6.60	10	−1
PSM–Initiative Greens–Agreement (PSM–IV–ExM)^{1}	35,554	10.57	n/a	4	+2
Regionalist League of the Balearic Islands (IB–Lliga)	13,280	3.95	New	0	±0
Convergence for the Isles (CxI)^{2}	12,015	3.57	−6.34	0	−3
United Left of the Balearic Islands (EUIB)^{1}	9,864	2.93	n/a	0	−1
Union, Progress and Democracy (UPyD)	7,380	2.19	New	0	±0
Republican Left (esquerra)^{1}	5,317	1.58	n/a	0	±0
Citizens for Blank Votes (CenB)	2,314	0.69	+0.44	0	±0
Anti-Bullfighting Party Against Mistreatment of Animals (PACMA)	1,298	0.39	New	0	±0
Independent Social Group (ASI)	1,067	0.32	−0.29	0	±0
Citizens–Party of the Citizenry (C's)	845	0.25	New	0	±0
Citizens of Democratic Centre (CCD)	625	0.19	New	0	±0
Dissidents (Dissidents)	595	0.18	New	0	±0
Workers for Democracy Coalition (TD)	575	0.17	−0.08	0	±0
Spanish Liberal Project (PLIE)	565	0.17	New	0	±0
Family and Life Party (PFyV)	519	0.15	New	0	±0
Islander Party of the Balearic Islands (PIIB)	296	0.09	−0.02	0	±0
Radical Balearic Party (PRB)	230	0.07	New	0	±0
Blank ballots	9,762	2.86	+1.03		
Total	336,300			33	±0
Valid votes	336,300	98.40	−1.03		
Invalid votes	5,470	1.60	+1.03		
Votes cast / turnout	341,770	60.97	−0.05		
Abstentions	218,739	39.03	+0.05		
Registered voters	560,509				
Sources
Footnotes: ^{1} Within the Bloc for Mallorca alliance in the 2007 election.; ^{2} Convergence for the Isles results are compared to Majorcan Union totals in the 2007 election.; }

=== Menorca ===
← Summary of the 22 May 2011 Island Council of Menorca election results →
Parties and alliances	Popular vote			Seats	
Parties and alliances	Votes	%	±pp	Total	+/−
People's Party (PP)	17,781	46.82	+5.90	8	+2
Socialist Party of the Balearic Islands (PSIB–PSOE)	9,762	25.71	−14.86	4	−2
Socialist Party of Menorca–Nationalist Agreement (PSM–EN)^{1}	4,237	11.16	n/a	1	±0
Left of Menorca–United Left (EM–EU)	1,598	4.21	−0.19	0	±0
Menorcan Union (UMe)^{2}	1,067	2.81	+0.78	0	±0
Citizens for Blank Votes (CenB)	840	2.21	+1.44	0	±0
The Greens of Menorca (EV–Me)^{1}	683	1.80	n/a	0	±0
Ciutadella de Menorca People's Union (UPCM)	467	1.23	New	0	±0
Union, Progress and Democracy (UPyD)	392	1.03	New	0	±0
Blank ballots	1,148	2.97	+1.03		
Total	37,975			13	±0
Valid votes	37,975	98.36	−0.95		
Invalid votes	632	1.64	+0.95		
Votes cast / turnout	38,607	60.19	+1.49		
Abstentions	25,532	39.81	−1.49		
Registered voters	64,139				
Sources
Footnotes: ^{1} Within the PSM–Nationalist Agreement–The Greens of Menorca alliance in the 2011 election.; ^{2} Menorcan Union results are compared to Union of Centrists of Menorca totals in the 2007 election.

== See also ==
- 2011 Balearic regional election
