= 2015 Spanish local elections in the Balearic Islands =

This article presents the results breakdown of the local elections held in the Balearic Islands on 24 May 2015. The following tables show detailed results in the autonomous community's most populous municipalities, sorted alphabetically.

== City control ==
The following table lists party control in the most populous municipalities, including provincial capitals (shown in bold). Gains for a party are displayed with the cell's background shaded in that party's colour.

Municipality	Population	Previous control	New control
Calvià	50,363	People's Party (PP)	Socialist Party of the Balearic Islands (PSIB–PSOE)
Ciutadella de Menorca	29,282	People's Party (PP)	Socialist Party of Menorca–More for Menorca (PSM–MpM)
Ibiza	49,693	People's Party (PP)	Socialist Party of the Balearic Islands (PSIB–PSOE)
Inca	30,625	People's Party (PP)	Socialist Party of the Balearic Islands (PSIB–PSOE)
Llucmajor	34,602	People's Party (PP)	More for Mallorca–APIB (Més–APIB) (El Pi in 2016; PSIB–PSOE in 2018)
Manacor	40,264	Coalition for Manacor (CpM)	More for Mallorca–Republican Left (Més–esquerra–APIB) (PP in 2015; El Pi in 2017)
Maó-Mahón	28,460	People's Party (PP)	Now Maó (Ara Maó)
Marratxí	35,521	People's Party (PP)	More for Mallorca–APIB (Més–APIB)
**Palma de Mallorca**	399,093	People's Party (PP)	Socialist Party of the Balearic Islands (PSIB–PSOE) (Més in 2017)
Sant Antoni de Portmany	23,359	People's Party (PP)	Socialist Party of the Balearic Islands (PSIB–PSOE)
Sant Josep de sa Talaia	25,362	People's Party (PP)	Socialist Party of the Balearic Islands (PSIB–PSOE)
Santa Eulària des Riu	36,189	People's Party (PP)	People's Party (PP)

== Municipalities ==
=== Calvià ===
Population: 50,363

← Summary of the 24 May 2015 City Council of Calvià election results →
Parties and alliances	Popular vote			Seats	
Parties and alliances	Votes	%	±pp	Total	+/−
Socialist Party of the Balearic Islands (PSIB–PSOE)	5,736	34.42	+0.85	10	−1
People's Party (PP)	5,589	33.54	−10.07	9	−5
Yes We Can Calvià (SSPCalvià)	1,680	10.08	New	2	+2
Citizens–Party of the Citizenry (C's)	1,237	7.42	New	2	+2
Calvià Open Left (EU–Més)^{1}	1,196	7.18	+0.64	2	+2
Proposal for the Isles (El Pi)^{2}	638	3.83	−1.73	0	±0
Transparency for Calvià Civic Candidacy (TRxC)	178	1.07	−2.89	0	±0
Union, Progress and Democracy (UPyD)	166	1.00	−1.18	0	±0
Blank ballots	244	1.46	−1.10		
Total	16,664			25	±0
Valid votes	16,664	98.89	−0.04		
Invalid votes	187	1.11	+0.04		
Votes cast / turnout	16,851	53.79	−1.78		
Abstentions	14,475	46.21	+1.78		
Registered voters	31,326				
Sources
Footnotes: ^{1} Calvià Open Left results are compared to the combined totals of Socialist Party of Mallorca–Initiative Greens–Agreement and United Left of the Balearic Islands in the 2011 election.; ^{2} Proposal for the Isles results are compared to the combined totals of Regionalist League of the Balearic Islands and Convergence for the Isles in the 2011 election.

=== Ciutadella de Menorca ===
Population: 29,282

← Summary of the 24 May 2015 City Council of Ciutadella de Menorca election results →
Parties and alliances	Popular vote			Seats	
Parties and alliances	Votes	%	±pp	Total	+/−
Socialist Party of Menorca–More for Menorca (PSM–MpM)^{1}	3,019	27.73	+8.73	6	+2
People's Party (PP)	2,944	27.04	−15.23	6	−4
Socialist Party of the Balearic Islands (PSIB–PSOE)	1,751	16.08	−3.78	4	−1
People for Ciutadella (GxC)^{2}	1,394	12.80	+9.93	3	+3
Ciutadella de Menorca People's Union (UPCM)	1,037	9.52	+0.59	2	±0
Proposal for the Isles (El Pi)^{3}	423	3.88	+0.90	0	±0
Blank ballots	321	2.95	−0.46		
Total	10,889			21	±0
Valid votes	10,889	98.25	−0.07		
Invalid votes	194	1.75	+0.07		
Votes cast / turnout	11,083	51.47	−4.70		
Abstentions	10,450	48.53	+4.70		
Registered voters	21,533				
Sources
Footnotes: ^{1} Socialist Party of Menorca–More for Menorca results are compared to Socialist Party of Menorca–Nationalist Agreement totals in the 2011 election.; ^{2} People for Ciutadella results are compared to Left of Menorca–United Left totals in the 2011 election.; ^{3} Proposal for the Isles results are compared to Menorcan Union totals in the 2011 election.

=== Ibiza ===
Population: 49,693

← Summary of the 24 May 2015 City Council of Ibiza election results →
Parties and alliances	Popular vote			Seats	
Parties and alliances	Votes	%	±pp	Total	+/−
People's Party (PP)	4,690	31.26	−13.85	8	−3
Socialist Party of the Balearic Islands (PSIB–PSOE)^{1}	4,325	28.83	n/a	8	+1
Let's Win Ibiza (Guanyem)^{2}	2,458	16.38	+6.32	4	+3
EPIC Ibiza Citizen Movement (mcEPIC)	1,002	6.68	New	1	+1
More Ibiza–Democratic Corsairs (MEC)	701	4.67	New	0	±0
Republican Left–Ibiza Yes–Municipal Agreement (ER–Eivissa Sí–AM)^{1}	474	3.16	n/a	0	±0
Union, Progress and Democracy (UPyD)	365	2.43	−0.53	0	±0
Renewal Party of Ibiza and Formentera (PREF)	351	2.34	New	0	±0
Island Alternative (AL–in)^{3}	219	1.46	−3.61	0	−1
People for Ibiza (GxE)^{1}	n/a	n/a	n/a	0	−1
Blank ballots	417	2.78	−1.35		
Total	15,002			21	±0
Valid votes	15,002	98.41	+0.44		
Invalid votes	242	1.59	−0.44		
Votes cast / turnout	15,244	47.23	−2.94		
Abstentions	17,031	52.76	+2.94		
Registered voters	32,275				
Sources
Footnotes: ^{1} Within the PSOE–Pact for Ibiza coalition in the 2011 election.; ^{2} Let's Win Ibiza results are compared to the combined totals of Ibiza for Change and Nationalist and Ecologist Agreement in the 2011 election.; ^{3} Island Alternative results are compared to New Alternative totals in the 2011 election.

=== Inca ===
Population: 30,625

← Summary of the 24 May 2015 City Council of Inca election results →
Parties and alliances	Popular vote			Seats	
Parties and alliances	Votes	%	±pp	Total	+/−
Socialist Party of the Balearic Islands (PSIB–PSOE)	3,841	30.33	+6.21	7	+1
People's Party (PP)	3,490	27.56	−14.91	6	−5
More for Mallorca–APIB (Més–APIB)^{1}	1,798	14.20	+4.73	3	+1
Independents of Inca (INDI)	1,672	13.20	+2.03	3	+1
Proposal for the Isles (El Pi)^{2}	1,021	8.06	+0.38	2	+2
Let's Win Inca: Unitary Left (Guanyem)^{3}	526	4.10	+1.87	0	±0
Union, Progress and Democracy (UPyD)	149	1.18	−0.13	0	±0
Blank ballots	168	1.33	−0.22		
Total	12,665			21	±0
Valid votes	12,665	99.15	+0.13		
Invalid votes	109	0.85	−0.13		
Votes cast / turnout	12,774	61.59	−0.94		
Abstentions	7,966	38.41	+0.94		
Registered voters	20,740				
Sources
Footnotes: ^{1} More for Inca–APIB results are compared to Socialist Party of Mallorca–Initiative Greens totals in the 2011 election.; ^{2} Proposal for the Isles results are compared to the combined totals of Regionalist League of the Balearic Islands and Convergence for the Isles in the 2011 election.; ^{3} Let's Win Inca: Unitary Left results are compared to United Left of the Balearic Islands totals in the 2011 election.

=== Llucmajor ===
Population: 34,602

← Summary of the 24 May 2015 City Council of Llucmajor election results →
Parties and alliances	Popular vote			Seats	
Parties and alliances	Votes	%	±pp	Total	+/−
People's Party (PP)	3,942	29.29	−17.42	8	−4
Socialist Party of the Balearic Islands (PSIB–PSOE)	2,727	20.26	−0.08	5	±0
More for Mallorca–APIB (Més–APIB)^{1}	2,018	14.99	+5.36	4	+2
Proposal for the Isles (El Pi)^{2}	1,283	9.53	+2.56	2	+1
Yes We Can Llucmajor (SSPLL)	933	6.93	New	1	+1
Independent Social Group (ASI)	850	6.32	+0.24	1	±0
Let's Win Llucmajor: Unitary Left (Guanyem)^{3}	552	4.10	+1.36	0	±0
Union, Progress and Democracy (UPyD)	401	2.98	−0.05	0	±0
Union of Independent Citizens (UCIN)	223	1.66	New	0	±0
Spanish Liberal Project (PLIE)	114	0.85	+0.05	0	±0
Independents for the Municipality of Llucmajor (ixLl)	107	0.80	New	0	±0
Blank ballots	309	2.30	−0.81		
Total	13,459			21	±0
Valid votes	13,459	98.36	+0.54		
Invalid votes	225	1.64	−0.54		
Votes cast / turnout	13,684	55.89	+0.17		
Abstentions	10,799	44.11	−0.17		
Registered voters	24,483				
Sources
Footnotes: ^{1} More for Llucmajor–APIB results are compared to the combined totals of Socialist Party of Mallorca–Nationalist Agreement and Republican Left–Municipal Agreement in the 2011 election.; ^{2} Proposal for the Isles results are compared to the combined totals of Convergence for the Isles and Regionalist League of the Balearic Islands in the 2011 election.; ^{3} Let's Win Llucmajor: Unitary Left results are compared to United Left of the Balearic Islands totals in the 2011 election.

=== Manacor ===
Population: 40,264

← Summary of the 24 May 2015 City Council of Manacor election results →
Parties and alliances	Popular vote			Seats	
Parties and alliances	Votes	%	±pp	Total	+/−
Més per Mallorca–Republican Left (Més–esquerra)^{1}	3,486	22.52	+5.68	5	+2
Proposal for the Isles (El Pi)^{2}	3,020	19.51	+7.12	5	+3
People's Party (PP)	2,935	18.96	−21.43	4	−7
Socialist Party of the Balearic Islands (PSIB–PSOE)	2,125	13.73	+0.54	3	±0
Independent Group of Porto Cristo–S'illoters and Sympathisers (AIPC–SYS)^{3}	1,841	11.89	+0.55	3	+1
We Want Manacor (Volem Manacor)	1,093	7.06	New	1	+1
Let's Win Manacor: Unitary Left (Guanyem)^{4}	400	2.58	+0.54	0	±0
Union, Progress and Democracy (UPyD)	164	1.06	+0.13	0	±0
Independent Green Ecologists of the Balearics (ECOVIB)	137	0.89	+0.51	0	±0
Blank ballots	278	1.80	−0.39		
Total	15,479			21	±0
Valid votes	15,479	98.67	−0.30		
Invalid votes	208	1.33	+0.30		
Votes cast / turnout	15,687	57.61	−1.05		
Abstentions	11,545	42.39	+1.05		
Registered voters	27,232				
Sources
Footnotes: ^{1} More for Manacor–Republican Left results are compared to the combined totals of Socialist Party of Mallorca–Initiative Greens–Agreement and Republican Left in the 2011 election.; ^{2} Proposal for the Isles results are compared to the combined totals of Liberal Alternative for Manacor and Regionalist League of the Balearic Islands in the 2011 election.; ^{3} Independent Council of Porto Cristo–S'illoters and Sympathisers results are compared to the combined totals of Independent Council of Porto Cristo and S'illoters and Sympathisers in the 2011 election.; ^{4} Let's Win Manacor: Unitary Left results are compared to United Left of the Balearic Islands totals in the 2011 election.

=== Maó-Mahón ===
Population: 28,460

← Summary of the 24 May 2015 City Council of Maó-Mahon election results →
Parties and alliances	Popular vote			Seats	
Parties and alliances	Votes	%	±pp	Total	+/−
People's Party (PP)	4,275	36.02	−11.56	8	−5
Now Maó (Ara Maó)^{1}	3,280	27.64	+16.74	6	+6
Socialist Party of the Balearic Islands (PSIB–PSOE)	3,037	25.59	−5.30	6	−2
Citizens of Menorca (CMe)	669	5.64	+2.39	1	+1
Proposal for the Isles (El Pi)^{2}	362	3.05	+1.48	0	±0
Blank ballots	246	2.07	−0.41		
Total	11,869			21	±0
Valid votes	11,869	98.69	−0.03		
Invalid votes	158	1.31	+0.03		
Votes cast / turnout	12,027	59.42	+1.46		
Abstentions	8,213	40.58	−1.46		
Registered voters	20,240				
Sources
Footnotes: ^{1} Now Maó results are compared to the combined totals of Left of Menorca–United Left, Socialist Party of Menorca–Nationalist Agreement and The Greens of Menorca in the 2011 election.; ^{2} Proposal for the Isles results are compared to Menorcan Union totals in the 2011 election.

=== Marratxí ===
Population: 35,521

← Summary of the 24 May 2015 City Council of Marratxí election results →
Parties and alliances	Popular vote			Seats	
Parties and alliances	Votes	%	±pp	Total	+/−
People's Party (PP)	5,777	34.53	−13.71	8	−5
More for Mallorca–APIB (Més–APIB)^{1}	3,473	20.76	+10.15	5	+3
Socialist Party of the Balearic Islands (PSIB–PSOE)	3,134	18.74	+1.20	4	±0
Let's Win Marratxí: Unitary Left (Guanyem)^{2}	2,017	12.06	+9.59	3	+3
Independents of Marratxí–Proposal for the Isles (IdMa–El Pi)^{3}	1,334	7.97	−6.47	1	−1
Union, Progress and Democracy (UPyD)	583	3.49	+1.23	0	±0
Blank ballots	409	2.45	+0.02		
Total	16,728			21	±0
Valid votes	16,728	98.38	+0.81		
Invalid votes	275	1.62	−0.81		
Votes cast / turnout	17,003	63.04	−0.81		
Abstentions	9,968	36.96	+0.81		
Registered voters	26,971				
Sources
Footnotes: ^{1} More for Marratxí–APIB results are compared to Socialist Party of Mallorca–Initiative Greens–Agreement totals in the 2011 election.; ^{2} Let's Win Marratxí: Unitary Left results are compared to United Left of the Balearic Islands totals in the 2011 election.; ^{3} Independents of Marratxí–Proposal for the Isles results are compared to the combined totals of Independents of Marratxí, Convergence for the Isles and Regionalist League of the Balearic Islands in the 2011 election.

=== Palma de Mallorca ===
Population: 399,093

← Summary of the 24 May 2015 City Council of Palma election results →
Parties and alliances	Popular vote			Seats	
Parties and alliances	Votes	%	±pp	Total	+/−
People's Party (PP)	40,402	26.53	−21.64	9	−8
Socialist Party of the Balearic Islands (PSIB–PSOE)	28,927	18.99	−7.90	6	−3
More for Mallorca–APIB (Més–APIB)^{1}	23,927	15.71	+7.45	5	+2
We Are Palma (SomPalma)	22,508	14.78	New	5	+5
Citizens–Party of the Citizenry (C's)	17,857	11.72	+11.32	4	+4
Let's Win Palma: Unitary Left (Guanyem Palma)^{2}	6,107	4.01	+0.22	0	±0
Proposal for the Isles (El Pi)^{3}	5,616	3.69	+0.78	0	±0
Union, Progress and Democracy (UPyD)	2,355	1.55	−1.65	0	±0
Family and Life Party (PFyV)	692	0.45	+0.22	0	±0
Spanish Liberal Project (PLIE)	405	0.27	+0.02	0	±0
Islander Party of the Balearic Islands (PIIB)	371	0.24	+0.12	0	±0
Libertarian Party (P–LIB)	346	0.23	New	0	±0
Blank ballots	2,802	1.84	−0.87		
Total	152,315			29	±0
Valid votes	152,315	98.70	+0.15		
Invalid votes	1,999	1.30	−0.15		
Votes cast / turnout	154,314	54.49	+0.10		
Abstentions	128,902	45.51	−0.10		
Registered voters	283,216				
Sources
Footnotes: ^{1} More for Palma–APIB results are compared to Socialist Party of Mallorca–Initiative Greens–Agreement totals in the 2011 election.; ^{2} Let's Win Palma: Unitary Left results are compared to United Left of the Balearic Islands totals in the 2011 election.; ^{3} Proposal for the Isles results are compared to the combined totals of Convergence for the Isles and Regionalist League of the Balearic Islands in the 2011 election.

=== Sant Antoni de Portmany ===
Population: 23,359

← Summary of the 24 May 2015 City Council of Sant Antoni de Portmany election results →
Parties and alliances	Popular vote			Seats	
Parties and alliances	Votes	%	±pp	Total	+/−
People's Party (PP)	2,813	33.88	−16.20	8	−4
Socialist Party of the Balearic Islands (PSIB–PSOE)	2,283	27.50	−4.00	6	−1
Restart Sant Antoni (Reinicia)^{1}	1,497	18.03	+13.20	4	+4
Proposal for the Isles (El Pi)^{2}	1,243	14.97	+4.66	3	+1
More Ibiza–Democratic Corsairs (MEC)	129	1.55	New	0	±0
Union, Progress and Democracy (UPyD)	93	1.12	New	0	±0
Renewal Party of Ibiza and Formentera (PREF)	81	0.98	New	0	±0
Blank ballots	163	1.96	−1.32		
Total	8,302			21	±0
Valid votes	8,302	98.94	+0.44		
Invalid votes	89	1.06	−0.44		
Votes cast / turnout	8,391	53.37	−3.65		
Abstentions	7,332	46.63	+3.65		
Registered voters	15,723				
Sources
Footnotes: ^{1} Restart Sant Antoni results are compared to the combined totals of Ibiza for Change and Sustainable Ibiza in the 2011 election.; ^{2} Proposal for the Isles results are compared to New Alternative totals in the 2011 election.

=== Sant Josep de sa Talaia ===
Population: 25,362

← Summary of the 24 May 2015 City Council of Sant Josep de sa Talaia election results →
Parties and alliances	Popular vote			Seats	
Parties and alliances	Votes	%	±pp	Total	+/−
Socialist Party of the Balearic Islands (PSIB–PSOE)	2,731	32.67	−7.72	9	−1
People's Party (PP)	2,089	24.99	−14.48	6	−3
Let's Win Sant Josep de sa Talaia (Guanyem)^{1}	1,221	14.61	+9.89	4	+4
Island Alternative (AL–in)^{2}	702	8.40	−2.06	2	±0
Republican Left–Ibiza Yes–Municipal Agreement (ER–Eivissa Sí–AM)	384	4.59	New	0	±0
More Ibiza–Democratic Corsairs (MEC)	322	3.85	New	0	±0
EPIC Ibiza Citizen Movement (mcEPIC)	235	2.81	New	0	±0
21st Century Liberal Movement (MLS)	210	2.51	New	0	±0
Union, Progress and Democracy (UPyD)	181	2.17	+0.01	0	±0
Renewal Party of Ibiza and Formentera (PREF)	73	0.87	New	0	±0
Blank ballots	211	2.52	−0.28		
Total	8,359			21	±0
Valid votes	8,359	99.10	+0.23		
Invalid votes	76	0.90	−0.23		
Votes cast / turnout	8,435	47.09	−2.15		
Abstentions	9,479	52.91	+2.15		
Registered voters	17,914				
Sources
Footnotes: ^{1} Let's Win Sant Josep de sa Talaia results are compared to Ibiza for Change totals in the 2011 election.; ^{2} Island Alternative results are compared to New Alternative totals in the 2011 election.

=== Santa Eulària des Riu ===
Population: 36,189

← Summary of the 24 May 2015 City Council of Santa Eulària des Riu election results →
Parties and alliances	Popular vote			Seats	
Parties and alliances	Votes	%	±pp	Total	+/−
People's Party (PP)	5,023	48.27	−11.78	12	−2
Socialist Party of the Balearic Islands (PSIB–PSOE)^{1}	2,281	21.92	n/a	5	±0
Let's Win Santa Eulària des Riu (Guanyem)^{2}	1,589	15.27	+6.23	4	+3
EPIC Ibiza Citizen Movement (mcEPIC)	330	3.17	New	0	±0
More Ibiza–Democratic Corsairs (MEC)	274	2.63	New	0	±0
Republican Left–Ibiza Yes–Municipal Agreement (ER–Eivissa Sí–AM)^{1}	261	2.51	n/a	0	±0
Union, Progress and Democracy (UPyD)	239	2.30	−0.25	0	±0
Island Alternative (AL–in)	128	1.23	New	0	±0
People for Ibiza (GxE)^{1}	n/a	n/a	n/a	0	−1
Blank ballots	281	2.70	−0.53		
Total	10,406			21	±0
Valid votes	10,406	98.40	+0.17		
Invalid votes	169	1.60	−0.17		
Votes cast / turnout	10,575	46.19	−2.30		
Abstentions	12,321	53.81	+2.30		
Registered voters	22,896				
Sources
Footnotes: ^{1} Within the PSOE–Pact for Ibiza coalition in the 2011 election.; ^{2} Let's Win Santa Eulària des Riu results are compared to the combined totals of Ibiza for Change and Sustainable Ibiza in the 2011 election.

== See also ==
- 2015 Balearic regional election
