= 2011 Spanish local elections in the Balearic Islands =

This article presents the results breakdown of the local elections held in the Balearic Islands on 22 May 2011. The following tables show detailed results in the autonomous community's most populous municipalities, sorted alphabetically.

== City control ==
The following table lists party control in the most populous municipalities, including provincial capitals (shown in bold). Gains for a party are displayed with the cell's background shaded in that party's colour.

Municipality	Population	Previous control	New control
Calvià	51,462	People's Party (PP)	People's Party (PP)
Ciutadella de Menorca	29,247	Socialist Party of the Balearic Islands (PSIB–PSOE)	People's Party (PP)
Ibiza	49,516	Socialist Party of the Balearic Islands (PSIB–PSOE)	People's Party (PP)
Inca	29,321	People's Party (PP)	People's Party (PP)
Llucmajor	36,681	People's Party (PP)	People's Party (PP)
Manacor	40,859	People's Party (PP)	People's Party (PP) (CpM in 2012)
Maó-Mahón	29,050	Socialist Party of the Balearic Islands (PSIB–PSOE)	People's Party (PP)
**Palma**	404,681	Socialist Party of the Balearic Islands (PSIB–PSOE)	People's Party (PP)
Santa Eulària des Riu	32,637	People's Party (PP)	People's Party (PP)

== Municipalities ==
=== Calvià ===
Population: 51,462

← Summary of the 22 May 2011 City Council of Calvià election results →
Parties and alliances	Popular vote			Seats	
Parties and alliances	Votes	%	±pp	Total	+/−
People's Party (PP)	7,289	43.62	−5.97	14	+2
Socialist Party of the Balearic Islands (PSIB–PSOE)	5,610	33.57	−0.33	11	+3
Transparency for Calvià Civic Candidacy (TRxC)	661	3.96	New	0	±0
Socialist Party of Mallorca–InitiativeGreens–Agreement (PSM–IV–ExM–APIB)^{1}	618	3.70	n/a	0	±0
Regionalist League of the Balearic Islands (IB–Lliga)	522	3.12	New	0	±0
United Left of the Balearic Islands (EUIB)^{1}	475	2.84	n/a	0	±0
Convergence for the Isles (CxI)^{2}	408	2.44	−5.55	0	−1
Union, Progress and Democracy (UPyD)	365	2.18	New	0	±0
Calvià Alternative (AC)	203	1.21	−0.80	0	±0
Citizens of Democratic Centre (CCD)	81	0.48	New	0	±0
Republican Left of Catalonia–Municipal Agreement (esquerra–AM)	51	0.31	−0.06	0	±0
Blank ballots	427	2.56	+1.09		
Total	16,710			25	+4
Valid votes	16,710	98.93	−0.68		
Invalid votes	181	1.07	+0.68		
Votes cast / turnout	16,891	55.57	−3.77		
Abstentions	13,503	44.43	+3.77		
Registered voters	30,394				
Sources
Footnotes: ^{1} Within the Bloc for Calvià alliance in the 2007 election.; ^{2} Convergence for the Isles results are compared to Majorcan Union totals in the 2007 election.

=== Ciutadella de Menorca ===
Population: 29,247

← Summary of the 22 May 2011 City Council of Ciutadella de Menorca election results →
Parties and alliances	Popular vote			Seats	
Parties and alliances	Votes	%	±pp	Total	+/−
People's Party (PP)	4,915	42.27	+2.81	10	±0
Socialist Party of the Balearic Islands (PSIB–PSOE)	2,309	19.86	−6.77	5	−1
Socialist Party of Menorca–Nationalist Agreement (PSM–EN)	2,210	19.00	+3.77	4	±0
Ciutadella de Menorca People's Union (UPCM)	1,038	8.93	+3.73	2	+1
Menorcan Union (UMe)^{1}	346	2.98	−0.94	0	±0
Left of Menorca–United Left (EM–EU)	334	2.87	−0.83	0	±0
Ciutadella Democratic Party (PDCT)	80	0.69	New	0	±0
Blank ballots	397	3.41	+1.67		
Total	11,629			21	±0
Valid votes	11,629	98.32	−1.16		
Invalid votes	199	1.68	+1.16		
Votes cast / turnout	11,828	56.17	−2.29		
Abstentions	9,229	43.83	+2.29		
Registered voters	21,057				
Sources
Footnotes: ^{1} Menorcan Union results are compared to Union of Centrists of Menorca totals in the 2007 election.

=== Ibiza ===
Population: 49,516

← Summary of the 22 May 2011 City Council of Ibiza election results →
Parties and alliances	Popular vote			Seats	
Parties and alliances	Votes	%	±pp	Total	+/−
People's Party (PP)	6,759	45.11	+3.79	11	+2
PSOE–Pact for Ibiza (PSOE–PxE)^{1}	4,896	32.68	n/a	8	±0
Ibiza for Change (ExC)^{1}	1,180	7.88	n/a	1	−2
New Alternative (Nov–A)	759	5.07	New	1	+1
Union, Progress and Democracy (UPyD)	443	2.96	New	0	±0
Nationalist and Ecologist Agreement (ENE)^{1}	327	2.18	n/a	0	−1
Blank ballots	619	4.13	+1.52		
Total	14,983			21	±0
Valid votes	14,983	97.97	−1.48		
Invalid votes	310	2.03	+1.48		
Votes cast / turnout	15,293	50.17	−2.68		
Abstentions	15,190	49.83	+2.68		
Registered voters	30,483				
Sources
Footnotes: ^{1} Within the PSOE–Ibiza for Change coalition in the 2007 election.

=== Inca ===
Population: 29,321

← Summary of the 22 May 2011 City Council of Inca election results →
Parties and alliances	Popular vote			Seats	
Parties and alliances	Votes	%	±pp	Total	+/−
People's Party (PP)	5,325	42.47	−9.19	11	−1
Socialist Party of the Balearic Islands (PSIB–PSOE)	3,024	24.12	−0.90	6	±0
Independents of Inca (INDI)	1,401	11.17	+3.75	2	+1
Socialist Party of Mallorca–Initiative Greens (PSM–IV–APIB)^{1}	1,187	9.47	n/a	2	±0
Regionalist League of the Balearic Islands (IB–Lliga)	562	4.48	New	0	±0
Convergence for the Isles (CxI)^{2}	401	3.20	−1.26	0	±0
United Left of the Balearic Islands (EU)^{1}	280	2.23	n/a	0	±0
Union, Progress and Democracy (UPyD)	164	1.31	New	0	±0
Blank ballots	194	1.55	+0.22		
Total	12,538			21	±0
Valid votes	12,538	99.02	−0.57		
Invalid votes	124	0.98	+0.57		
Votes cast / turnout	12,662	62.53	−0.49		
Abstentions	7,589	36.98	+0.49		
Registered voters	20,251				
Sources
Footnotes: ^{1} Within the Bloc for Inca alliance in the 2007 election.; ^{2} Convergence for the Isles results are compared to Majorcan Union totals in the 2007 election.

=== Llucmajor ===
Population: 36,681

← Summary of the 22 May 2011 City Council of Llucmajor election results →
Parties and alliances	Popular vote			Seats	
Parties and alliances	Votes	%	±pp	Total	+/−
People's Party (PP)	6,158	46.71	+3.22	12	+2
Socialist Party of the Balearic Islands (PSIB–PSOE)	2,682	20.34	−9.02	5	−2
Socialist Party of Mallorca–Nationalist Agreement (PSM–EN–APIB)^{1}	1,108	8.40	n/a	2	±0
Independent Social Group (ASI)	801	6.08	−1.42	1	±0
Convergence for the Isles (CxI)^{2}	697	5.29	−1.21	1	±0
Union, Progress and Democracy (UPyD)	400	3.03	New	0	±0
United Left of the Balearic Islands (EUIB)^{1}	361	2.74	n/a	0	±0
Regionalist League of the Balearic Islands (IB–Lliga)	221	1.68	New	0	±0
Republican Left–Municipal Agreement (esquerra–AM)	162	1.23	New	0	±0
Spanish Liberal Project (PLIE)	106	0.80	New	0	±0
Republican Social Movement (MSR)	78	0.59	New	0	±0
Blank ballots	410	3.11	+0.94		
Total	13,184			21	±0
Valid votes	13,184	97.82	−1.28		
Invalid votes	294	2.18	+1.28		
Votes cast / turnout	13,478	55.72	−1.79		
Abstentions	10,711	44.28	+1.79		
Registered voters	24,189				
Sources
Footnotes: ^{1} Within the Bloc for Llucmajor alliance in the 2007 election.; ^{2} Convergence for the Isles results are compared to Majorcan Union totals in the 2007 election.

=== Manacor ===
Population: 40,859

← Summary of the 22 May 2011 City Council of Manacor election results →
Parties and alliances	Popular vote			Seats	
Parties and alliances	Votes	%	±pp	Total	+/−
People's Party (PP)	6,190	40.39	−3.28	11	+1
Socialist Party of the Balearic Islands (PSIB–PSOE)	2,021	13.19	+0.04	3	±0
Socialist Party of Mallorca–Initiative Greens–Agreement (PSM–IV–ExM–APIB)^{1}	1,616	10.54	n/a	2	±0
Independent Group of Porto Cristo (AIPC)	1,492	9.74	+0.59	2	±0
Liberal Alternative for Manacor (ALM)	1,298	8.47	−6.20	2	−1
Republican Left (esquerra)^{1}	965	6.30	n/a	1	±0
Regionalist League of the Balearic Islands (IB–Lliga)	601	3.92	New	0	±0
United Left of the Balearic Islands (EU)	312	2.04	−1.94	0	±0
S'illoters and Sympathisers (SYS)	245	1.60	New	0	±0
Union, Progress and Democracy (UPyD)	143	0.93	New	0	±0
Independent Green Ecologists of the Balearics (ECOVIB)	59	0.38	New	0	±0
Stellar Blue Party (PAES)	48	0.31	New	0	±0
Blank ballots	336	2.19	+0.76		
Total	15,326			21	±0
Valid votes	15,326	98.97	−0.55		
Invalid votes	159	1.03	+0.55		
Votes cast / turnout	15,485	58.66	−1.45		
Abstentions	10,914	41.34	+1.45		
Registered voters	26,399				
Sources
Footnotes: ^{1} Within the Socialist Party of Mallorca–Republican Left–Greens alliance in the 2007 election.

=== Maó-Mahón ===
Population: 29,050

← Summary of the 22 May 2011 City Council of Maó-Mahón election results →
Parties and alliances	Popular vote			Seats	
Parties and alliances	Votes	%	±pp	Total	+/−
People's Party (PP)	5,450	47.58	+9.82	13	+5
Socialist Party of the Balearic Islands (PSIB–PSOE)	3,538	30.89	−7.33	8	−1
Left of Menorca–United Left (EM–EU)	564	4.92	−1.56	0	−1
Citizens for Blank Votes (CenB)	381	3.33	New	0	±0
Socialist Party of Menorca–Nationalist Agreement (PSM–EN)^{1}	381	3.33	n/a	0	−2
Citizens of Menorca (CMe)	372	3.25	−3.13	0	−1
The Greens of Menorca (EV–Me)^{1}	304	2.65	n/a	0	±0
Menorcan Union (UMe)	180	1.57	New	0	±0
Blank ballots	284	2.48	+0.26		
Total	11,454			21	±0
Valid votes	11,454	98.72	−0.69		
Invalid votes	148	1.28	+0.69		
Votes cast / turnout	11,602	57.96	+1.50		
Abstentions	8,416	42.04	−1.50		
Registered voters	20,018				
Sources
Footnotes: ^{1} Within the PSM–Nationalist Agreement–The Greens of Menorca alliance in the 2007 election.

=== Palma ===
Population: 404,681

← Summary of the 22 May 2011 City Council of Palma election results →
Parties and alliances	Popular vote			Seats	
Parties and alliances	Votes	%	±pp	Total	+/−
People's Party (PP)	69,713	48.17	+2.12	17	+3
Socialist Party of the Balearic Islands (PSIB–PSOE)	38,913	26.89	−8.52	9	−2
Socialist Party of Mallorca–Initiative Greens–Agreement (PSM–IV–ExM–APIB)^{1}	11,948	8.26	n/a	3	+2
United Left of the Balearic Islands (EUIB)^{1}	5,487	3.79	n/a	0	−1
Union, Progress and Democracy (UPyD)	4,636	3.20	New	0	±0
Convergence for the Isles (CxI)^{2}	2,231	1.54	−5.05	0	−2
Regionalist League of the Balearic Islands (IB–Lliga)	1,981	1.37	New	0	±0
Republican Left–Municipal Agreement (esquerra–AM)^{1}	1,549	1.07	n/a	0	±0
Citizens for Blank Votes (CenB)	1,470	1.02	New	0	±0
Citizens–Party of the Citizenry (C's)	577	0.40	New	0	±0
Citizens of Democratic Centre (CCD)	398	0.28	New	0	±0
Workers for Democracy (TD)	380	0.26	+0.08	0	±0
Spanish Liberal Project (PLIE)	368	0.25	New	0	±0
Independent Social Group (ASI)	341	0.24	−0.23	0	±0
Family and Life Party (PFyV)	334	0.23	New	0	±0
Republican Social Movement (MSR)	190	0.13	New	0	±0
Islander Party of the Balearic Islands (PIIB)	179	0.12	+0.01	0	±0
Balearic Radical Party (PRB+i)	90	0.06	New	0	±0
Blank ballots	3,928	2.71	+0.80		
Total	144,713			29	±0
Valid votes	144,713	98.55	−0.90		
Invalid votes	2,136	1.45	+0.90		
Votes cast / turnout	146,849	54.39	+1.22		
Abstentions	123,144	45.61	−1.22		
Registered voters	269,993				
Sources
Footnotes: ^{1} Within the Bloc for Palma alliance in the 2007 election.; ^{2} Convergence for the Isles results are compared to Majorcan Union totals in the 2007 election.

=== Santa Eulària des Riu ===
Population: 32,637

← Summary of the 22 May 2011 City Council of Santa Eulària des Riu election results →
Parties and alliances	Popular vote			Seats	
Parties and alliances	Votes	%	±pp	Total	+/−
People's Party (PP)	5,861	60.05	−0.68	14	+1
PSOE–Pact for Ibiza (PSOE–PxE)^{1}	2,453	25.13	n/a	6	+1
Ibiza for Change (ExC)^{1}	578	5.92	n/a	1	−2
Sustainable Ibiza (ESOS)	305	3.12	New	0	±0
Union, Progress and Democracy (UPyD)	249	2.55	New	0	±0
Blank ballots	315	3.23	+0.51		
Total	9,761			21	±0
Valid votes	9,761	98.23	−0.82		
Invalid votes	176	1.77	+0.82		
Votes cast / turnout	9,937	48.49	−3.62		
Abstentions	10,555	51.51	+3.62		
Registered voters	20,492				
Sources
Footnotes: ^{1} Within the PSOE–Ibiza for Change coalition in the 2007 election.

== See also ==
- 2011 Balearic regional election
