= 2011 Balearic regional election =

Election in the Spanish region of the Balearic Islands

- 22 May 2011

All 59 seats in the Parliament of the Balearic Islands 30 seats needed for a majority
- Opinion polls
- Registered: 726,287 ▲1.0%
- Turnout: 427,093 (58.8%) ▼1.3 pp
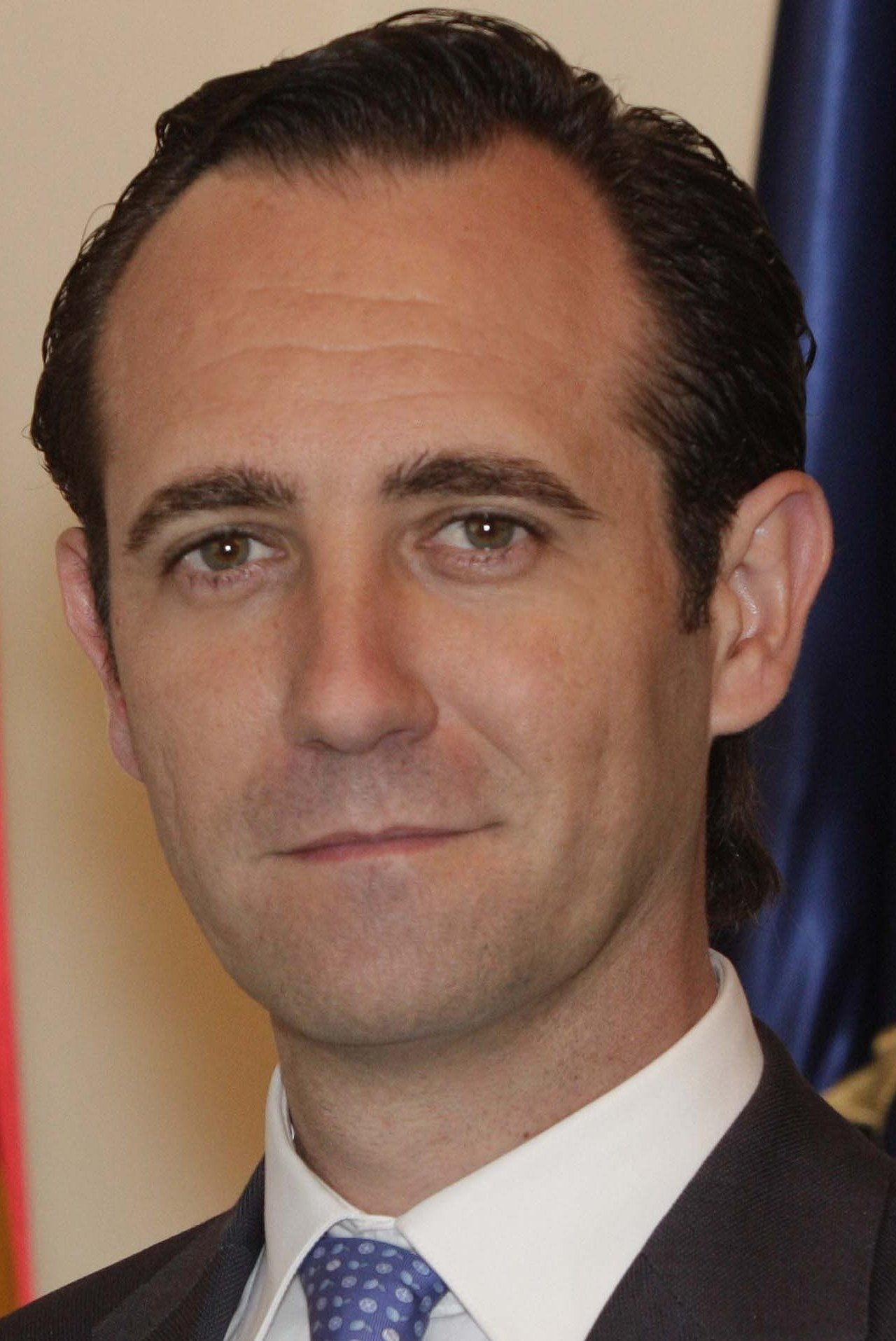

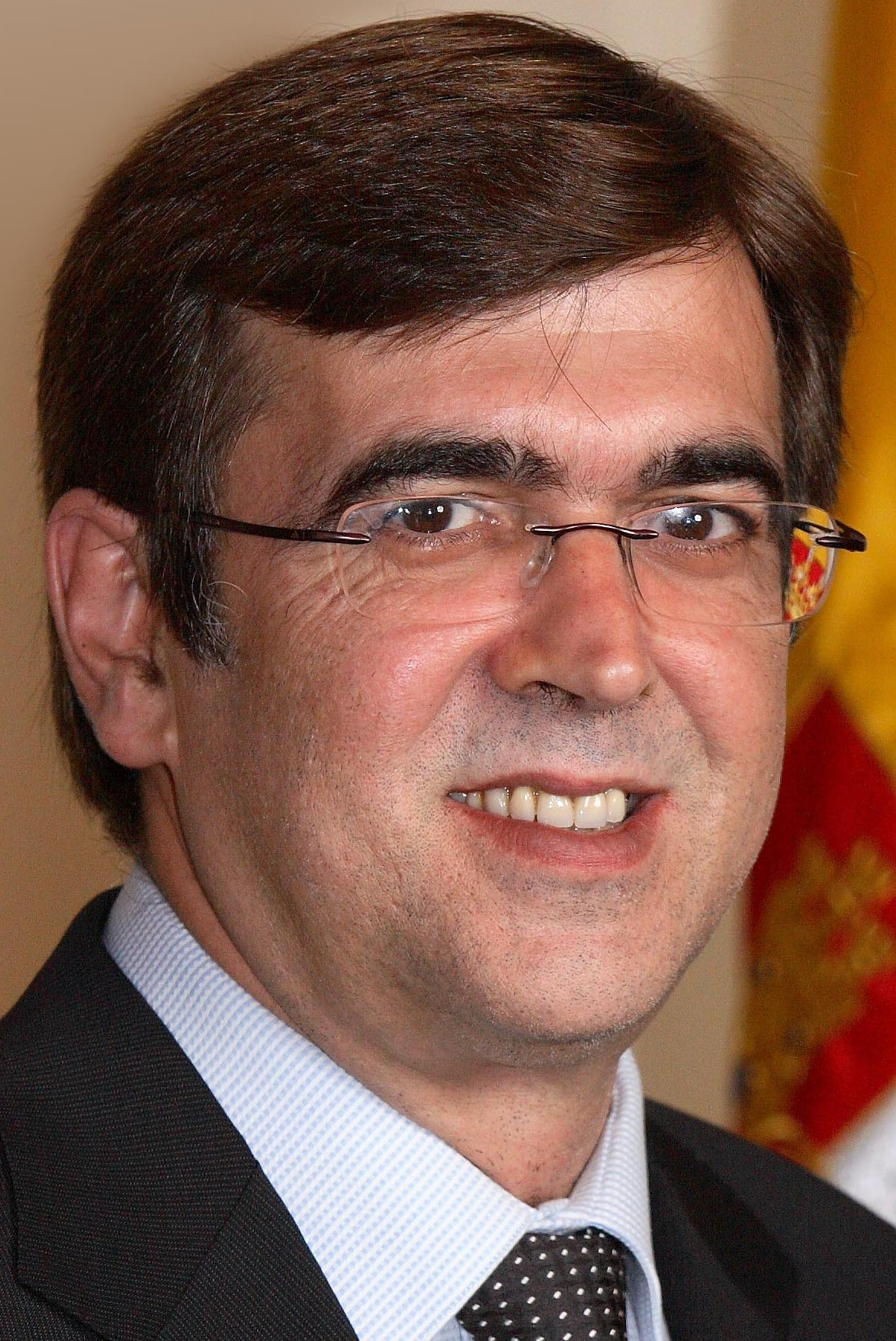

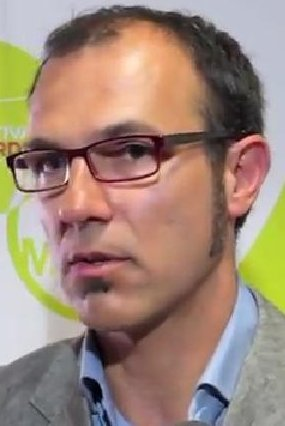

	First party	Second party	Third party
Leader	José Ramón Bauzá	Francesc Antich	Biel Barceló
Party	PP	PSIB–PSOE	PSM–IV–ExM
Leader since	11 September 2009	9 November 1998	27 May 2006
Leader's seat	Mallorca	Mallorca	Mallorca
Last election	28 seats, 46.0%	16 seats, 27.6%	3 seats (Bloc) (Note: Results for Bloc (9.0%, 4 seats; comprising PSM (3 seats) and EUIB (1 seat)) and EM–EU (0.4%, 0 seats) in the 2007 election.)
Seats won	35	14	4
Seat change	▲7	▼2	▲1
Popular vote	194,861	90,008	36,181
Percentage	46.4%	21.4%	8.6%
Swing	▲0.4 pp	▼6.2 pp	n/a
	Fourth party	Fifth party	Sixth party
Leader	Xico Tarrés	Nel Martí	Jaume Ferrer
Party	PSOE–PxE	PSM–EN	GxF+PSOE
Leader since	2007	19 February 2011	21 October 2006
Leader's seat	Ibiza	Menorca	Formentera
Last election	5 seats (ExC) (Note: Within the PSOE–ExC alliance in the 2007 election: PSIB–PSOE (4 seats), EUIB (1 seat) and ERC (1 seat).)	1 seat, 0.8%	0 seats, 0.3%
Seats won	4	1	1
Seat change	▼1	0	▲1
Popular vote	12,716	3,723	1,904
Percentage	3.0%	0.9%	0.5%
Swing	n/a	▲0.1 pp	▲0.2 pp
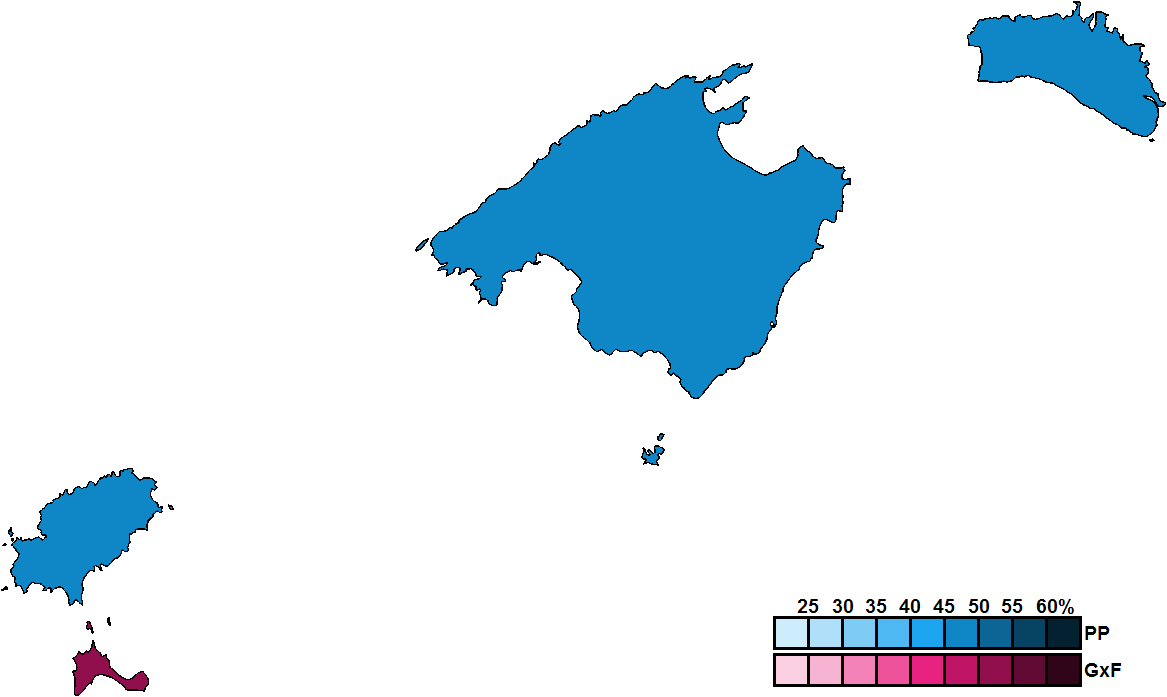
- Constituency results map for the Parliament of the Balearic Islands
President before election
Francesc Antich
PSOE
President after election
José Ramón Bauzá
PP

A regional election was held in the Balearic Islands on 22 May 2011 to elect the 8th Parliament of the autonomous community. All 59 seats in the Parliament were up for election. It was held concurrently with regional elections in twelve other autonomous communities and local elections all across Spain.

Political control of the islands had fluctuated in the preceding elections with the People's Party (PP) losing their majority and consequently, control to a coalition headed by the Socialist Party of the Balearic Islands (PSIB–PSOE) at the 2007 election. The 2011 election saw the PP regain their overall majority. The gains came largely at the expense of United Left, Convergence for the Isles (a successor to the late Majorcan Union), Republican Left and The Greens, all of whom lost their representation in this legislature. These parties had all won seats as part of various coalitions in the previous elections.

One of the first tasks of the Parliament was to elect the president of the Balearic Islands from among their number, with José Ramón Bauzá replacing Francesc Antich (1999–2003, and again 2007–2011) in the post.

== Overview ==
Under the 2007 Statute of Autonomy, the Parliament of the Balearic Islands was the unicameral legislature of the homonymous autonomous community, having legislative power in devolved matters, as well as the ability to grant or withdraw confidence from a regional president. The electoral and procedural rules were supplemented by national law provisions.

=== Date ===
The term of the Parliament of the Balearic Islands expired four years after the date of its previous election, unless it was dissolved earlier. The election decree was required to be issued no later than 25 days before the scheduled expiration date of parliament and published on the following day in the Official Gazette of the Balearic Islands (BOIB), with election day taking place 54 days after the decree's publication. The previous election was held on 27 May 2007, which meant that the chamber's term would have expired on 27 May 2011. The election decree was required to be published in the BOIB no later than 3 May 2011, setting the latest possible date for election day on 26 June 2011.

The regional president had the prerogative to dissolve the Parliament of the Balearic Islands at any given time and call a snap election, provided that no motion of no confidence was in process and that dissolution did not occur before one year after a previous one under this procedure. In the event of an investiture process failing to elect a regional president within a 60-day period from the first ballot, the Parliament was to be automatically dissolved and a fresh election called.

The Parliament of the Balearic Islands was officially dissolved on 29 March 2011 with the publication of the corresponding decree in the BOIB, setting election day for 22 May.

=== Electoral system ===
Voting for the Parliament was based on universal suffrage, comprising all Spanish nationals over 18 years of age, registered in the Balearic Islands and with full political rights, provided that they had not been deprived of the right to vote by a final sentence, nor were legally incapacitated. Amendments earlier in 2011 required non-resident citizens to apply for voting, a system known as "begged" voting (Spanish: Voto rogado).

The Parliament of the Balearic Islands had 59 seats. All were elected in four multi-member constituencies—corresponding to the islands of Mallorca, Menorca, Ibiza and Formentera, each of which was assigned a fixed number of seats—using the D'Hondt method and closed-list proportional voting, with a five percent-threshold of valid votes (including blank ballots) in each constituency. The use of this electoral method resulted in a higher effective threshold depending on district magnitude and vote distribution.

As a result of the aforementioned allocation, each Parliament constituency was entitled the following seats:

Seats	Constituencies
33	Mallorca
13	Menorca
12	Ibiza
1	Formentera

The law did not provide for by-elections to fill vacant seats; instead, any vacancies arising after the proclamation of candidates and during the legislative term were filled by the next candidates on the party lists or, when required, by designated substitutes.

=== Outgoing parliament ===
The table below shows the composition of the parliamentary groups in the chamber at the time of dissolution.

Parliamentary composition in March 2011
Groups	Parties	Legislators	
Groups	Parties	Seats	Total
People's Parliamentary Group	PP	28	28
Socialist Parliamentary Group	PSIB–PSOE	20	20
Bloc for Mallorca–PSM–Greens; Parliamentary Group	PSM	2	5
Bloc for Mallorca–PSM–Greens; Parliamentary Group	EUIB	1	5
Bloc for Mallorca–PSM–Greens; Parliamentary Group	IV	1	5
Bloc for Mallorca–PSM–Greens; Parliamentary Group	PSMe	1	5
Mixed Parliamentary Group	CxI	2	6
Mixed Parliamentary Group	EUIB	1	6
Mixed Parliamentary Group	ERC	1	6
Mixed Parliamentary Group	AIPF	1	6
Mixed Parliamentary Group	INDEP	1 (Note: Bartomeu Vicens, former UM legislator.)	6

== Parties and candidates ==
The electoral law allowed for parties and federations registered in the interior ministry, alliances and groupings of electors to present lists of candidates. Parties and federations intending to form an alliance were required to inform the relevant electoral commission within 10 days of the election call, whereas groupings of electors needed to secure the signature of at least one percent of the electorate in the constituencies for which they sought election, disallowing electors from signing for more than one list. Additionally, a balanced composition of men and women was required in the electoral lists, so that candidates of either sex made up at least 40 percent of the total composition.

Below is a list of the main parties and alliances which contested the election:

Candidacy	Parties and alliances	Leading candidate	Ideology	Previous result		Gov.	Ref.
Candidacy	Parties and alliances	Leading candidate	Ideology	Vote %	Seats	Gov.	Ref.
PP	List: People's Party (PP)	José Ramón Bauzá	Conservatism; Christian democracy	46.0%	28	No	
PSIB–PSOE	List: Socialist Party of the Balearic Islands (PSIB–PSOE)	Francesc Antich	Social democracy	27.6%	16	Yes	
PSM–IV–ExM	List: Socialist Party of Mallorca (PSM); InitiativeGreens (IV); Agreement for Mallorca (ExM)	Biel Barceló	Left-wing nationalism Socialism; Environmentalism	9.4%	4	Yes	
EUIB	List: United Left of the Balearic Islands (EUIB); Left of Menorca–United Left (EM–EU)	Manel Carmona	Socialism; Communism	9.4%	4	Yes	
PSOE–PxE	List: Socialist Party of the Balearic Islands (PSIB–PSOE) (Note: In Ibiza.); Pact for Ibiza (PxE) – People for Ibiza (GxE) – Republican Left of Catalonia (ERC)	Xico Tarrés	Social democracy Progressivism	4.6%	6	Yes	
ExC	List: United Left of Ibiza (IU); The Greens of Ibiza (EV–Eiv)	Miquel Ramon	Socialism; Ecologism	4.6%	6	Yes	
CxI	List: Convergence for the Isles (CxI)	Josep Melià	Regionalism; Liberalism	6.7% (Note: Results for UM in the 2007 election.)	3	No	
PSM–EN	List: Socialist Party of Menorca (PSM)	Nel Martí	Left-wing nationalism Democratic socialism Environmentalism	0.8%	1	No	
Sa Unió	List: People's Party (PP) (Note: In Formentera.); Independent Group of Formentera (GUIF)	Juanma Costa	Conservatism	0.4% (Note: Results for AIPF in the 2007 election.)	1	No	
GxF	List: People for Formentera (GxF); Socialist Party of the Balearic Islands (PSIB–PSOE); United Left of the Balearic Islands (EUIB)	Jaume Ferrer	Environmentalism; Democratic socialism	0.3%	0	No	

== Campaign ==
=== Debates ===
2011 Balearic regional election debates
Date	Organizer(s)	Moderator(s)	P Present (Note: Denotes a main invitee attending the event.)			
Date	Organizer(s)	Moderator(s)	PP	PSIB	Audience	Ref.
15 May	IB3	Cristina Bugallo	P Bauzá	P Antich	7.8% (35,000)	

== Opinion polls ==
The tables below list opinion polling results in reverse chronological order, showing the most recent first and using the dates when the survey fieldwork was done, as opposed to the date of publication. Where the fieldwork dates are unknown, the date of publication is given instead. The highest percentage figure in each polling survey is displayed with its background shaded in the leading party's colour. If a tie ensues, this is applied to the figures with the highest percentages. The "Lead" column on the right shows the percentage-point difference between the parties with the highest percentages in a poll.

=== Voting intention estimates ===
The table below lists weighted voting intention estimates. Refusals are generally excluded from the party vote percentages, while question wording and the treatment of "don't know" responses and those not intending to vote may vary between polling organisations. When available, seat projections determined by the polling organisations are displayed below (or in place of) the percentages in a smaller font; 30 seats were required for an absolute majority in the Parliament of the Balearic Islands.

Polling firm/Commissioner	Fieldwork date	Sample size	Turnout	PP	PSIB–PSOE	PSM	UM	ExC	PSMe	Sa Unió	EUIB	GxF	UIB	UPyD	CxI	Lliga	PxE	Lead
2011 regional election	22 May 2011	—N/a	58.8	46.4; 35	21.4; 14	8.7; 4	–	0.5; 0	0.9; 1	0.3; 0	2.3; 0	0.5; 1	–	2.1; 0	2.8; 0	2.9; 0	3.0; 4	22.0
Sigma Dos/El Mundo	9–11 May 2011	850	?	49.7; 33/35	31.4; 20/22	8.7; 4	–	–	(Note: Within PSM–EN.)	(Note: Within PP.)	–	(Note: Within PSIB–PSOE.)	–	–	2.1; 0	–		18.3
NC Report/La Razón (Note: "El PP doblega al PSOE a siete días de la cita electoral". La Razón (in Spanish). 15 May 2011. Archived from the original on 3 September 2011.)	3–10 May 2011	?	?	48.7; 32/34	30.9; 20/21	? 3/4	–	–			–		–	–	? 0/2	–		17.8
IBES/Última Hora	26 Apr–10 May 2011	1,800	?	48.0; 31/32	27.0; 16/18	5.0; 2/4	–	0.5; 0	1.0; 0/1	? 0/1	3.0; 0	? 0/1	–	2.0; 0/1	2.0; 0/1	2.0; 0/1	4.0; 5	17.0
Ikerfel/Vocento	9 May 2011	?	?	51.4; 31/32	31.7; 24/25	5.8; 2	–	–			5.5; 2/3		–	–	–	–		19.7
TNS Demoscopia/Antena 3	4–5 May 2011	900	?	49.4; 32/34	30.3; 20/22	8.6; 4/5	–	–			–		–	–	3.1; 0	–		19.1
Gadeso	1 May 2011	1,300	?	41.0– 44.0; 30/31	27.0– 29.0; 18	6.0– 8.0; 3	–	0.0– 0.5; 0	0.5– 1.0; 0/1	? 0	3.0– 4.0; 0	? 1	–	1.0– 2.0; 0	2.0– 3.0; 0	2.0– 3.0; 0	4.0– 5.0; 6	14.0– 15.0
NC Report/La Razón	25 Apr 2011	?	?	49.1; 31/33	31.2 ?	–	–	–	–		–		–	–	–	–		17.9
Celeste-Tel/Terra	13–20 Apr 2011	500	?	46.9; 33	35.1; 20	9.8; 6	–	–			–		–	–	2.8; 0	–		11.8
CIS	17 Mar–17 Apr 2011	1,194	?	47.9; 32/33	30.4; 22/23	6.0; 3	–	–			4.5; 1		–	1.1; 0	1.7; 0	–		17.5
Sigma Dos/El Mundo	11–14 Apr 2011	1,000	?	49.3; 33/34	30.0; 19/21	9.0; 4	–	–	? 1		–		–	–	3.2; 0/1	–		19.3
IBES/Última Hora	21–30 Mar 2011	1,800	?	48.0; 30/31	33.0; 23	6.0; 3	–	0.5; 0	1.0; 0/1	? 0	2.0; 0	? 1	–	2.0; 0	4.0; 1	2.0; 0	–	15.0
IBES/Última Hora	13 Feb 2011	?	?	47.0; 30	33.0; 25	6.0; 2	4.0; 1	0.5; 0	0.5; 0	? 0	2.0; 0	? 1	–	2.0; 0	–	–	–	14.0
Sigma Dos/El Mundo	17–21 Dec 2010	650	?	54.6; 35/37	27.4; 17/19	6.7; 3	3.3; 0/1	–	0.8; 1		–		–	–	–	–	–	27.2
IBES/Última Hora	1–13 Dec 2010	2,000	?	46.0; 29	35.0; 25	6.0; 2	4.0; 1	0.5; 0	1.0; 1	? 0	1.0; 0	? 1	–	2.0; 0	–	–	–	11.0
IBES/Última Hora	22 Aug–3 Sep 2010	1,700	?	46.0; 29	36.0; 24	6.0; 3	4.0; 1	0.5; 0	1.0; 1	? 1	2.0; 0	? 0	–	2.0; 0	–	–	–	10.0
Sigma Dos/El Mundo	19–21 May 2010	650	?	49.6; 32/36	33.3; 21/24	5.7; 2	2.9; 0	–	0.7; 1		–		–	3.0; 0	–	–	–	16.3
IBES/Última Hora	2 May 2010	?	?	43.0; 26/27	? 17/18	7.0; 4	–	? 5/6	–	–	–	–	–	–	–	–	–	?
Gadeso	2 May 2010	1,300	?	40.0– 41.0; 28/31	28.0– 29.0; 18/20	4.5– 5.5; 2/3	3.0– 4.0; 0/2	4.5– 5.0; 5/6	0.5– 1.0; 1		–		–	–	–	–	–	12.0
Gadeso	7 Feb 2010	1,300	?	40.0– 41.0; 28/29	28.0– 29.0; 18/19	4.5– 5.5; 2/3	4.5; 2	4.5– 5.0; 5/6	0.5– 1.0; 1		–		–	–	–	–	–	12.0
Gadeso	15–25 Sep 2009	1,300	?	42.0– 43.0; 27/28	28.0– 29.0; 18/19	5.5– 6.5; 2/3	5.5– 6.0; 2/3	4.5– 5.0; 6	0.5– 1.0; 1		0.5– 1.0; 0		–	1.0– 1.5; 0	–	–	–	14.0
MGA Estudios/El Día de Baleares	21 Sep 2009	?	?	44.2	30.1	7.7	4.2	–	–	–	–	–	–	2.9	–	–	–	14.1
2009 EP election	7 Jun 2009	—N/a	37.6	43.7 (31)	38.7 (28)	–	3.8 (0)	–	–	–	2.6 (0)	–	–	2.8 (0)	–	–	–	5.0
Gadeso	1–10 Jan 2009	1,300	?	42.0– 43.0; 26/27	30.0– 31.0; 20	6.5– 7.5; 3	5.5– 6.0; 2/3	5.0– 5.5; 6	0.5– 1.0; 1		0.5– 1.0; 0		–	1.0– 1.5; 0	–	–	–	12.0
IBES/Última Hora	26 Oct 2008	?	53.9	? 25/26	? 19	8.0 ?	6.5 ?	5.1 ?	–	–	–	–	–	–	–	–	–	?
IBES/Última Hora	25 May 2008	?	?	? 27	? 17	–	6.5; 3/4	–	–	–	–	–	–	–	–	–	–	?
2008 general election	9 Mar 2008	—N/a	67.6	44.0	44.2	(Note: Within UIB.)		–		–	2.8	–	5.4	0.7	–	–	–	0.2
2007 regional election	27 May 2007	—N/a	60.1	46.0; 28	27.6; 16	9.0; 4	6.7; 3	4.6; 6	0.8; 1	0.4 (Note: Results for AIPF.); 1	0.4; 0	0.3; 0	–	–	–	–	–	18.4

== Results ==
=== Overall ===
← Summary of the 22 May 2011 Parliament of the Balearic Islands election results →
Parties and alliances	Popular vote			Seats	
Parties and alliances	Votes	%	±pp	Total	+/−
People's Party (PP)	194,861	46.36	+0.34	35	+7
Socialist Party of the Balearic Islands (PSIB–PSOE)	90,008	21.41	−6.19	14	−2
PSM–Initiative Greens–Agreement (PSM–IV–ExM)^{2}	36,181	8.61	n/a	4	+1
PSOE–Pact for Ibiza (PSOE–PxE)^{1}	12,716	3.03	n/a	4	−1
Regionalist League of the Balearic Islands (IB–Lliga)	12,294	2.92	New	0	±0
Convergence for the Isles (CxI)^{3}	11,913	2.83	−3.90	0	−3
United Left of the Balearic Islands (EUIB)	11,209	2.67	n/a	0	−1
United Left of the Balearic Islands (EUIB)^{2}	9,642	2.29	n/a	0	−1
Left of Menorca–United Left (EM–EU)	1,567	0.37	−0.04	0	±0
Union, Progress and Democracy (UPyD)	8,731	2.08	New	0	±0
Republican Left (esquerra)^{2}	5,325	1.27	n/a	0	±0
Socialist Party of Menorca–Nationalist Agreement (PSM–EN)	3,723	0.89	+0.10	1	±0
Citizens for Blank Votes (CenB)	3,163	0.75	+0.46	0	±0
Ibiza for Change (ExC)^{1}	2,061	0.49	n/a	0	−1
People for Formentera+PSOE (GxF+PSOE)	1,904	0.45	+0.10	1	+1
New Alternative (Nov–A)	1,755	0.42	New	0	±0
Anti-Bullfighting Party Against Mistreatment of Animals (PACMA)	1,658	0.39	New	0	±0
The Union of Formentera (PP–GUIF) (Sa Unió)^{4}	1,353	0.32	−0.11	0	−1
Independent Social Group (ASI)	1,094	0.26	−0.20	0	±0
Menorcan Union (UMe)^{5}	968	0.23	+0.07	0	±0
Sustainable Ibiza (ESOS)	908	0.22	New	0	±0
Citizens–Party of the Citizenry (C's)	829	0.20	New	0	±0
The Greens of Menorca (EV–Me)	645	0.15	New	0	±0
Citizens of Democratic Centre (CCD)	621	0.15	New	0	±0
Nationalist and Ecologist Agreement (ENE)^{1}	568	0.14	n/a	0	±0
Workers for Democracy Coalition (TD)	567	0.13	±0.00	0	±0
Spanish Liberal Project (PLIE)	548	0.13	New	0	±0
Ciutadella de Menorca People's Union (UPCM)	509	0.12	New	0	±0
Dissidents (Dissidents)	478	0.11	New	0	±0
Family and Life Party (PFyV)	449	0.11	New	0	±0
Republican Social Movement (MSR)	298	0.07	New	0	±0
Islander Party of the Balearic Islands (PIIB)	282	0.07	−0.02	0	±0
Balearic Radical Party (PRB)	207	0.05	New	0	±0
Renewal Party of Ibiza and Formentera (PREF)	135	0.03	New	0	±0
Communist Unification of Spain (UCE)	64	0.02	New	0	±0
Blank ballots	12,293	2.92	+0.86		
Total	420,318			59	±0
Valid votes	420,318	98.41	−1.00		
Invalid votes	6,775	1.59	+1.00		
Votes cast / turnout	427,093	58.80	−1.34		
Abstentions	299,194	41.20	+1.34		
Registered voters	726,287				
Sources
Footnotes: ^{1} Within the PSOE–Ibiza for Change alliance in the 2007 election.; ^{2} Within the Bloc for Mallorca alliance in the 2007 election.; ^{3} Convergence for the Isles results are compared to Majorcan Union totals in the 2007 election.; ^{4} The Union of Formentera results are compared to Independent Popular Council of Formentera totals in the 2007 election.; ^{5} Menorcan Union results are compared to Union of Centrists of Menorca totals in the 2007 election.

Popular vote
PP	46.36%
PSIB–PSOE	21.41%
PSM–IV–ExM	8.61%
PSOE–PxE	3.03%
IB–Lliga	2.92%
CxI	2.83%
EUIB	2.67%
UPyD	2.08%
esquerra	1.27%
PSM–EN	0.89%
GxF+PSOE	0.45%
Others	4.56%
Blank ballots	2.92%

Seats
PP	59.32%
PSIB–PSOE	23.73%
PSM–IV–ExM	6.78%
PSOE–PxE	6.78%
PSM–EN	1.69%
GxF+PSOE	1.69%

=== Distribution by constituency ===
Constituency	PP		PSIB		PSM–IV		PSOE–PxE		PSM–EN		GxF	
Constituency	%	S	%	S	%	S	%	S	%	S	%	S
Formentera											54.0	1
Ibiza	49.8	8					30.6	4				
Mallorca	46.5	19	23.6	10	10.7	4						
Menorca	46.1	8	27.1	4					9.8	1		
Total	46.4	35	21.4	14	8.6	4	3.0	4	0.9	1	0.5	1

== Aftermath ==
=== Government formation ===
Investiture; Nomination of José Ramón Bauzá (PP)
Ballot →	15 June 2011
Required majority →	30 out of 59
Yes: • PP (35)	35 / 59
No: • PSIB (19); • PSM–IV (5)	24 / 59
Abstentions	0 / 59
Absentees	0 / 59

== Bibliography ==
- Ley Orgánica 5/1985, de 19 de junio, del Régimen Electoral General (Organic Law 5/1985). Official State Gazette (in Spanish). 19 June 1985 [version as of 30 April 2011]. BOE-A-1985-11672.
- Ley 8/1986, de 26 de noviembre, Electoral de la Comunidad Autónoma de las Islas Baleares (Law 8/1986). Official State Gazette (in Spanish). 26 November 1986 [version as of 3 November 2006]. BOE-A-1987-2903.
- Ley 4/2001, de 14 de marzo, del Gobierno de las Illes Balears (Law 4/2001). Official State Gazette (in Spanish). 14 March 2001 [version as of 9 April 2011]. BOE-A-2001-7026.
- Ley Orgánica 1/2007, de 28 de febrero, de reforma del Estatuto de Autonomía de las Illes Balears (Organic Law 1/2007). Official State Gazette (in Spanish). 28 February 2007 [version as of 17 July 2010]. BOE-A-2007-4233.
- Decreto 3/2011, de 28 de marzo, del Presidente de las Illes Balears, de disolución y convocatoria de elecciones al Parlamento de las Illes Balears (PDF) (Decree 3/2011). Official Gazette of the Balearic Islands (in Spanish). 28 March 2011.
