= 2011 Spanish regional elections =

- 22 May 2011

824 seats in the regional parliaments of Aragon, Asturias, Balearic Islands, Canary Islands, Cantabria, Castile and León, Castilla–La Mancha, Extremadura, La Rioja, Madrid, Murcia, Navarre and Valencian Community
Regional administrations by leading party in 2011
National parties
PP (11+2)
PSOE (2)
Regional parties
CiU (1)
CC (1)
FAC (1)
UPN (1)

Regional elections were held in Spain during 2011 to elect the regional parliaments of thirteen of the seventeen autonomous communities: Aragon, Asturias, the Balearic Islands, the Canary Islands, Cantabria, Castile and León, Castilla–La Mancha, Extremadura, La Rioja, Madrid, Murcia, Navarre and the Valencian Community. 824 of 1,218 seats in the regional parliaments were up for election. The elections were held on 22 May (concurrently with local elections all across the country).

The week before the elections came dominated under the scope of the 15-M protests which had been held in different cities across Spain. The opposition People's Party (PP) won the elections in a landslide as the ruling Spanish Socialist Workers' Party (PSOE) lost all regional governments at stake—including Extremadura and Castilla–La Mancha, which it had held since 1983. The PP won outright majorities in eight out of the thirteen communities holding elections, and was able to gain power in a further two either through agreements with other parties.

== Election date ==
Determination of election day varied depending on the autonomous community. Typically, most autonomous communities held their elections on the fourth Sunday of May every four years, concurrently with nationwide local elections, while others had their own, separate electoral cycles. In some cases, regional presidents had the prerogative to dissolve parliament and call for extra elections at a different time, but newly elected assemblies were restricted to serving out what remained of their previous four year-terms without altering the period to their next ordinary election. In other cases—Andalusia (since 1994), Aragon (2007), the Balearic Islands (2007), the Basque Country (1981), Castile and León (2007), Catalonia (1985), Extremadura (2011), Galicia (1985), Navarre (2010) and the Valencian Community (2006)—the law granted regional presidents the power to call snap elections resulting in fresh four-year parliamentary terms.

== Regional governments ==
The following table lists party control in autonomous communities. Gains for a party are highlighted in that party's colour.

Election day	Region	Previous control	New control
22 May	Aragon	Spanish Socialist Workers' Party (PSOE)	People's Party (PP)
22 May	Asturias	Spanish Socialist Workers' Party (PSOE)	Asturias Forum (FAC)
22 May	Balearic Islands	Spanish Socialist Workers' Party (PSOE)	People's Party (PP)
22 May	Canary Islands	Canarian Coalition (CC)	Canarian Coalition (CC)
22 May	Cantabria	Regionalist Party of Cantabria (PRC)	People's Party (PP)
22 May	Castile and León	People's Party (PP)	People's Party (PP)
22 May	Castilla–La Mancha	Spanish Socialist Workers' Party (PSOE)	People's Party (PP)
22 May	Extremadura	Spanish Socialist Workers' Party (PSOE)	People's Party (PP)
22 May	La Rioja	People's Party (PP)	People's Party (PP)
22 May	Madrid	People's Party (PP)	People's Party (PP)
22 May	Murcia	People's Party (PP)	People's Party (PP)
22 May	Navarre	Navarrese People's Union (UPN)	Navarrese People's Union (UPN)
22 May	Valencian Community	People's Party (PP)	People's Party (PP)

== Summary by region ==
=== May (13 regions) ===
==== Aragon ====
Parties and alliances	Votes	%	±pp	Seats	+/−
PP	269,729	39.69	+8.63	30	+7
PSOE	197,189	29.02	−12.12	22	−8
PAR	62,193	9.15	−2.93	7	−2
CHA	55,932	8.23	+0.08	4	±0
IU	41,874	6.16	+2.08	4	+3
UPyD	15,667	2.31	New	0	±0
Others	15,267	2.25		0	±0
Blank ballots	21,678	3.19	+0.97		
Valid votes	679,529	98.50	−0.81		
Invalid votes	10,375	1.50	+0.81		
Votes cast / turnout	689,904	67.90	+1.39		
Registered voters	1,016,021				

==== Asturias ====
Parties and alliances	Votes	%	±pp	Seats	+/−
PSOE	179,619	29.92	−12.12	15	−6
FAC	178,031	29.66	New	16	+16
PP	119,767	19.95	−21.55	10	−10
IU–LV	61,703	10.28	+0.59	4	±0
UPyD	14,640	2.44	New	0	±0
IDEAS	6,380	1.06	New	0	±0
BA–UNA: CxA	6,191	1.03	New	0	±0
Others	18,332	3.05		0	±0
Blank ballots	15,611	2.60	+0.19		
Valid votes	600,274	98.56	−0.64		
Invalid votes	8,798	1.44	+0.64		
Votes cast / turnout	609,072	61.69	+0.10		
Registered voters	987,305				

==== Balearic Islands ====
Parties and alliances	Votes	%	±pp	Seats	+/−
PP	194,861	46.36	+0.34	35	+7
PSIB–PSOE	102,724	24.44	−7.72	18	−3
PSM–IV–ExM	36,181	8.61	n/a	4	+1
EUIB	13,270	3.15	n/a	0	−2
IB–Lliga	12,294	2.92	New	0	±0
CxI	11,913	2.83	−3.90	0	−3
UPyD	8,731	2.08	New	0	±0
esquerra	5,325	1.27	n/a	0	±0
PSM–EN	3,723	0.89	+0.10	1	±0
GxF+PSOE	1,904	0.45	+0.10	1	+1
Sa Unió	1,353	0.32	−0.11	0	−1
Others	15,756	3.75		0	±0
Blank ballots	12,293	2.92	+0.86		
Valid votes	420,318	98.41	−1.00		
Invalid votes	6,775	1.59	+1.00		
Votes cast / turnout	427,093	58.80	−1.34		
Registered voters	726,287				

==== Canary Islands ====
Parties and alliances	Votes	%	±pp	Seats	+/−
PP	289,381	31.94	+7.90	21	+6
CC–PNC–CCN	225,948	24.94	−3.16	21	+2
PSOE	190,028	20.98	−13.53	15	−11
NC	82,148	9.07	+2.60	3	+3
ACSSP	19,020	2.10	+1.58	0	±0
LV	18,831	2.08	+0.18	0	±0
UPyD	9,069	1.00	New	0	±0
Others	46,517	5.13		0	±0
Blank ballots	25,017	2.76	+1.34		
Valid votes	905,959	97.31	−2.12		
Invalid votes	25,051	2.69	+2.12		
Votes cast / turnout	931,010	58.90	−1.54		
Registered voters	1,580,700				

==== Cantabria ====
Parties and alliances	Votes	%	±pp	Seats	+/−
PP	156,499	46.09	+4.61	20	+3
PRC	98,887	29.12	+0.48	12	±0
PSOE	55,541	16.36	−8.18	7	−3
IU–IA	11,277	3.32	+1.44	0	±0
UPyD	5,835	1.72	New	0	±0
Others	4,185	1.23		0	±0
Blank ballots	7,328	2.16	+0.45		
Valid votes	339,552	98.30	−0.76		
InValid votes	5,887	1.70	+0.76		
Votes cast / turnout	345,439	69.79	−2.18		
Registered voters	494,955				

==== Castile and León ====
Parties and alliances	Votes	%	±pp	Seats	+/−
PP	739,502	51.55	+2.38	53	+5
PSOE	425,777	29.68	−8.05	29	−4
IUCyL	69,872	4.87	+1.79	1	+1
UPyD	47,040	3.28	New	0	±0
UPL	26,660	1.86	−0.87	1	−1
Others	78,553	5.48		0	±0
Blank ballots	47,008	3.28	+1.30		
Valid votes	1,434,412	98.09	−1.11		
Invalid votes	27,985	1.91	+1.11		
Votes cast / turnout	1,462,397	67.50	−3.20		
Registered voters	2,166,385				

==== Castilla–La Mancha ====
Parties and alliances	Votes	%	±pp	Seats	+/−
PP	564,954	48.11	+5.73	25	+4
PSOE	509,738	43.40	−8.56	24	−2
IUCLM	44,302	3.77	+0.35	0	±0
UPyD	20,554	1.75	New	0	±0
Others	15,225	1.30		0	±0
Blank ballots	19,643	1.67	+0.39		
Valid votes	1,174,416	98.69	−0.56		
Invalid votes	15,570	1.31	+0.56		
Votes cast / turnout	1,189,986	75.96	+2.22		
Registered voters	1,566,641				

==== Extremadura ====
Parties and alliances	Votes	%	±pp	Seats	+/−
PP–EU	307,975	46.13	+7.42	32	+5
PSOE–r	290,045	43.45	−9.55	30	−8
IU–SIEx	38,157	5.72	+1.20	3	+3
UPyD	7,058	1.06	New	0	±0
Others	14,970	2.24		0	±0
Blank ballots	9,394	1.41	+0.22		
Valid votes	667,599	98.65	−0.62		
Invalid votes	9,169	1.35	+0.62		
Votes cast / turnout	676,768	74.65	−0.30		
Registered voters	906,551				

==== La Rioja ====
Parties and alliances	Votes	%	±pp	Seats	+/−
PP	85,975	51.98	+3.17	20	+3
PSOE	50,169	30.33	−10.08	11	−3
PR	8,983	5.43	−0.57	2	±0
IU	6,114	3.70	+0.64	0	±0
UPyD	5,891	3.56	New	0	±0
Ecolo–V	2,041	1.23	New	0	±0
Others	1,746	1.06		0	±0
Blank ballots	4,496	2.72	+1.00		
Valid votes	165,415	97.98	−1.23		
InValid votes	3,411	2.02	+1.23		
Votes cast / turnout	168,826	69.76	−3.54		
Registered voters	242,007				

==== Madrid ====
Parties and alliances	Votes	%	±pp	Seats	+/−
PP	1,548,306	51.73	−1.56	72	+5
PSOE	786,297	26.27	−7.30	36	−6
IUCM–LV	287,707	9.61	+0.75	13	+2
UPyD	189,055	6.32	New	8	+8
Others	110,413	3.69		0	±0
Blank ballots	71,458	2.39	+0.66		
Valid votes	2,993,235	98.32	−1.23		
Invalid votes	51,114	1.68	+1.23		
Votes cast / turnout	3,044,349	65.86	−1.45		
Registered voters	4,622,750				

==== Murcia ====
Parties and alliances	Votes	%	±pp	Seats	+/−
PP	382,871	58.79	+0.49	33	+4
PSOE	155,506	23.88	−8.12	11	−4
IU–V–RM	50,988	7.83	+1.58	1	±0
UPyD	29,279	4.50	New	0	±0
LV–Ecolo	7,659	1.18	New	0	±0
Others	10,908	1.67		0	±0
Blank ballots	14,050	2.16	+0.83		
Valid votes	651,261	98.37	−0.87		
Invalid votes	10,825	1.63	+0.87		
Votes cast / turnout	662,086	67.91	−0.10		
Registered voters	974,998				

==== Navarre ====
Parties and alliances	Votes	%	±pp	Seats	+/−
UPN	111,474	34.48	−7.70	19	−3
PSN–PSOE	51,238	15.85	−6.64	9	−3
NaBai 2011	49,827	15.41	−8.21	8	−4
B–EA/AE–EA	42,916	13.28	New	7	+7
PP	23,551	7.29	New	4	+4
I–E	18,457	5.71	+1.36	3	+1
CDN	4,654	1.44	−2.93	0	−2
VN–NB	4,235	1.31	New	0	±0
Others	8,741	2.70		0	±0
Blank ballots	8,161	2.52	+1.14		
Valid votes	323,254	98.77	+4.03		
Invalid votes	4,027	1.23	−4.03		
Votes cast / turnout	327,281	67.43	−6.36		
Registered voters	485,386				

==== Valencian Community ====
Parties and alliances	Votes	%	±pp	Seats	+/−
PP	1,211,112	49.42	−3.10	55	+1
PSPV–PSOE	687,141	28.04	−6.45	33	−5
Compromís	176,213	7.19	n/a	6	+4
EUPV	144,703	5.90	n/a	5	±0
UPyD	60,859	2.48	New	0	±0
VyE	31,808	1.30	New	0	±0
Others	78,366	3.20		0	±0
Blank ballots	60,670	2.48	+1.07		
Valid votes	2,450,872	98.37	−0.96		
Invalid votes	40,716	1.63	+0.96		
Votes cast / turnout	2,491,588	70.19	+0.05		
Registered voters	3,549,687				

== Bibliography ==
- Ley Orgánica 5/1985, de 19 de junio, del Régimen Electoral General (Organic Law 5/1985). Official State Gazette (in Spanish). 19 June 1985 [version as of 30 April 2011]. BOE-A-1985-11672.
