= 2007 Spanish local elections in the Balearic Islands =

This article presents the results breakdown of the local elections held in the Balearic Islands on 27 May 2007. The following tables show detailed results in the autonomous community's most populous municipalities, sorted alphabetically.

== Opinion polls ==
=== Ibiza polling ===
Polling firm/Commissioner	Fieldwork date	Sample size	Turnout	Pacte	PP	EV	PSOE–ExC	Lead
2007 municipal election	27 May 2007	—N/a	52.9	(Note: Within ExC.)	41.3; 9		52.5; 12	11.2
Infortécnica	Jan–Feb 2007	531	?	51.6; 9/11	48.4; 10/12	–	–	3.2
2003 municipal election	25 May 2003	—N/a	55.0	44.2; 11	42.6; 10	3.0; 0	–	1.6

== City control ==
The following table lists party control in the most populous municipalities, including provincial capitals (shown in bold). Gains for a party are displayed with the cell's background shaded in that party's colour.

Municipality	Population	Previous control	New control
Ciutadella de Menorca	27,468	People's Party (PP)	People's Party (PP) (PSIB–PSOE in 2009)
Ibiza	42,884	Socialist Party of the Balearic Islands (PSIB–PSOE)	Socialist Party of the Balearic Islands (PSIB–PSOE)
Inca	27,301	People's Party (PP)	People's Party (PP)
Manacor	37,165	People's Party (PP)	People's Party (PP)
Maó-Mahón	27,893	Socialist Party of the Balearic Islands (PSIB–PSOE)	Socialist Party of the Balearic Islands (PSIB–PSOE)
**Palma de Mallorca**	375,048	People's Party (PP)	Socialist Party of the Balearic Islands (PSIB–PSOE)
Santa Eulària des Riu	27,152	People's Party (PP)	People's Party (PP)

== Municipalities ==
=== Ciutadella de Menorca ===
Population: 27,468

← Summary of the 27 May 2007 City Council of Ciutadella de Menorca election results →
Parties and alliances	Popular vote			Seats	
Parties and alliances	Votes	%	±pp	Total	+/−
People's Party (PP)	4,583	39.46	−1.71	10	±0
Socialist Party of the Balearic Islands (PSIB–PSOE)	3,093	26.63	+2.33	6	±0
PSM–Nationalist Agreement (PSM–EN)	1,769	15.23	+3.43	4	+2
Ciutadella de Menorca People's Union (UPCM)	604	5.20	New	1	+1
Menorcan Party (PMQ)	478	4.12	−3.60	0	−1
Union of Centrists of Menorca (UCM)	455	3.92	−2.31	0	−1
Left of Menorca–The Greens (EM–EV)	430	3.70	−1.62	0	−1
Blank ballots	202	1.74	−0.09		
Total	11,614			21	±0
Valid votes	11,614	99.48	+0.06		
Invalid votes	61	0.52	−0.06		
Votes cast / turnout	11,675	58.46	−0.18		
Abstentions	8,296	41.54	+0.18		
Registered voters	19,971				

=== Ibiza ===
Population: 42,884

← Summary of the 27 May 2007 City Council of Ibiza election results →
Parties and alliances	Popular vote			Seats	
Parties and alliances	Votes	%	±pp	Total	+/−
PSOE–Ibiza for Change (PSOE–ExC)^{1}	8,100	52.49	+5.23	12	+1
People's Party (PP)	6,376	41.32	−1.24	9	−1
European Green Group (GVE)	334	2.16	+1.33	0	±0
Civic Union (UC)	149	0.97	−1.31	0	±0
National Democracy (DN)	70	0.45	New	0	±0
Blank ballots	402	2.61	+0.32		
Total	15,431			21	±0
Valid votes	15,431	99.45	+0.16		
Invalid votes	86	0.55	−0.16		
Votes cast / turnout	15,517	52.85	−2.18		
Abstentions	13,842	47.15	+2.18		
Registered voters	29,359				
Sources
Footnotes: ^{1} PSOE–Ibiza for Change results are compared to the combined totals of Progressive Pact and The Greens in the 2003 election.

=== Inca ===
Population: 27,301

← Summary of the 27 May 2007 City Council of Inca election results →
Parties and alliances	Popular vote			Seats	
Parties and alliances	Votes	%	±pp	Total	+/−
People's Party (PP)	6,325	51.66	−3.96	12	−1
Socialist Party of the Balearic Islands (PSIB–PSOE)	3,063	25.02	+6.88	6	+2
Bloc for Inca (PSM–EN, EU–EV)^{1}	1,238	10.11	−3.90	2	±0
Independents of Inca (INDI)	908	7.42	+1.72	1	±0
Majorcan Union (UM)	546	4.46	−0.99	0	−1
Blank ballots	163	1.33	+0.25		
Total	12,243			21	±0
Valid votes	12,243	99.59	+0.15		
Invalid votes	51	0.41	−0.15		
Votes cast / turnout	12,294	63.02	−3.75		
Abstentions	7,213	36.98	+3.75		
Registered voters	19,507				
Sources
Footnotes: ^{1} Bloc for Inca results are compared to the combined totals of Socialist Party of Mallorca–Nationalist Agreement and United Left of Majorca–The Greens of Majorca in the 2003 election.

=== Llucmajor ===
Population: 31,381

← Summary of the 27 May 2007 City Council of Llucmajor election results →
Parties and alliances	Popular vote			Seats	
Parties and alliances	Votes	%	±pp	Total	+/−
People's Party (PP)	5,729	43.49	−1.71	10	−1
Socialist Party of the Balearic Islands (PSIB–PSOE)	3,868	29.36	+4.27	7	+1
Bloc for Llucmajor (PSM–EN, EU–EV)^{1}	1,350	10.25	−0.24	2	+1
Independent Social Group (ASI)	988	7.50	−4.53	1	−1
Majorcan Union (UM)	856	6.50	+1.24	1	±0
Spanish Phalanx of the CSNO (FE de las JONS)	97	0.74	New	0	±0
Blank ballots	286	2.17	+1.00		
Total	13,174			21	±0
Valid votes	13,174	99.10	−0.07		
Invalid votes	120	0.90	+0.07		
Votes cast / turnout	13,294	57.51	−6.26		
Abstentions	9,821	42.49	+6.26		
Registered voters	23,115				
Sources
Footnotes: ^{1} Bloc for Llucmajor results are compared to the combined totals of Socialist Party of Mallorca–Nationalist Agreement and United Left–The Greens in the 2003 election.

=== Manacor ===
Population: 37,165

← Summary of the 27 May 2007 City Council of Manacor election results →
Parties and alliances	Popular vote			Seats	
Parties and alliances	Votes	%	±pp	Total	+/−
People's Party (PP)	6,752	43.67	+7.82	10	+1
Liberal Alternative for Manacor–Majorcan Union (ALM–UM)	2,268	14.67	−8.99	3	−3
Socialist Party of Mallorca–Republican Left–Greens (PSM+Esquerra+Verds)^{1}	2,072	13.40	+0.22	3	+1
Socialist Party of the Balearic Islands (PSIB–PSOE)	2,033	13.15	+2.33	3	+1
Independent Group of Porto Cristo (AIPC)	1,415	9.15	−0.47	2	±0
United Left–Manacor Green Initiative (EU–IV)	616	3.98	−0.44	0	±0
Key of Majorca–Porto Cristo Alternative (Clau–AlPort)	84	0.54	−0.57	0	±0
Blank ballots	221	1.43	+0.09		
Total	15,689			21	±0
Valid votes	15,461	99.52	−0.09		
Invalid votes	75	0.48	+0.09		
Votes cast / turnout	15,536	60.11	−2.57		
Abstentions	10,309	39.89	+2.57		
Registered voters	25,845				
Sources
Footnotes: ^{1} Socialist Party of Mallorca–Republican Left–Greens results are compared to the combined totals of Socialist Party of Mallorca–Nationalist Agreement and Republican Left of Catalonia in the 2003 election.

=== Maó-Mahón ===
Population: 27,893

← Summary of the 27 May 2007 City Council of Maó-Mahón election results →
Parties and alliances	Popular vote			Seats	
Parties and alliances	Votes	%	±pp	Total	+/−
Socialist Party of the Balearic Islands (PSIB–PSOE)	4,175	38.22	−3.67	9	−1
People's Party (PP)	4,125	37.76	+1.59	8	±0
PSM–Nationalist Agreement–The Greens of Menorca (PSM–Verds)^{1}	976	8.94	−3.45	2	±0
Left of Menorca–United Left (EM–EU)	708	6.48	+1.15	1	±0
Citizens of Menorca (CMe)	697	6.38	New	1	+1
Blank ballots	242	2.22	+0.70		
Total	10,923			21	±0
Valid votes	10,923	99.41	−0.15		
Invalid votes	65	0.59	+0.15		
Votes cast / turnout	10,988	56.46	−1.75		
Abstentions	8,472	43.54	+1.75		
Registered voters	19,460				
Sources
Footnotes: ^{1} PSM–Nationalist Agreement–The Greens of Menorca results are compared to the combined totals of Socialist Party of Menorca–Nationalist Agreement and The Greens of Menorca in the 2003 election.

=== Palma de Mallorca ===
Population: 375,048

← Summary of the 27 May 2007 City Council of Palma de Mallorca election results →
Parties and alliances	Popular vote			Seats	
Parties and alliances	Votes	%	±pp	Total	+/−
People's Party (PP)	66,150	46.05	−0.01	14	−1
Socialist Party of the Balearic Islands (PSIB–PSOE)	50,862	35.41	+8.30	11	+2
Bloc for Palma (PSM–EN, EU–EV, ERC)^{1}	11,786	8.21	−8.84	2	−3
Majorcan Union (UM)	9,472	6.59	+2.39	2	+2
Independent Social Group (ASI)	676	0.47	−1.58	0	±0
Balearic Party (PB)	499	0.35	New	0	±0
For a Fairer World (PUM+J)	369	0.26	New	0	±0
Spanish Phalanx of the CNSO (FE de las JONS)	358	0.25	New	0	±0
Balearic People's Union (UPB)	315	0.22	New	0	±0
Workers for Democracy Coalition (TD)	265	0.18	+0.01	0	±0
Islander Party of the Balearic Islands (PIIB)	152	0.11	New	0	±0
Blank ballots	2,739	1.91	±0.00		
Total	143,643			29	±0
Valid votes	143,643	99.45	+0.07		
Invalid votes	796	0.55	−0.07		
Votes cast / turnout	144,439	53.17	−3.34		
Abstentions	127,213	46.83	+3.34		
Registered voters	271,652				
Sources
Footnotes: ^{1} Bloc for Palma results are compared to the combined totals of United Left–The Greens, Socialist Party of Mallorca–Nationalist Agreement and Republican Left of Catalonia in the 2003 election.

=== Santa Eulària des Riu ===
Population: 27,152

← Summary of the 27 May 2007 City Council of Santa Eulària des Riu election results →
Parties and alliances	Popular vote			Seats	
Parties and alliances	Votes	%	±pp	Total	+/−
People's Party (PP)	5,898	60.73	+1.73	13	−1
PSOE–Ibiza for Change (PSOE–ExC)^{1}	3,550	36.55	+4.08	8	+1
Blank ballots	264	2.72	+0.67		
Total	9,712			21	±0
Valid votes	9,712	99.05	+0.06		
Invalid votes	93	0.95	−0.06		
Votes cast / turnout	9,805	52.11	−5.65		
Abstentions	9,012	42.24	+5.65		
Registered voters	18,817				
Sources
Footnotes: ^{1} PSOE–Ibiza for Change results are compared to the combined totals of Progressive Pact and The Greens in the 2003 election.

== See also ==
- 2007 Balearic regional election
