= Pacte per Eivissa =

- Founded: 2011
- Dissolved: 2015
- Merger of: Republican Left of Catalonia; Gent per Eivissa; Independents
- Political position: Centre-left to left-wing

Pacte per Eivissa (transl. Pact for Ibiza, PxE) was a political platform formed in Ibiza in 2011. It contested the 2011 Balearic election in coalition with the Socialist Party of the Balearic Islands (PSIB) as an electoral alliance formed by Republican Left of Catalonia (ERC) and People for Ibiza (GxE). GxE obtained one representative for the constituency of Ibiza.

== Electoral performance ==
=== Parliament of the Balearic Islands ===
Date	Votes			Seats		Status	Size
Date	#	%	±pp	#	±	Status	Size
2011	12,716	3.0%	—	1 / 59	—	Opposition	*

- * In coalition with the Socialist Party of the Balearic Islands.

== Member parties ==
- Republican Left of Catalonia (ERC)
- People for Ibiza (GxE)
