= Menorcan Union =

Menorcan Union Unió Menorquina
- Leader: Irene Coll
- Secretary-General: Fèlix Ripoll
- Founded: 23 April 1993; 2009
- Dissolved: 2012
- Merged into: Proposta per les Illes
- Headquarters: C/ Stuart, 129 baixos 07720 Es Castell, Menorca
- Ideology: Centrism; Liberalism; Balearic regionalism
- Colours: Blue; Dark pink
- Local councillors in Menorca (2011–2015): 4 / 114

Menorcan Union (Catalan: Unió Menorquina, UMe; IPA: [uniˈo mənuɾˈkinə]) was a regional liberal party in Menorca. It was registered as a party since 1993. However, until 2009 it did not start its political activity. It gathered people from different municipal parties in Menorca, like Independents for Es Castell (IPEC), Union of Centrists of Menorca (UCM), and Social Action.

UMe joined Majorcan Union (UM) in the Balearic Islands to participate in the 2009 European election with the Coalition for Europe, obtaining 546 votes (2.5%) in Menorca. In the 2011 local election, the formation obtained four local councillors in Menorca.

In 2012, it merged into the new balearic regionalist formation Proposta per les Illes, along with Regionalist League of the Balearic Islands (IB–Lliga), Convergence for the Isles (CxI), and Es Nou Partit.

== Electoral performance ==
=== Parliament of the Balearic Islands ===
Date	Votes			Seats		Status	Size
Date	#	%	±pp	#	±	Status	Size
2011	968	0.2%	+0.1	0 / 59	0	N/A	13th

=== European Parliament ===
Spain
Date	Votes			Seats		Size
Date	#	%	±pp	#	±	Size
2009	808,246	5.1%	—	0 / 54	—	*

Balearic Islands
Date	Votes			Size
Date	#	%	±pp	Size
2009**	9,819	3.8%	—	3rd

- * Within Coalition for Europe.
- ** In coalition with Majorcan Union.
