= Sa Unió de Formentera =

The Union of Formentera Sa Unió de Formentera
- Founded: 2011
- Preceded by: Independent Popular Council of Formentera
- Ideology: Conservatism
- Political position: Centre-right
- Colours
- Congress of Deputies: 0 / 350
- Spanish Senate: 0 / 266
- European Parliament (Spanish seats): 0 / 61
- Parliament of the Balearic Islands (Formentera seat): 1 / 1
- Island Council of Formentera: 9 / 17

Website
- sauniodeformentera.com

Sa Unió de Formentera (English: The Union of Formentera, Sa Unió), is an electoral alliance of the island of Formentera that appeared in 2011 to contest the elections to the Island Council of Formentera and the elections to the Parliament of the Balearic Islands. It is the successor coalition of the Independent Popular Council of Formentera, and its main party is the PP.
