= IniciativaVerds =

- Co-coordinators: Biel Frontera; Neus Truyol
- Founded: 6 November 2010
- Headquarters: Carrer General Riera, 3, 1ºA. 07003 Palma de Mallorca
- Ideology: Eco-socialism; Green politics; Federalism; Republicanism
- Political position: Left-wing
- National affiliation: Equo
- Regional affiliation: Més per Mallorca
- Colours: Green
- Parliament of the Balearic Islands: 1 / 59
- Council of Majorca: 1 / 33

Website
- www.iniciativaverds.org

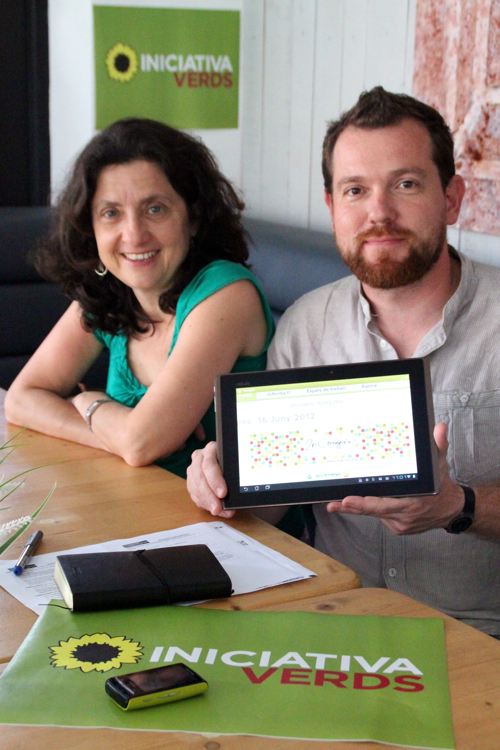
Fina Santiago and David Abril presenting the Android APP of the party.

IniciativaVerds (English: InitiativeGreens, IV) is a Balearic ecosocialist political party. IV is a part of the Més per Mallorca coalition. IV supports Equo at the Spanish level.

IV was founded after Iniciativa d'Esquerres (Left-wing Initiative), a split of United Left of the Balearic Islands (EUIB), and The Greens of Majorca merged in November 2010.
