= Convergence for the Isles =

Convergence for the Isles Convergència per les Illes
- President: Josep Melià Ques
- Secretary general: Antoni Amengual Perelló
- Founded: March 2, 2011
- Dissolved: November 2012
- Merged into: Proposta per les Illes
- Headquarters: Carrer d'Aragó, 22 Palma de Mallorca
- Ideology: Liberalism; Balearic nationalism
- Political position: Centre

Convergence for the Isles (Catalan: Convergència per les Illes) was a Balearic nationalist political party founded in March 2011 and merged into Proposta per les Illes in November 2012. The party's aim was to constitute a third pole in Balearic politics that—unlike the People's Party and the Socialists—would be nationalist and centrist.

== History ==
Convergence emerged from the dissolved Majorcan Union, which had been discredited through numerous allegations of corruption, and pledged to "make a clear and deep break with the past" One of the primary objectives of Convergence was to attain the highest level of self-government for the Balearic Islands through a Statute of Autonomy within the framework of the Spanish Constitution.

At the party's first elections, those at the autonomous community and municipal level in 2011, the party gained representation on 20 city councils in Majorca, a total of 65 municipal councillors and 8 mayors.

In February 2012, the party's founding congress saw the nearly unanimous election of Josep Melià Ques as party president, Antoni Amengual Perelló as secretary general, and their party executive.

In November 2012, Convergence merged with three other Balearic regionalist and nationalist formations—Regionalist League of the Balearic Islands, Menorcan Union and Es Nou Partit—to form Proposta per les Illes.
