= Eivissa pel Canvi =

- Founded: May 2006 (as a platform); January 2007 (as a party)
- Dissolved: 2016
- Merger of: United Left of Ibiza; The Greens; Nationalist and Ecologist Agreement (2006–2010); Republican Left of Catalonia (2006–2010)
- Merged into: Let's Win Ibiza
- Ideology: Socialism; Ecologism
- Political position: Centre-left to left-wing

Eivissa pel Canvi (English: Ibiza for Change, ExC) was a political platform, and later a political party, formed in the island of Ibiza in 2006, to politically support the social movement against the beginning of constructions of new roads and highways the same year. The platform demanded a change in the Island Council and the Balearic governments, which were both controlled by the People's Party with a majority of seats.

== History ==
In 2007 the platform transformed itself into a party, with the aim to contest the Balearic regional election and local elections in May, supported by United Left–The Greens (EU–EV), Nationalist and Ecologist Agreement (ENE), Republican Left of Catalonia (ERC) and independents. Before the elections, the party reached an agreement to form a coalition with the Socialist Party of the Balearic Islands (PSIB–PSOE). The alliance obtained an absolute majority the Island Council of Ibiza election and six out of twelve seats in the constituency of Ibiza for the Balearic Parliament, being important for the second progressive pact for the government of the community.

In 2008, the same PSOE–ExC alliance (named Ibiza and Formentera in the Senate) contested the 2008 Spanish general election in the Ibiza–Formentera constituency for the Senate, winning the only seat.

In 2010, one year before the next regional election, ENE and ERC announce their intention to leave the coalition by the end of the electoral term. However, the coalition was maintained with members of EU and independents, and contested the regional and local elections on its own, winning no seats in either the Parliament of the Balearic Islands or the Island Council.

In 2014, ExC participated in the creation of a left-wing, ecologist political platform, along with ENE and other minor parties, called Process of Citizen Unity (PUC). These parties later formed Let's Win Ibiza (Guanyem) ahead of the May 2015 Balearic regional election and local elections. In the Island Council election, members of Guanyem entered the list of We Can (Podemos).

== Electoral performance ==
=== Parliament of the Balearic Islands ===
Date	Votes			Seats		Status	Size
Date	#	%	±pp	#	±	Status	Size
2007	19,094	4.6%	—	2 / 59	—	Government	*
2011	2,061	0.5%	–4.1	0 / 59	2	N/A	**

- * In coalition with the Socialist Party of the Balearic Islands.
- ** Within United Left of the Balearic Islands.
