= Esquerra de Menorca =

- General Coordinator: Pablo Jiménez
- Ideology: Eurocommunism; Democratic socialism Republicanism; Federalism; Ecosocialism
- Political position: Left-wing
- National affiliation: United Left of the Balearic Islands

Website
- esquerrademenorca.blogspot.com.es

Esquerra de Menorca (English: Left of Menorca), also referred to as Esquerra de Menorca–Esquerra Unida (English: Left of Menorca–United Left), is the Menorca federation of United Left of the Balearic Islands.

United Left in Menorca and the Socialist Party of Menorca (PSM) maintained a stable agreement between 1987 and 1994, called Entesa de l'Esquerra de Menorca (English: Agreement of the Left of Menorca), which obtained two representatives in the Balearic Parliament and the Insular Council of Menorca in the elections of 1987 and 1991, both of the PSM. After the break up of the agreement, they ran alone under the Esquerra de Menorca label in the 1995 election, obtaining a deputy in the Balearic Parliament and in the Council of Menorca. In the following election (1999) they ran in coalition with The Greens of Menorca. This alliance was broken in 2002. Since then, they have contested in autonomous and island elections on their own, without winning any seats.
