= Regionalist League of the Balearic Islands =

Regionalist League of the Balearic Islands Lliga Regionalista de les Illes Balears
- Founded: February 2011
- Dissolved: March 2012
- Split from: People's Party
- Merged into: Proposta per les Illes
- Ideology: Liberalism; Balearic regionalism
- Political position: Centre-right

The Regionalist League of the Balearic Islands (Catalan: Lliga Regionalista de les Illes Balears, Spanish: Liga Regionalista de las Islas Baleares EV–CEC) was a Balearic regionalist political party founded in February 2011 from members of the People's Party (PP) and merged into Proposta per les Illes in November 2012.
