= 2007 Balearic island council elections =

Elections in the Spanish region of the Balearic Islands

Island council elections were held in the Balearic Islands on 27 May 2007 to elect the 8th Consells Insulars of Mallorca and Menorca and the 1st Consells Insulars of Formentera and Ibiza. All 72 seats in the four island councils were up for election. They were held concurrently with regional elections in thirteen autonomous communities and local elections all across Spain.

This was the first time that a separate election was held to elect the members of the Island Councils after the ones held in 1979. From 1983 to 2003, their composition was determined by the Parliament of the Balearic Islands election results in each constituency. In addition, after these elections the Island Council of Ibiza and Formentera was separated into two Island Councils, one per each island, with the City Council of Formentera taking the functions of the Island Council. Therefore, the election results in Ibiza, Mallorca and Menorca are compared to the 2003 Balearic regional election in these constituencies, and the results in Formentera are compared to the 2003 Formentera City Council election.

== Opinion polls ==
The tables below list voting intention estimates in reverse chronological order, showing the most recent first and using the dates when the survey fieldwork was done, as opposed to the date of publication. Where the fieldwork dates are unknown, the date of publication is given instead. The highest percentage figure in each polling survey is displayed with its background shaded in the leading party's colour. If a tie ensues, this is applied to the figures with the highest percentages. The "Lead" column on the right shows the percentage-point difference between the parties with the highest percentages in a given poll. When available, seat projections are also displayed below the voting estimates in a smaller font.

=== Ibiza polling ===
| Polling firm/Commissioner | Fieldwork date | Sample size | Turnout | PP | Pacte | EV | PSOE–ExC | Lead |
|---|---|---|---|---|---|---|---|---|
| 2007 Island Council election | 27 May 2007 | —N/a | 54.5 | 46.7; 6 | (Note: Within PSOE–ExC.) | | 46.8; 7 | 0.1 |
| Grup Marest/Prensa Ibérica | 20–26 Apr 2007 | 500 | ? | 46.4; 6 | | | 49.0; 7 | 2.6 |
| Grup Marest/Prensa Ibérica | 20–30 Mar 2007 | 560 | ? | 43.7; 6 | | | 52.7; 7 | 9.0 |
| 2003 regional election | 25 May 2003 | —N/a | 57.7 | 50.4; 7 | 37.8; 5 | 3.2; 0 | – | 12.6 |

=== Mallorca polling ===
| Polling firm/Commissioner | Fieldwork date | Sample size | Turnout | PP | PSIB–PSOE | UM | PSM | EU–EV | Bloc | Lead |
|---|---|---|---|---|---|---|---|---|---|---|
| 2007 Island Council election | 27 May 2007 | —N/a | 61.0 | 45.8; 16 | 30.2; 11 | 9.9; 3 | (Note: Within Bloc.) | | 10.5; 3 | 15.6 |
| Grup Marest/Diario de Mallorca | 20–30 Mar 2007 | ? | ? | 42.1; 15 | 29.4; 10 | 9.4; 3 | | | 14.8; 5 | 12.7 |
| 2003 regional election | 25 May 2003 | —N/a | 63.7 | 45.0; 16 | 26.3; 9 | 9.2; 3 | 9.0; 3 | 5.5; 2 | – | 18.7 |

=== Menorca polling ===
| Polling firm/Commissioner | Fieldwork date | Sample size | Turnout | PP | PSIB–PSOE | PSM | Lead |
|---|---|---|---|---|---|---|---|
| 2007 Island Council election | 27 May 2007 | —N/a | 60.6 | 40.9; 6 | 40.6; 6 | 9.1; 1 | 0.3 |
| Grup Marest/Diario de Mallorca | 20–30 Mar 2007 | ? | ? | ? 6 | ? 6 | ? 1 | Tie |
| 2003 regional election | 25 May 2003 | —N/a | 60.6 | 39.1; 6 | 37.3; 6 | 8.1; 1 | 1.8 |

== Island control ==
The following table lists party control in the island councils. Gains for a party are highlighted in that party's colour.

| Island | Population | Previous control | New control |
|---|---|---|---|
| Formentera | 7,957 | → Newly-established | People for Formentera (GxF) |
| Ibiza | 113,908 | People's Party (PP) | Socialist Party of the Balearic Islands (PSIB–PSOE) |
| Mallorca | 790,763 | Majorcan Union (UM) | Socialist Party of the Balearic Islands (PSIB–PSOE) |
| Menorca | 88,434 | Socialist Party of the Balearic Islands (PSIB–PSOE) | Socialist Party of the Balearic Islands (PSIB–PSOE) |

== Islands ==
=== Formentera ===
Summary of the 27 May 2007 Island Council of Formentera election results →
| Parties and alliances | Popular vote | | | Seats | |
| Parties and alliances | Votes | % | ±pp | Total | +/− |
|---|---|---|---|---|---|
| People for Formentera (GxF) | 1,134 | 32.78 | New | 5 | +5 |
| People's Party (PP) | 1,068 | 30.88 | +6.77 | 4 | +1 |
| Socialist Party of the Balearic Islands (PSIB–PSOE)^{1} | 679 | 19.63 | −21.68 | 2 | −4 |
| Independents of Formentera Group (GUIF) | 518 | 14.98 | −6.90 | 2 | −1 |
| Renewal Party of Ibiza and Formentera (PREF) | n/a | n/a | −9.17 | 0 | −1 |
| Blank ballots | 60 | 1.73 | −1.80 | | |
| Total | 3,459 | | | 13 | ±0 |
| Valid votes | 3,459 | 98.91 | +0.32 | | |
| Invalid votes | 38 | 1.09 | −0.32 | | |
| Votes cast / turnout | 3,497 | 62.31 | −3.49 | | |
| Abstentions | 2,115 | 37.69 | +3.49 | | |
| Registered voters | 5,612 | | | | |
Sources
Footnotes: ^{1} Socialist Party of the Balearic Islands results are compared to Coalition of Progressive Organizations totals in the 2003 election.

=== Ibiza ===
← Summary of the 27 May 2007 Island Council of Ibiza election results →
| Parties and alliances | Popular vote | | | Seats | |
| Parties and alliances | Votes | % | ±pp | Total | +/− |
|---|---|---|---|---|---|
| PSOE–Ibiza for Change (PSOE–ExC)^{1} | 19,466 | 46.78 | +5.70 | 7 | +2 |
| People's Party (PP) | 19,428 | 46.69 | −3.72 | 6 | −1 |
| European Green Group (GVE) | 801 | 1.93 | +1.02 | 0 | ±0 |
| Pityusic Democracy (DP) | 470 | 1.13 | New | 0 | ±0 |
| Civic Union (UC) | 296 | 0.71 | −1.12 | 0 | ±0 |
| National Democracy (DN) | 150 | 0.36 | New | 0 | ±0 |
| Blank ballots | 998 | 2.40 | +0.11 | | |
| Total | 41,609 | | | 13 | +1 |
| Valid votes | 41,609 | 99.25 | +0.13 | | |
| Invalid votes | 316 | 0.75 | −0.13 | | |
| Votes cast / turnout | 41,925 | 54.47 | −3.20 | | |
| Abstentions | 35,044 | 45.53 | +3.20 | | |
| Registered voters | 76,969 | | | | |
Sources
Footnotes: ^{1} PSOE–Ibiza for Change results are compared to the combined totals of Progressive Pact and The Greens of Ibiza in the 2003 election.

=== Mallorca ===
← Summary of the 27 May 2007 Island Council of Mallorca election results →
| Parties and alliances | Popular vote | | | Seats | |
| Parties and alliances | Votes | % | ±pp | Total | +/− |
|---|---|---|---|---|---|
| People's Party (PP) | 154,112 | 45.79 | +0.78 | 16 | ±0 |
| Socialist Party of the Balearic Islands (PSIB–PSOE) | 101,497 | 30.16 | +3.84 | 11 | +2 |
| Bloc for Mallorca (PSM–EN, EU–EV, ERC)^{1} | 35,301 | 10.49 | −4.45 | 3 | −2 |
| Majorcan Union (UM) | 33,357 | 9.91 | +0.72 | 3 | ±0 |
| Independent Social Group (ASI) | 2,062 | 0.61 | −1.05 | 0 | ±0 |
| Workers for Democracy Coalition (TD) | 832 | 0.25 | +0.12 | 0 | ±0 |
| Citizens for Blank Votes (CenB) | 831 | 0.25 | New | 0 | ±0 |
| Balearic Party (PB) | 800 | 0.24 | New | 0 | ±0 |
| Balearic People's Union (UPB) | 636 | 0.19 | New | 0 | ±0 |
| Key of Majorca (Clau) | 589 | 0.18 | −0.70 | 0 | ±0 |
| Islander Party of the Balearic Islands (PIIB) | 370 | 0.11 | New | 0 | ±0 |
| Blank ballots | 6,170 | 1.83 | +0.26 | | |
| Total | 336,557 | | | 33 | ±0 |
| Valid votes | 336,557 | 99.43 | +0.03 | | |
| Invalid votes | 1,921 | 0.57 | −0.03 | | |
| Votes cast / turnout | 338,478 | 61.02 | −2.72 | | |
| Abstentions | 216,241 | 38.98 | +2.72 | | |
| Registered voters | 554,719 | | | | |
Sources
Footnotes: ^{1} Bloc for Mallorca results are compared to the combined totals of Socialist Party of Mallorca–Nationalist Agreement, United Left of Majorca–The Greens of Majorca and Republican Left of Catalonia in the 2003 election.

=== Menorca ===
← Summary of the 27 May 2007 Island Council of Menorca election results →
| Parties and alliances | Popular vote | | | Seats | |
| Parties and alliances | Votes | % | ±pp | Total | +/− |
|---|---|---|---|---|---|
| People's Party (PP) | 15,027 | 40.92 | +1.84 | 6 | ±0 |
| Socialist Party of the Balearic Islands (PSIB–PSOE) | 14,897 | 40.57 | +3.23 | 6 | ±0 |
| PSM–Nationalist Agreement–The Greens of Menorca (PSM–EN, EV–Me)^{1} | 3,350 | 9.12 | −1.95 | 1 | ±0 |
| Left of Menorca–United Left (EM–EU) | 1,615 | 4.40 | −0.39 | 0 | ±0 |
| Union of Centrists of Menorca (UCM) | 745 | 2.03 | −1.07 | 0 | ±0 |
| Citizens for Blank Votes (CenB) | 281 | 0.77 | −0.37 | 0 | ±0 |
| Blank ballots | 805 | 2.19 | +0.62 | | |
| Total | 36,720 | | | 13 | ±0 |
| Valid votes | 36,720 | 99.31 | +0.08 | | |
| Invalid votes | 255 | 0.69 | −0.08 | | |
| Votes cast / turnout | 36,975 | 58.70 | −1.92 | | |
| Abstentions | 26,017 | 41.30 | +1.92 | | |
| Registered voters | 62,992 | | | | |
Sources
Footnotes: ^{1} PSM–Nationalist Agreement–The Greens of Menorca results are compared to the combined totals of Socialist Party of Menorca–Nationalist Agreement and The Greens of Menorca in the 2003 election.

== See also ==
- 2007 Balearic regional election
