= 2003 Spanish local elections in the Balearic Islands =

This article presents the results breakdown of the local elections held in the Balearic Islands on 25 May 2003. The following tables show detailed results in the autonomous community's most populous municipalities, sorted alphabetically.

== City control ==
The following table lists party control in the most populous municipalities, including provincial capitals (highlighted in bold). Gains for a party are highlighted in that party's colour.

Municipality	Population	Previous control	New control
Ciutadella de Menorca	24,741	Socialist Party of the Balearic Islands (PSIB–PSOE)	People's Party (PP)
Ibiza	37,408	Socialist Party of the Balearic Islands (PSIB–PSOE)	Socialist Party of the Balearic Islands (PSIB–PSOE)
Inca	24,467	People's Party (PP)	People's Party (PP)
Llucmajor	26,466	People's Party (PP)	People's Party (PP)
Manacor	33,326	Liberal Alternative for Manacor–Majorcan Union (ALM–UM)	People's Party–Union of Convergences (PP–UC)
Maó-Mahón	25,187	Socialist Party of the Balearic Islands (PSIB–PSOE)	Socialist Party of the Balearic Islands (PSIB–PSOE)
**Palma de Mallorca**	358,462	People's Party (PP)	People's Party (PP)
Santa Eulària des Riu	25,080	People's Party (PP)	People's Party (PP)

== Municipalities ==
=== Ciutadella de Menorca ===
Population: 24,741

← Summary of the 25 May 2003 City Council of Ciutadella de Menorca election results →
Parties and alliances	Popular vote			Seats	
Parties and alliances	Votes	%	±pp	Total	+/−
People's Party (PP)	4,709	41.17	+3.88	10	+1
Socialist Party of the Balearic Islands (PSIB–PSOE)	2,780	24.30	−2.81	6	±0
Socialist Party of Menorca–Nationalist Agreement (PSM–EN)	1,350	11.80	−0.51	2	−1
Menorcan Party (PMQ)	883	7.72	+1.74	1	±0
Union of Centrists of Menorca (UCM)^{1}	713	6.23	−2.44	1	−1
Left of Menorca–The Greens (EM–EV)	608	5.32	+0.97	1	+1
Citizens for Blank Votes (CenB)	139	1.22	New	0	±0
Balearic People's Union (UPB)	47	0.41	−1.34	0	±0
Blank ballots	209	1.83	−0.71		
Total	11,438			21	±0
Valid votes	11,438	99.42	+0.48		
Invalid votes	67	0.58	−0.48		
Votes cast / turnout	11,505	58.64	−1.99		
Abstentions	8,115	41.36	+1.99		
Registered voters	19,620				
Sources
Footnotes: ^{1} Union of Centrists of Menorca results are compared to Independents of Menorca totals in the 1999 election.

=== Ibiza ===
Population: 37,408

← Summary of the 25 May 2003 City Council of Ibiza election results →
Parties and alliances	Popular vote			Seats	
Parties and alliances	Votes	%	±pp	Total	+/−
Progressive Pact (Pacte)	6,807	44.24	−3.54	11	±0
People's Party (PP)	6,549	42.56	−4.55	10	±0
Independent Social Group (ASI)	473	3.07	New	0	±0
The Greens (EV–LV)	464	3.02	New	0	±0
Civic Union (UC)	351	2.28	New	0	±0
Renewal Party of Ibiza and Formentera (PREF)	147	0.96	New	0	±0
European Green Group (GVE)	128	0.83	New	0	±0
United Residents (RU)	119	0.77	New	0	±0
Blank ballots	350	2.27	−0.10		
Total	15,388			21	±0
Valid votes	15,388	99.29	+0.57		
Invalid votes	110	0.71	−0.57		
Votes cast / turnout	15,498	55.03	+3.58		
Abstentions	12,665	44.97	−3.58		
Registered voters	28,163				

=== Inca ===
Population: 24,467

← Summary of the 25 May 2003 City Council of Inca election results →
Parties and alliances	Popular vote			Seats	
Parties and alliances	Votes	%	±pp	Total	+/−
People's Party (PP)	6,674	55.62	−0.39	13	±0
Socialist Party of the Balearic Islands (PSIB–PSOE)	2,177	18.14	−2.22	4	−1
Socialist Party of Mallorca–Nationalist Agreement (PSM–EN)	1,203	10.02	−0.40	2	±0
Independents of Inca (INDI)	684	5.70	−0.06	1	±0
Majorcan Union (UM)	654	5.45	+2.37	1	+1
United Left of Majorca–The Greens of Majorca (EU–EV)	479	3.99	+1.02	0	±0
Blank ballots	129	1.08	+0.25		
Total	12,000			21	±0
Valid votes	12,000	99.44	−0.07		
Invalid votes	68	0.56	+0.07		
Votes cast / turnout	12,068	66.77	+0.36		
Abstentions	6,005	33.23	−0.36		
Registered voters	18,073				

=== Llucmajor ===
Population: 26,466

← Summary of the 25 May 2003 City Council of Llucmajor election results →
Parties and alliances	Popular vote			Seats	
Parties and alliances	Votes	%	±pp	Total	+/−
People's Party (PP)	5,736	45.20	+3.37	11	+1
Socialist Party of the Balearic Islands (PSIB–PSOE)	3,184	25.09	+0.50	6	±0
Independent Social Group (ASI)	1,527	12.03	+2.54	2	±0
Socialist Party of Mallorca–Nationalist Agreement (PSM–EN)	961	7.57	−3.09	1	−1
Majorcan Union (UM)	667	5.26	−2.12	1	±0
United Left–The Greens (EU–EV)	371	2.92	+0.13	0	±0
Key of Mallorca (CM)	97	0.76	New	0	±0
Blank ballots	148	1.17	−0.23		
Total	12,691			21	±0
Valid votes	12,691	99.17	+0.95		
Invalid votes	106	0.83	−0.95		
Votes cast / turnout	12,797	63.77	+4.88		
Abstentions	7,269	36.23	−4.88		
Registered voters	20,066				

=== Manacor ===
Population: 33,326

← Summary of the 25 May 2003 City Council of Manacor election results →
Parties and alliances	Popular vote			Seats	
Parties and alliances	Votes	%	±pp	Total	+/−
People's Party–Union of Convergences (PP–UC)^{1}	5,624	35.85	−7.24	9	−1
Liberal Alternative for Manacor–Majorcan Union (ALM–UM)^{2}	3,712	23.66	+14.38	6	+5
Socialist Party of the Balearic Islands (PSIB–PSOE)	1,697	10.82	+3.15	2	±0
Socialist Party of Mallorca–Nationalist Agreement (PSM–EN)	1,590	10.13	−12.12	2	−3
Independent Group of Porto Cristo (AIPC)	1,509	9.62	−1.57	2	−1
United Left of Majorca–The Greens of Majorca (EU–EV)	694	4.42	+1.12	0	±0
Republican Left of Catalonia (ERC)	479	3.05	+1.04	0	±0
Key of Majorca (CM)	174	1.11	New	0	±0
Blank ballots	210	1.34	+0.11		
Total	15,689			21	±0
Valid votes	15,689	99.61	+0.23		
Invalid votes	61	0.39	−0.23		
Votes cast / turnout	15,750	62.68	+6.30		
Abstentions	9,377	37.32	−6.30		
Registered voters	25,127				
Sources
Footnotes: ^{1} People's Party–Union of Convergences results are compared to the combined totals of People's Party and Union of Convergences in the 1999 election.; ^{2} Liberal Alternative for Manacor–Majorcan Union results are compared to the combined totals of Liberal Alternative for Manacor and Majorcan Union in the 1999 election.

=== Maó-Mahón ===
Population: 25,187

← Summary of the 25 May 2003 City Council of Maó-Mahón election results →
Parties and alliances	Popular vote			Seats	
Parties and alliances	Votes	%	±pp	Total	+/−
Socialist Party of the Balearic Islands (PSIB–PSOE)	4,625	41.89	−12.97	10	−2
People's Party (PP)	3,994	36.17	+5.29	8	+1
Socialist Party of Menorca–Nationalist Agreement (PSM–EN)	1,005	9.10	+3.41	2	+1
Left of Menorca–United Left (EM–EU)	589	5.33	+0.32	1	±0
The Greens of Menorca (EV–Me)	363	3.29	New	0	±0
Citizens for Blank Votes (CenB)	181	1.64	New	0	±0
Union of Centrists of Menorca (UCM)	84	0.76	New	0	±0
Balearic People's Union (UPB)	32	0.29	−1.29	0	±0
Blank ballots	168	1.52	−0.46		
Total	11,041			21	±0
Valid votes	11,041	99.56	+0.24		
Invalid votes	49	0.44	−0.24		
Votes cast / turnout	11,090	58.21	+3.17		
Abstentions	7,961	41.79	−3.17		
Registered voters	19,051				

=== Palma de Mallorca ===
Population: 358,462

← Summary of the 25 May 2003 City Council of Palma de Mallorca election results →
Parties and alliances	Popular vote			Seats	
Parties and alliances	Votes	%	±pp	Total	+/−
People's Party (PP)	70,567	46.06	+2.08	15	±0
Socialist Party of the Balearic Islands (PSIB–PSOE)	41,531	27.11	+1.14	9	+1
United Left–The Greens (EU–EV)	15,909	10.38	+1.79	3	+1
Socialist Party of Mallorca–Nationalist Agreement (PSM–EN)	9,779	6.38	−4.27	2	−1
Majorcan Union (UM)	6,430	4.20	−1.66	0	−1
Independent Social Group (ASI)	3,145	2.05	+1.22	0	±0
Key of Majorca (CM)	1,428	0.93	New	0	±0
Balearic Islands Renewal Party (PRIB)	771	0.50	New	0	±0
Republican Left of Catalonia (ERC)	444	0.29	+0.01	0	±0
Workers for Democracy Coalition (TD)	264	0.17	−0.05	0	±0
Blank ballots	2,928	1.91	−0.45		
Total	153,196			29	±0
Valid votes	153,196	99.38	+0.81		
Invalid votes	949	0.62	−0.81		
Votes cast / turnout	154,145	56.51	+9.46		
Abstentions	118,612	43.49	−9.46		
Registered voters	272,757				

=== Santa Eulària des Riu ===
Population: 25,080

← Summary of the 25 May 2003 City Council of Santa Eulària des Riu election results →
Parties and alliances	Popular vote			Seats	
Parties and alliances	Votes	%	±pp	Total	+/−
People's Party (PP)	5,659	59.00	+1.44	14	+1
Progressive Pact (Pacte)	2,757	28.74	−8.25	7	−1
The Greens (EV–LV)	358	3.73	New	0	±0
Independent Social Group (ASI)	259	2.70	New	0	±0
Civic Union (UCP)	237	2.47	−0.98	0	±0
European Green Group (GVE)	69	0.72	New	0	±0
Balearic Democratic Union (UDB)	56	0.58	New	0	±0
Blank ballots	197	2.05	+0.05		
Total	9,592			21	±0
Valid votes	9,592	98.99	+0.41		
Invalid votes	98	1.01	−0.41		
Votes cast / turnout	9,690	57.76	+2.21		
Abstentions	7,087	42.24	−2.21		
Registered voters	16,777				

== See also ==
- 2003 Balearic regional election
