= 1999 Spanish local elections in the Balearic Islands =

This article presents the results breakdown of the local elections held in the Balearic Islands on 13 June 1999. The following tables show detailed results in the autonomous community's most populous municipalities, sorted alphabetically.

== City control ==
The following table lists party control in the most populous municipalities, including provincial capitals (highlighted in bold). Gains for a party are highlighted in that party's colour.

Municipality	Population	Previous control	New control
Ciutadella de Menorca	21,785	People's Party (PP)	Socialist Party of the Balearic Islands (PSIB–PSOE)
Ibiza	31,582	People's Party (PP)	Socialist Party of the Balearic Islands (PSIB–PSOE)
Inca	21,103	People's Party (PP)	People's Party (PP)
Llucmajor	21,771	People's Party (PP)	People's Party (PP)
Manacor	30,177	People's Party (PP)	Liberal Alternative for Manacor (ALM)
Maó-Mahón	22,358	Socialist Party of the Balearic Islands (PSIB–PSOE)	Socialist Party of the Balearic Islands (PSIB–PSOE)
**Palma de Mallorca**	319,181	People's Party (PP)	People's Party (PP)
Santa Eulària des Riu	20,306	People's Party (PP)	People's Party (PP)

== Municipalities ==
=== Ciutadella de Menorca ===
Population: 21,785

← Summary of the 13 June 1999 City Council of Ciutadella de Menorca election results →
Parties and alliances	Popular vote			Seats	
Parties and alliances	Votes	%	±pp	Total	+/−
People's Party (PP)	3,925	37.29	−15.75	9	−3
Socialist Party of the Balearic Islands (PSIB–PSOE)	2,854	27.11	+2.11	6	±0
Socialist Party of Menorca–Nationalist Agreement (PSM–EN)	1,296	12.31	+1.10	3	+1
Independents of Menorca (INME)	913	8.67	+7.14	2	+2
Menorcan Party (PMQ)	629	5.98	New	1	+1
Left of Menorca–United Left (EM–EU)	458	4.35	−2.60	0	−1
Balearic People's Union (UPB)	184	1.75	New	0	±0
Blank ballots	267	2.54	+0.28		
Total	10,526			21	±0
Valid votes	10,526	98.94	−0.36		
Invalid votes	113	1.06	+0.36		
Votes cast / turnout	10,639	60.63	−0.71		
Abstentions	6,908	39.37	+0.71		
Registered voters	17,547				

=== Ibiza ===
Population: 31,582

← Summary of the 13 June 1999 City Council of Ibiza election results →
Parties and alliances	Popular vote			Seats	
Parties and alliances	Votes	%	±pp	Total	+/−
Progressive Pact (Pacte)^{1}	6,161	47.78	+1.00	11	+2
People's Party (PP)	6,075	47.11	−2.70	10	−2
The Greens–Green Group (LV–GV)	352	2.73	New	0	±0
Blank ballots	306	2.37	+1.28		
Total	12,894			21	±0
Valid votes	12,894	98.72	−0.79		
Invalid votes	167	1.28	+0.79		
Votes cast / turnout	13,061	51.45	−0.53		
Abstentions	12,323	48.55	+0.53		
Registered voters	25,384				
Sources
Footnotes: ^{1} Progressive Pact results are compared to the combined totals of Socialist Party of the Balearic Islands, The Greens, United Left, Nationalist and Ecologist Agreement and Republican Left of Catalonia in the 1995 election.

=== Inca ===
Population: 21,103

← Summary of the 13 June 1999 City Council of Inca election results →
Parties and alliances	Popular vote			Seats	
Parties and alliances	Votes	%	±pp	Total	+/−
People's Party (PP)	6,367	56.39	+15.44	13	+3
Socialist Party of the Balearic Islands (PSIB–PSOE)	2,299	20.36	−11.23	5	−3
Socialist Party of Mallorca–Nationalist Agreement (PSM–EN)	1,176	10.42	+1.91	2	±0
Independents of Inca (INDI)	650	5.76	+0.66	1	±0
Majorcan Union (UM)	348	3.08	−1.29	0	±0
United Left of Majorca–The Greens of Majorca (EU–EV)	335	2.97	−0.13	0	±0
Balearic Centre Union (UCB)	22	0.19	New	0	±0
Blank ballots	94	0.83	+0.16		
Total	11,291			21	±0
Valid votes	11,291	99.51	−0.14		
Invalid votes	56	0.49	+0.14		
Votes cast / turnout	11,347	66.41	−3.19		
Abstentions	5,738	33.59	+3.19		
Registered voters	17,085				

=== Llucmajor ===
Population: 21,771

← Summary of the 13 June 1999 City Council of Llucmajor election results →
Parties and alliances	Popular vote			Seats	
Parties and alliances	Votes	%	±pp	Total	+/−
People's Party (PP)	4,260	41.83	−0.63	10	+2
Socialist Party of the Balearic Islands (PSIB–PSOE)	2,504	24.59	−3.86	6	±0
Socialist Party of Mallorca–Nationalist Agreement (PSM–EN)	1,086	10.66	−0.25	2	±0
Independent Social Group (ASI)	966	9.49	+4.44	2	+1
Majorcan Union (UM)	752	7.38	+3.86	1	+1
United Left of Majorca–The Greens of Majorca (EU–EV)	284	2.79	−1.43	0	±0
Balearic Centre Union (UCB)	189	1.86	New	0	±0
Blank ballots	143	1.40	+0.30		
Total	10,184			21	+4
Valid votes	10,184	98.22	−1.01		
Invalid votes	185	1.78	+1.01		
Votes cast / turnout	10,369	58.89	−6.40		
Abstentions	7,238	41.11	+6.40		
Registered voters	17,607				

=== Manacor ===
Population: 30,177

← Summary of the 13 June 1999 City Council of Manacor election results →
Parties and alliances	Popular vote			Seats	
Parties and alliances	Votes	%	±pp	Total	+/−
People's Party (PP)	4,538	33.10	−2.40	8	−1
Socialist Party of Mallorca–Nationalist Agreement (PSM–EN)	3,050	22.25	+0.69	5	±0
Independent Group of Porto Cristo (AIPC)	1,534	11.19	+0.81	3	+1
Union of Convergences (CB–CM)^{1}	1,369	9.99	−0.86	2	±0
Socialist Party of the Balearic Islands (PSIB–PSOE)	1,052	7.67	−5.93	2	−1
Liberal Alternative for Manacor (ALM)	864	6.30	New	1	+1
United Left of Majorca–The Greens of Majorca (EU–EV)	452	3.30	+0.21	0	±0
Majorcan Union (UM)	408	2.98	+1.45	0	±0
Republican Left of Catalonia (ERC)	275	2.01	−0.32	0	±0
Blank ballots	168	1.23	+0.07		
Total	13,710			21	±0
Valid votes	13,710	99.38	−0.10		
Invalid votes	86	0.62	+0.10		
Votes cast / turnout	13,796	56.38	−4.01		
Abstentions	10,673	42.62	+4.01		
Registered voters	24,469				
Sources
Footnotes: ^{1} Union of Convergences results are compared to the combined totals of Balearic Convergence and Convergence of Manacor in the 1995 election.

=== Maó-Mahón ===
Population: 22,358

← Summary of the 13 June 1999 City Council of Maó-Mahón election results →
Parties and alliances	Popular vote			Seats	
Parties and alliances	Votes	%	±pp	Total	+/−
Socialist Party of the Balearic Islands (PSIB–PSOE)	5,471	54.86	+11.30	12	+2
People's Party (PP)	3,079	30.88	−4.95	7	−1
Socialist Party of Menorca–Nationalist Agreement (PSM–EN)	567	5.69	−0.34	1	±0
Left of Menorca–United Left (EM–EU)	500	5.01	−5.51	1	−1
Balearic People's Union (UPB)	158	1.58	New	0	±0
Blank ballots	197	1.98	+0.33		
Total	9,972			21	±0
Valid votes	9,972	99.32	+0.05		
Invalid votes	68	0.68	−0.05		
Votes cast / turnout	10,040	55.04	−5.85		
Abstentions	8,200	44.96	+5.85		
Registered voters	18,240				

=== Palma de Mallorca ===
Population: 319,181

← Summary of the 13 June 1999 City Council of Palma de Mallorca election results →
Parties and alliances	Popular vote			Seats	
Parties and alliances	Votes	%	±pp	Total	+/−
People's Party (PP)	53,596	43.98	−0.84	15	±0
Socialist Party of the Balearic Islands (PSIB–PSOE)	31,650	25.97	+2.47	8	±0
Socialist Party of Mallorca–Nationalist Agreement (PSM–EN)	12,983	10.65	+0.33	3	±0
United Left–The Greens (EU–EV)^{1}	10,465	8.59	−5.51	2	−1
Majorcan Union (UM)	7,137	5.86	+1.23	1	+1
Independent Social Group (ASI)	1,008	0.83	+0.34	0	±0
Balearic People's Coalition (CPB)	927	0.76	New	0	±0
Social Democrats for Progress (SDP)	430	0.35	New	0	±0
Republican Left of Catalonia (ERC)	346	0.28	−0.11	0	±0
Workers for Democracy Coalition (TD)^{2}	263	0.22	+0.04	0	±0
Humanist Party (PH)	177	0.15	New	0	±0
Blank ballots	2,870	2.36	+0.96		
Total	121,852			29	±0
Valid votes	121,852	98.57	−0.78		
Invalid votes	1,766	1.43	+0.78		
Votes cast / turnout	123,618	47.05	−10.95		
Abstentions	139,138	52.95	+10.95		
Registered voters	262,756				
Sources
Footnotes: ^{1} United Left–The Greens results are compared to the combined totals of United Left of Majorca and The Greens of the Balearic Islands in the 1995 election.; ^{2} Workers for Democracy Coalition results are compared to Neighbourhood Movement–New Socialist Party totals in the 1995 election.

=== Santa Eulària des Riu ===
Population: 20,306

← Summary of the 13 June 1999 City Council of Santa Eulària des Riu election results →
Parties and alliances	Popular vote			Seats	
Parties and alliances	Votes	%	±pp	Total	+/−
People's Party (PP)	4,754	57.56	−3.94	13	+2
Progressive Pact (Pacte)^{1}	3,055	36.99	+0.85	8	+2
Pityusic Civic Union (UCP)	285	3.45	New	0	±0
Blank ballots	165	2.00	+0.96		
Total	8,259			21	+4
Valid votes	8,259	98.58	−1.04		
Invalid votes	119	1.42	+1.04		
Votes cast / turnout	8,378	55.55	+1.16		
Abstentions	6,704	44.45	−1.16		
Registered voters	15,082				
Sources
Footnotes: ^{1} Progressive Pact results are compared to the combined totals of Socialist Party of the Balearic Islands, The Greens, United Left and Nationalist and Ecologist Agreement in the 1995 election.

== See also ==
- 1999 Balearic regional election
