= 16th Senate of Spain =

Session of Spain after 2026 election

←	15th	17th	→
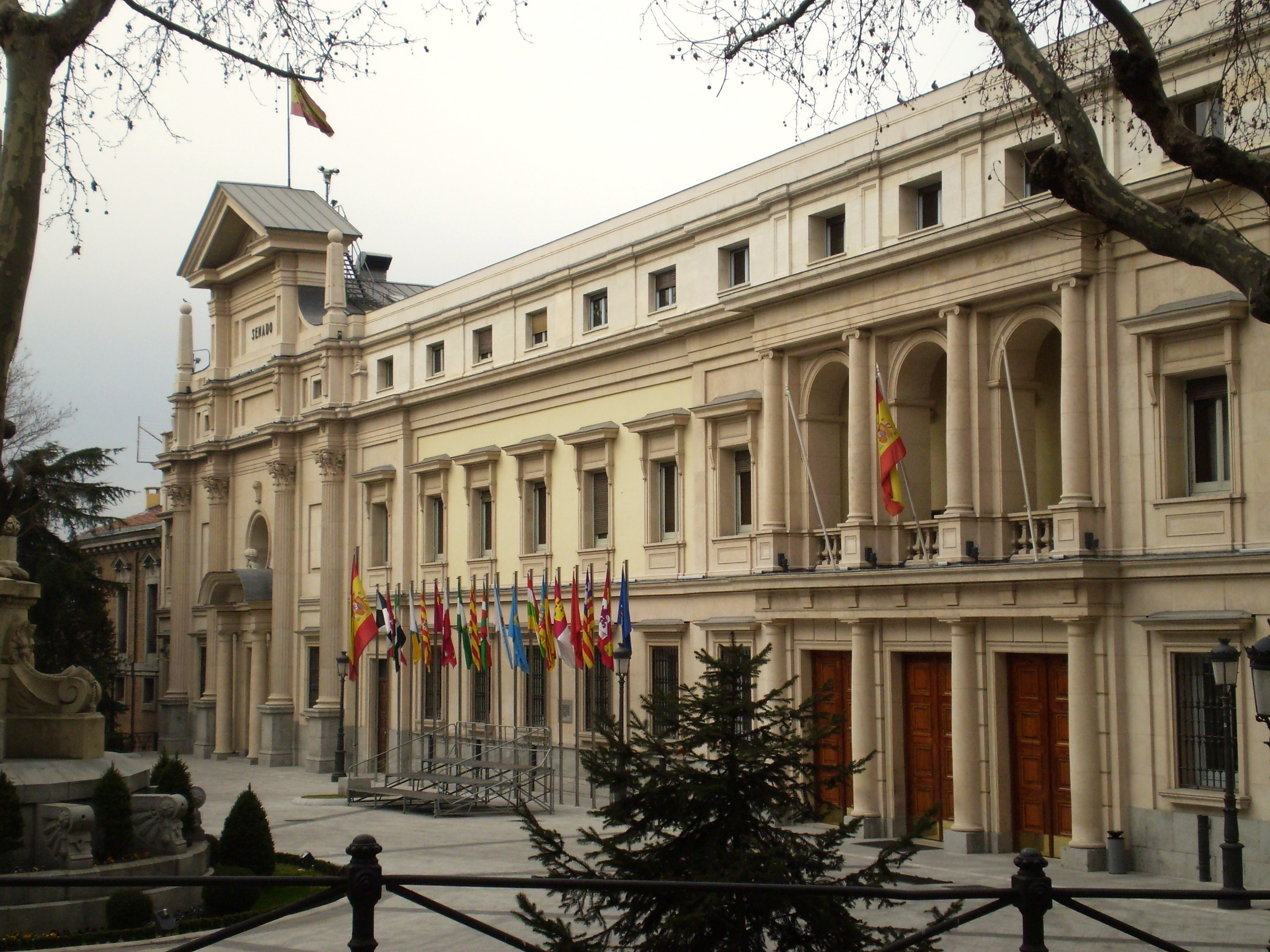

Overview
- Legislative body: Senate of Spain
- Meeting place: Palacio del Senado
- Term: December 2026 –
- Election: 29 November 2026
- Government: TBD
- Website: senado.es

Senators
- Members: 267
- President: TBD
- First Vice-President: TBD
- Second Vice-President: TBD
- First Secretary: TBD
- Second Secretary: TBD
- Third Secretary: TBD
- Fourth Secretary: TBD

The 16th Senate of Spain will be a meeting of the Senate of Spain, the upper house of the Spanish Cortes Generales, with the membership determined primarily by the results of the general election held on 29 November 2026. The Senate will meet for the first time on December 2026. According to the Constitution of Spain the maximum legislative term of the senate is 4 years from the preceding election. 209 (of 267) members of the Senate of Spain were elected in the 2026 Spanish general election to sit in the 16th Cortes Generales.

== Background ==
=== Election process ===
Most members of the Senate (currently 209 of 267) are directly elected by the people. Each province elects four senators without regard to population. Insular provinces are treated specially. The larger islands of the Canaries (Canarias) and Balearics (Baleares)—Gran Canaria, Tenerife, and Mallorca—are assigned three seats each, and the smaller islands—Fuerteventura, Gomera, Hierro, Lanzarote, La Palma, Menorca, and since 2026 Ibiza and Formentera—one each; Ceuta and Melilla are assigned two seats each.

This allocation is heavily weighted in favour of small provinces; as the most populated province Madrid, with its 7.2 million people, and Soria, with 90,000 inhabitants, are each represented by four senators.

== Election ==
The 16th Spanish general election under the 1978 Constitution was held on 29 November 2026.

Alliance	Senate	
Alliance	Seats	+/−
PP	0	±0
PSOE	0	±0
Vox	0	±0
Broad Front (FA)	0	±0
ERC–Sob–ERPV	0	±0
EH Bildu	0	±0
JxCat–Junts	0	±0
EAJ/PNV	0	±0
Others/blanks	0	±0
Total	208	±0

== Composition ==
	PP	PSOE		Vox	ERC	Junts	PNV	EH Bildu	BNG	CC	UPN	AHI	ASG	PAR	Total
	PP	PSOE	PSC	Vox	ERC	Junts	PNV	EH Bildu	BNG	CC	UPN	AHI	ASG	PAR	Total
Elected in 2026	0	0	0	0	0	0	0	0	0		0	0	0		209
Elected before 2026	0	0	0	0	0	0	0	0	0	0				0	58
Total	0	0	0	0	0	0	0	0	0	0	0	0	0	0	267
Changes during 2027 Spanish regional elections	0	0	0	0	0	0	0	0	0	0				0	28
Changes during 2027 Spanish regional elections	±0	±0	±0	±0	±0	±0	±0	±0	±0	±0			±0	±0	28

== History ==
The new Senate will meet for the first time on December 2026 and elected a new President of the Senate of Spain.

Other members of the Bureau of the Senate were also elected first vice-president; second vice-president; first secretary; second secretary; third secretary; and fourth secretary.

President
Candidate		Votes
TBD	—	0
TBD	—	0
Blank ballots		0
Invalid ballots		0
Absentees		0
Vacant		0
Total		267

Vice-president
Candidate		Votes
TBD	—	0
TBD	—	0
TBD	—	0
Blank ballots		0
Invalid ballots		0
Absentees		0
Vacant		0
Total		267

Secretary
Candidate		Votes
TBD	—	0
TBD	—	0
TBD	—	0
TBD	—	0
TBD	—	0
TBD	—	0
Blank ballots		0
Invalid ballots		0
Absentees		0
Vacant		0
Total		0

== Deaths, disqualifications, resignations, suspensions and regional legislature appointments ==
The 16th Senate has seen the following deaths, disqualifications, resignations, suspensions and regional legislature appointments:

== Members by constituency ==
Name	Constituency	No.	Votes	Party	Alliance	Group	Took office	Left office	Notes

== See also ==
- 16th Cortes Generales
- 16th Congress of Deputies

== Sources ==
- "Otras Disposiciones: Junta Electoral Central – Elecciones generales. Proclamación de candidaturas" (PDF). Boletín Oficial del Estado (in Spanish). No. 79. Madrid, Spain: Government of Spain. 2 April 2019. pp. 34184–34462. ISSN 0212-033X.
- "Otras Disposiciones: Junta Electoral Central – Elecciones generales. Resultados" (PDF). Boletín Oficial del Estado (in Spanish). No. 129. Madrid, Spain: Government of Spain. 30 May 2019. pp. 57384–57391. ISSN 0212-033X.
