= 1995 Spanish local elections in the Balearic Islands =

This article presents the results breakdown of the local elections held in the Balearic Islands on 28 May 1995. The following tables show detailed results in the autonomous community's most populous municipalities, sorted alphabetically.

== City control ==
The following table lists party control in the most populous municipalities, including provincial capitals (highlighted in bold). Gains for a party are highlighted in that party's colour.

Municipality	Population	Previous control	New control
Ciutadella de Menorca	21,026	People's Party (PP)	People's Party (PP)
Ibiza	34,336	People's Party (PP)	People's Party (PP)
Inca	21,407	Socialist Party of the Balearic Islands (PSIB–PSOE)	People's Party (PP)
Llucmajor	19,606	People's Party (PP)	People's Party (PP)
Manacor	28,653	People's Party (PP)	People's Party (PP)
Maó-Mahón	23,090	Socialist Party of the Balearic Islands (PSIB–PSOE)	Socialist Party of the Balearic Islands (PSIB–PSOE)
**Palma de Mallorca**	322,008	People's Party (PP)	People's Party (PP)
Santa Eulària des Riu	18,386	People's Party (PP)	People's Party (PP)

== Municipalities ==
=== Ciutadella de Menorca ===
Population: 21,026

← Summary of the 28 May 1995 City Council of Ciutadella de Menorca election results →
Parties and alliances	Popular vote			Seats	
Parties and alliances	Votes	%	±pp	Total	+/−
People's Party (PP)	5,294	53.04	+2.64	**12**	±0
Socialist Party of the Balearic Islands (PSIB–PSOE)	2,495	25.00	−4.52	**6**	−1
Socialist Party of Menorca–Nationalists of the Islands (PSM)^{1}	1,119	11.21	n/a	**2**	+1
Left of Menorca (EM–IU)^{1}	694	6.95	n/a	**1**	±0
Independents of Menorca (INME)	153	1.53	New	0	±0
Blank ballots	226	2.26	+1.29		
**Total**	**9,981**			**21**	**±0**
Valid votes	9,981	99.30	−0.08		
Invalid votes	70	0.70	+0.08		
**Votes cast / turnout**	**10,051**	**61.34**	**−6.83**		
Abstentions	6,335	38.66	+6.83		
**Registered voters**	**16,386**				
Sources
Footnotes: ^{1} Within the Agreement of the Left of Menorca alliance in the 1991 election.

=== Ibiza ===
Population: 34,336

← Summary of the 28 May 1995 City Council of Ibiza election results →
Parties and alliances	Popular vote			Seats	
Parties and alliances	Votes	%	±pp	Total	+/−
People's Party (PP)	6,319	49.81	+1.43	**12**	+1
Socialist Party of the Balearic Islands (PSIB–PSOE)	3,776	29.76	−7.70	**7**	−2
United Left (EU–IU)	908	7.16	+3.43	**1**	+1
The Greens (EV)	869	6.85	New	**1**	+1
Independents of Ibiza and Formentera Federation (FIEF)	296	2.33	−1.41	0	±0
Nationalist and Ecologist Agreement (ENE)	276	2.18	−2.08	0	−1
Republican Left of Catalonia (ERC)	105	0.83	New	0	±0
Blank ballots	138	1.09	+0.23		
**Total**	**12,687**			**21**	**±0**
Valid votes	12,687	99.51	+0.16		
Invalid votes	63	0.49	−0.16		
**Votes cast / turnout**	**12,750**	**51.98**	**+5.79**		
Abstentions	11,781	48.02	−5.79		
**Registered voters**	**24,531**				

=== Inca ===
Population: 21,407

← Summary of the 28 May 1995 City Council of Inca election results →
Parties and alliances	Popular vote			Seats	
Parties and alliances	Votes	%	±pp	Total	+/−
People's Party (PP)	4,610	40.95	−1.33	**10**	±0
Socialist Party of the Balearic Islands (PSIB–PSOE)	3,556	31.59	−1.69	**8**	±0
Socialist Party of Mallorca–Nationalists of Majorca (PSM–NM)	958	8.51	−1.42	**2**	±0
Independents of Inca (INDI)	574	5.10	−0.45	**1**	±0
Majorcan Union (UM)^{1}	492	4.37	+2.05	0	±0
Inquer Union (UNIN)	391	3.47	New	0	±0
United Left of Majorca (EU–IU)	349	3.10	+0.68	0	±0
Independent Social Group (ASI)	142	1.26	New	0	±0
Republican Left of Catalonia (ERC)	75	0.67	New	0	±0
Spanish Phalanx of the CSNO (FE–JONS)	35	0.31	New	0	±0
Blank ballots	75	0.67	−0.04		
**Total**	**11,257**			**29**	**±0**
Valid votes	11,257	99.65	+0.07		
Invalid votes	40	0.35	−0.07		
**Votes cast / turnout**	**11,297**	**69.60**	**+4.90**		
Abstentions	4,935	30.40	−4.90		
**Registered voters**	**16,232**				
Sources
Footnotes: ^{1} Majorcan Union results are compared to Balearic Convergence totals in the 1991 election.

=== Llucmajor ===
Population: 19,606

← Summary of the 28 May 1995 City Council of Llucmajor election results →
Parties and alliances	Popular vote			Seats	
Parties and alliances	Votes	%	±pp	Total	+/−
People's Party (PP)	4,198	42.46	+5.75	**8**	+1
Socialist Party of the Balearic Islands (PSIB–PSOE)	2,813	28.45	−5.07	**6**	−1
Socialist Party of Mallorca–Nationalists of Majorca (PSM–NM)	1,079	10.91	+5.91	**2**	+2
Independent Social Group (ASI)	499	5.05	−12.32	**1**	−2
Independent Group of s'Arenal (GIS'A)	423	4.28	New	0	±0
United Left of Majorca (EU–IU)	417	4.22	+3.35	0	±0
Majorcan Union (UM)^{1}	348	3.52	+0.48	0	±0
Blank ballots	109	1.10	+0.09		
**Total**	**9,886**			**17**	**±0**
Valid votes	9,886	99.23	−0.01		
Invalid votes	77	0.77	+0.01		
**Votes cast / turnout**	**9,963**	**65.29**	**−1.01**		
Abstentions	5,297	34.71	+1.01		
**Registered voters**	**15,260**				
Sources
Footnotes: ^{1} Majorcan Union results are compared to Balearic Convergence totals in the 1991 election.

=== Manacor ===
Population: 28,653

← Summary of the 28 May 1995 City Council of Manacor election results →
Parties and alliances	Popular vote			Seats	
Parties and alliances	Votes	%	±pp	Total	+/−
People's Party (PP)	4,674	35.50	−4.77	**9**	−1
Socialist Party of Mallorca–Nationalists of Majorca (PSM–NM)	2,839	21.56	+9.89	**5**	+2
Socialist Party of the Balearic Islands (PSIB–PSOE)	1,791	13.60	−9.30	**3**	−2
Independent Group of Porto Cristo (AIPC)	1,367	10.38	New	**2**	+2
Balearic Convergence (CB)	755	5.73	−4.62	**1**	−1
Convergence of Manacor (CM)	674	5.12	−0.68	**1**	±0
United Left of Majorca (EU–IU)	407	3.09	+1.54	0	±0
Republican Left of Catalonia (ERC)	307	2.33	New	0	±0
Majorcan Union (UM)^{1}	201	1.53	−1.69	0	±0
Blank ballots	153	1.16	+0.02		
**Total**	**13,168**			**21**	**±0**
Valid votes	13,168	99.48	+0.11		
Invalid votes	69	0.52	−0.11		
**Votes cast / turnout**	**13,237**	**60.39**	**+2.69**		
Abstentions	8,681	39.61	−2.69		
**Registered voters**	**21,918**				
Sources
Footnotes: ^{1} Majorcan Union results are compared to Independent Union of Majorca–Independents of Majorca totals in the 1991 election.

=== Maó-Mahón ===
Population: 23,090

← Summary of the 28 May 1995 City Council of Maó-Mahón election results →
Parties and alliances	Popular vote			Seats	
Parties and alliances	Votes	%	±pp	Total	+/−
Socialist Party of the Balearic Islands (PSIB–PSOE)	4,805	43.56	−2.35	**10**	−1
People's Party (PP)	3,952	35.83	−1.30	**8**	±0
Left of Menorca (EM–IU)^{1}	1,160	10.52	n/a	**2**	+2
Socialist Party of Menorca–Nationalists of the Islands (PSM)^{1}	665	6.03	n/a	**1**	−1
Independents of Menorca (INME)	267	2.42	New	0	±0
Blank ballots	182	1.65	+0.02		
**Total**	**11,031**			**21**	**±0**
Valid votes	11,031	99.27	−0.32		
Invalid votes	81	0.73	+0.32		
**Votes cast / turnout**	**11,112**	**60.89**	**+3.94**		
Abstentions	7,136	39.11	−3.94		
**Registered voters**	**18,248**				
Sources
Footnotes: ^{1} Within the Agreement of the Left of Menorca alliance in the 1991 election.

=== Palma de Mallorca ===
Population: 322,008

← Summary of the 28 May 1995 City Council of Palma de Mallorca election results →
Parties and alliances	Popular vote			Seats	
Parties and alliances	Votes	%	±pp	Total	+/−
People's Party (PP)	63,331	44.82	−2.98	**15**	−2
Socialist Party of the Balearic Islands (PSIB–PSOE)	33,200	23.50	−7.02	**8**	−2
Socialist Party of Mallorca–Nationalists of Majorca (PSM–NM)	14,587	10.32	+4.41	**3**	+1
United Left of Majorca (EU–IU)	13,890	9.83	+5.61	**3**	+3
Majorcan Union (UM)^{1}	6,540	4.63	+0.94	0	±0
The Greens of the Balearic Islands (EVIB)	6,026	4.27	+0.66	0	±0
Independent Social Group (ASI)	691	0.49	New	0	±0
Republican Left of Catalonia (ERC)	548	0.39	New	0	±0
Platform of Independents of Spain (PIE)	253	0.18	New	0	±0
Neighbourhood Movement–New Socialist Party (MV–NPS)^{2}	251	0.18	−0.20	0	±0
Blank ballots	1,972	1.40	+0.31		
**Total**	**141,289**			**29**	**±0**
Valid votes	141,289	99.35	−0.02		
Invalid votes	927	0.65	+0.02		
**Votes cast / turnout**	**142,216**	**58.00**	**+6.78**		
Abstentions	102,993	42.00	−6.78		
**Registered voters**	**245,209**				
Sources
Footnotes: ^{1} Majorcan Union results are compared to the combined totals of Independent Union of Majorca–Independents of Majorca and Balearic Convergence in the 1991 election.; ^{2} Neighbourhood Movement–New Socialist Party results are compared to Alliance for the Republic totals in the 1991 election.

=== Santa Eulària des Riu ===
Population: 18,386

← Summary of the 28 May 1995 City Council of Santa Eulària des Riu election results →
Parties and alliances	Popular vote			Seats	
Parties and alliances	Votes	%	±pp	Total	+/−
People's Party (PP)	4,381	61.50	+0.21	**11**	−1
Socialist Party of the Balearic Islands (PSIB–PSOE)	1,607	22.56	−1.90	**4**	±0
United Left (EU–IU)	410	5.76	+3.00	**1**	+1
The Greens (EV)	386	5.42	New	**1**	+1
Nationalist and Ecologist Agreement (ENE)	171	2.40	−1.21	0	±0
Independents of Ibiza and Formentera Federation (FIEF)	94	1.32	−5.00	0	−1
Blank ballots	74	1.04	+0.39		
**Total**	**7,123**			**17**	**±0**
Valid votes	7,123	99.62	+0.06		
Invalid votes	27	0.38	−0.06		
**Votes cast / turnout**	**7,150**	**54.39**	**−1.14**		
Abstentions	5,996	45.61	+1.14		
**Registered voters**	**13,146**				

== See also ==
- 1995 Balearic regional election
