= 1991 Spanish local elections in the Balearic Islands =

This article presents the results breakdown of the local elections held in the Balearic Islands on 26 May 1991. The following tables show detailed results in the autonomous community's most populous municipalities, sorted alphabetically.

== City control ==
The following table lists party control in the most populous municipalities, including provincial capitals (highlighted in bold). Gains for a party are highlighted in that party's colour.

| Municipality | Population | Previous control | New control |
|---|---|---|---|
| Ciutadella de Menorca | 21,092 | Spanish Socialist Workers' Party (PSOE) | People's Party (PP) |
| Ibiza | 33,776 | People's Party (PP) | People's Party (PP) |
| Inca | 22,219 | Majorcan Union (UM) | Socialist Party of the Balearic Islands (PSIB–PSOE) |
| Llucmajor | 17,977 | Socialist Party of the Balearic Islands (PSIB–PSOE) | People's Party (PP) |
| Manacor | 28,791 | Socialist Party of the Balearic Islands (PSIB–PSOE) | People's Party (PP) |
| Maó-Mahón | 24,383 | Socialist Party of the Balearic Islands (PSIB–PSOE) | Socialist Party of the Balearic Islands (PSIB–PSOE) |
| **Palma de Mallorca** | 325,120 | Socialist Party of the Balearic Islands (PSIB–PSOE) | People's Party (PP) |
| Santa Eulària des Riu | 17,615 | People's Party (PP) | People's Party (PP) |

== Municipalities ==
=== Ciutadella de Menorca ===
Population: 21,092

← Summary of the 26 May 1991 City Council of Ciutadella de Menorca election results →
| Parties and alliances | Popular vote | | | Seats | |
| Parties and alliances | Votes | % | ±pp | Total | +/− |
|---|---|---|---|---|---|
| People's Party (PP)^{1} | 5,384 | 50.40 | +10.13 | 12 | +5 |
| Socialist Party of the Balearic Islands (PSIB–PSOE) | 3,154 | 29.52 | −7.25 | 7 | ±0 |
| Agreement of the Left of Menorca (PSM–EU) | 1,193 | 11.17 | −0.93 | 2 | ±0 |
| Democratic and Social Centre (CDS) | 400 | 3.74 | −5.44 | 0 | −1 |
| Progressive Union of Menorca (UPdeM) | 262 | 2.45 | New | 0 | ±0 |
| Ciutadellan People in the City Hall (CS) | 186 | 1.74 | New | 0 | ±0 |
| Blank ballots | 104 | 0.97 | −0.71 | | |
| Total | 10,683 | | | 21 | +4 |
| Valid votes | 10,683 | 99.38 | −0.14 | | |
| Invalid votes | 67 | 0.62 | +0.14 | | |
| Votes cast / turnout | 10,750 | 68.17 | +2.73 | | |
| Abstentions | 5,020 | 31.83 | −2.73 | | |
| Registered voters | 15,770 | | | | |
Sources
Footnotes: ^{1} People's Party (PP) results are compared to People's Alliance–Liberal Party totals in the 1987 election.

=== Ibiza ===
Population: 33,776

← Summary of the 26 May 1991 City Council of Ibiza election results →
| Parties and alliances | Popular vote | | | Seats | |
| Parties and alliances | Votes | % | ±pp | Total | +/− |
|---|---|---|---|---|---|
| People's Party (PP)^{1} | 5,314 | 48.38 | +8.90 | 11 | +2 |
| Socialist Party of the Balearic Islands (PSIB–PSOE) | 4,115 | 37.46 | −4.97 | 9 | ±0 |
| Nationalist and Ecologist Agreement (ENE) | 468 | 4.26 | New | 1 | +1 |
| Independents of Ibiza and Formentera Federation (FIEF) | 411 | 3.74 | New | 0 | ±0 |
| United Left (EU–IU) | 410 | 3.73 | −0.34 | 0 | ±0 |
| Democratic and Social Centre (CDS) | 172 | 1.57 | −11.42 | 0 | −3 |
| Blank ballots | 95 | 0.86 | −0.16 | | |
| Total | 10,985 | | | 21 | ±0 |
| Valid votes | 10,985 | 99.35 | +0.60 | | |
| Invalid votes | 72 | 0.65 | −0.60 | | |
| Votes cast / turnout | 11,057 | 46.19 | −7.40 | | |
| Abstentions | 12,822 | 53.81 | +7.40 | | |
| Registered voters | 23,939 | | | | |
Sources
Footnotes: ^{1} People's Party (PP) results are compared to People's Alliance–Liberal Party totals in the 1987 election.

=== Inca ===
Population: 22,219

← Summary of the 26 May 1991 City Council of Inca election results →
| Parties and alliances | Popular vote | | | Seats | |
| Parties and alliances | Votes | % | ±pp | Total | +/− |
|---|---|---|---|---|---|
| People's Party–Majorcan Union (PP–UM)^{1} | 4,100 | 42.28 | −18.56 | 10 | −4 |
| Socialist Party of the Balearic Islands (PSIB–PSOE) | 3,227 | 33.28 | +8.85 | 8 | +2 |
| Socialist Party of Mallorca–Nationalists of Majorca (PSM–NM) | 963 | 9.93 | +6.21 | 2 | +2 |
| Independents of Inca (INDI) | 538 | 5.55 | New | 1 | +1 |
| Democratic and Social Centre (CDS) | 340 | 3.51 | −3.03 | 0 | −1 |
| United Left (EU–IU) | 235 | 2.42 | −0.61 | 0 | ±0 |
| Balearic Convergence (CB) | 225 | 2.32 | New | 0 | ±0 |
| Blank ballots | 69 | 0.71 | −0.01 | | |
| Total | 9,697 | | | 21 | ±0 |
| Valid votes | 9,697 | 99.58 | +0.48 | | |
| Invalid votes | 41 | 0.42 | −0.48 | | |
| Votes cast / turnout | 9,738 | 64.70 | −9.91 | | |
| Abstentions | 5,313 | 35.30 | +9.91 | | |
| Registered voters | 15,051 | | | | |
Sources
Footnotes: ^{1} People's Party–Majorcan Union results are compared to the combined totals of People's Alliance–Liberal Party, Majorcan Union and People's Democratic Party in the 1987 election.

=== Llucmajor ===
Population: 17,977

← Summary of the 26 May 1991 City Council of Llucmajor election results →
| Parties and alliances | Popular vote | | | Seats | |
| Parties and alliances | Votes | % | ±pp | Total | +/− |
|---|---|---|---|---|---|
| People's Party–Majorcan Union (PP–UM)^{1} | 3,175 | 36.71 | −8.87 | 7 | −1 |
| Socialist Party of the Balearic Islands (PSIB–PSOE) | 2,899 | 33.52 | −6.39 | 7 | ±0 |
| Independent Social Group (ASI) | 1,502 | 17.37 | New | 3 | +3 |
| Socialist Party of Mallorca–Nationalists of Majorca (PSM–NM) | 432 | 5.00 | −0.38 | 0 | −1 |
| Balearic Convergence (CB) | 263 | 3.04 | New | 0 | ±0 |
| Democratic and Social Centre (CDS) | 215 | 2.49 | −3.67 | 0 | −1 |
| United Left (EU–IU) | 75 | 0.87 | −1.25 | 0 | ±0 |
| Blank ballots | 87 | 1.01 | +0.16 | | |
| Total | 8,648 | | | 17 | ±0 |
| Valid votes | 8,648 | 99.24 | +0.50 | | |
| Invalid votes | 66 | 0.76 | −0.50 | | |
| Votes cast / turnout | 8,714 | 66.30 | −2.56 | | |
| Abstentions | 4,429 | 33.70 | +2.56 | | |
| Registered voters | 13,143 | | | | |
Sources
Footnotes: ^{1} People's Party–Majorcan Union results are compared to the combined totals of People's Alliance–Liberal Party, Majorcan Union and People's Democratic Party in the 1987 election.

=== Manacor ===
Population: 28,791

← Summary of the 26 May 1991 City Council of Manacor election results →
| Parties and alliances | Popular vote | | | Seats | |
| Parties and alliances | Votes | % | ±pp | Total | +/− |
|---|---|---|---|---|---|
| People's Party–Majorcan Union (PP–UM)^{1} | 5,002 | 40.27 | −4.77 | 10 | ±0 |
| Socialist Party of the Balearic Islands (PSIB–PSOE) | 2,845 | 22.90 | −4.29 | 5 | −2 |
| Socialist Party of Mallorca–Independent Democratic Candidacy (PSM–CDI) | 1,449 | 11.67 | +0.42 | 3 | +1 |
| Balearic Convergence (CB) | 1,285 | 10.35 | New | 2 | +2 |
| Convergence of Manacor (CM) | 721 | 5.80 | New | 1 | +1 |
| Independent Union of Majorca–Independents of Majorca (UIM–IM) | 400 | 3.22 | New | 0 | ±0 |
| Democratic and Social Centre (CDS) | 385 | 3.10 | −7.01 | 0 | −2 |
| United Left (EU–IU) | 192 | 1.55 | −0.39 | 0 | ±0 |
| Blank ballots | 142 | 1.14 | +0.04 | | |
| Total | 12,421 | | | 21 | ±0 |
| Valid votes | 12,421 | 99.37 | +0.19 | | |
| Invalid votes | 79 | 0.63 | −0.19 | | |
| Votes cast / turnout | 12,500 | 57.70 | −6.01 | | |
| Abstentions | 9,165 | 42.30 | +6.01 | | |
| Registered voters | 21,665 | | | | |
Sources
Footnotes: ^{1} People's Party–Majorcan Union results are compared to the combined totals of People's Alliance–Liberal Party, Majorcan Union and People's Democratic Party in the 1987 election.

=== Maó-Mahón ===
Population: 24,383

← Summary of the 26 May 1991 City Council of Maó-Mahón election results →
| Parties and alliances | Popular vote | | | Seats | |
| Parties and alliances | Votes | % | ±pp | Total | +/− |
|---|---|---|---|---|---|
| Socialist Party of the Balearic Islands (PSIB–PSOE) | 4,823 | 45.91 | +4.05 | 11 | +2 |
| People's Party (PP)^{1} | 3,900 | 37.13 | +2.10 | 8 | ±0 |
| Agreement of the Left of Menorca (PSM–EU) | 1,261 | 12.00 | −0.17 | 2 | ±0 |
| Democratic and Social Centre (CDS) | 238 | 2.27 | −7.33 | 0 | −2 |
| Progressive Union of Menorca (UPdeM) | 112 | 1.07 | New | 0 | ±0 |
| Blank ballots | 171 | 1.63 | +0.29 | | |
| Total | 10,505 | | | 21 | ±0 |
| Valid votes | 10,505 | 99.59 | +1.33 | | |
| Invalid votes | 43 | 0.41 | −1.33 | | |
| Votes cast / turnout | 10,548 | 56.95 | −4.08 | | |
| Abstentions | 7,975 | 43.05 | +4.08 | | |
| Registered voters | 18,523 | | | | |
Sources
Footnotes: ^{1} People's Party (PP) results are compared to People's Alliance–Liberal Party totals in the 1987 election.

=== Palma de Mallorca ===
Population: 325,120

← Summary of the 26 May 1991 City Council of Palma de Mallorca election results →
| Parties and alliances | Popular vote | | | Seats | |
| Parties and alliances | Votes | % | ±pp | Total | +/− |
|---|---|---|---|---|---|
| People's Party–Majorcan Union (PP–UM)^{1} | 59,420 | 47.80 | +7.90 | 17 | +5 |
| Socialist Party of the Balearic Islands (PSIB–PSOE) | 37,936 | 30.52 | −7.93 | 10 | −2 |
| Socialist Party of Mallorca–Nationalists of Majorca (PSM–NM) | 7,352 | 5.91 | +1.76 | 2 | +2 |
| United Left (EU–IU) | 5,250 | 4.22 | +0.63 | 0 | ±0 |
| The Greens (EV) | 4,487 | 3.61 | New | 0 | ±0 |
| Independent Union of Majorca–Independents of Majorca (UIM–IM) | 3,589 | 2.89 | New | 0 | ±0 |
| Democratic and Social Centre (CDS) | 2,933 | 2.36 | −9.48 | 0 | −3 |
| Balearic Convergence (CB) | 995 | 0.80 | New | 0 | ±0 |
| Alliance for the Republic (AR) | 477 | 0.38 | New | 0 | ±0 |
| Spanish Phalanx of the CNSO (FE–JONS) | 310 | 0.25 | New | 0 | ±0 |
| Balearic Radical Party (PRB) | 202 | 0.16 | New | 0 | ±0 |
| Blank ballots | 1,350 | 1.09 | −0.16 | | |
| Total | 124,301 | | | 29 | +2 |
| Valid votes | 124,301 | 99.37 | +1.14 | | |
| Invalid votes | 782 | 0.63 | −1.14 | | |
| Votes cast / turnout | 125,083 | 51.22 | −10.48 | | |
| Abstentions | 119,126 | 48.78 | +10.48 | | |
| Registered voters | 244,209 | | | | |
Sources
Footnotes: ^{1} People's Party–Majorcan Union results are compared to the combined totals of People's Alliance–Liberal Party, Majorcan Union and People's Democratic Party in the 1987 election.

=== Santa Eulària des Riu ===
Population: 17,615

← Summary of the 26 May 1991 City Council of Santa Eulària des Riu election results →
| Parties and alliances | Popular vote | | | Seats | |
| Parties and alliances | Votes | % | ±pp | Total | +/− |
|---|---|---|---|---|---|
| People's Party (PP)^{1} | 4,026 | 61.29 | −7.71 | 12 | −1 |
| Socialist Party of the Balearic Islands (PSIB–PSOE) | 1,607 | 24.46 | +1.78 | 4 | ±0 |
| Independents of Ibiza and Formentera Federation (FIEF) | 415 | 6.32 | New | 1 | +1 |
| Nationalist and Ecologist Agreement (ENE) | 237 | 3.61 | New | 0 | ±0 |
| United Left (EU–IU) | 181 | 2.76 | +0.10 | 0 | ±0 |
| Left Unitary Platform (PCE (m–l)–CRPE) | 60 | 0.91 | New | 0 | ±0 |
| Blank ballots | 43 | 0.65 | −0.04 | | |
| Total | 6,569 | | | 17 | ±0 |
| Valid votes | 6,569 | 99.56 | +0.39 | | |
| Invalid votes | 29 | 0.44 | −0.39 | | |
| Votes cast / turnout | 6,598 | 55.53 | −6.87 | | |
| Abstentions | 5,283 | 44.47 | +6.87 | | |
| Registered voters | 11,881 | | | | |
Sources
Footnotes: ^{1} People's Party (PP) results are compared to People's Alliance–Liberal Party totals in the 1987 election.

== See also ==
- 1991 Balearic regional election
