= General elections in Spain =

General elections in Spain are the elections in which the citizens of Spain choose members of the Congress of Deputies and of the Senate, the two chambers of the Cortes Generales that represent the Spanish people. They are held every four years, unless a repeat or early election is called. Since the adoption of the Constitution of 1978, 14 general elections have been held in Spain. The most recent elections were held in July of 2023. Members of the Congress of Deputies are elected via a system of proportional representation. Members of the Senate are elected via a mixed system: some are elected via a majoritarian system and others are appointed by the legislatures of autonomous communities.

== Call for elections ==
The Cortes Generales comprise the Congress of Deputies (lower chamber) and the Senate (upper chamber). Elections to the Cortes Generales are held every four years, or before in the case of early elections. The prime minister can dissolve the legislature and call for early elections at any time, provided that at least one year has passed since the prior election and a motion of no confidence is not in progress. The formal convocation of elections is effected by a proposal from the prime minister, after deliberation by the Council of Ministers, and is decreed by the king. The Spanish constitution allows elections for the Congress of Deputies and the Senate to be held on different days; nevertheless, they have so far always been held at the same time. The electoral law requires that general elections be held 54 calendar days after the publication of the writs in the Boletín Oficial del Estado. The electoral campaign lasts for fifteen days. An election silence during a "day of reflection" is imposed on the day before the elections.

== Active suffrage ==
All Spanish citizens of the age of majority can vote in general elections, whether residing in Spain or abroad. Spaniards permanently residing abroad must be registered on the Electoral Census of Absent Residents (CERA) and make a request to be able to vote, a system known as requested vote. CERA registrees vote in consulates, by mail, or in person. Spaniards residing in Spain who are temporarily out of the country must be registered as Temporarily Absent Resident Spaniards (ERTA) and also must request the vote. ERTA registrees vote in their usual district in Spain by mail.

Convicted criminals whose final judicial sentence includes deprivation of suffrage rights cannot vote in elections. Until 2018, those declared incompetent by virtue of a final judicial sentence, and those confined to a psychiatric hospital by judicial authority, also could not vote. In 2018, the election law was changed to eliminate this restriction, permitting 100,000 individuals with intellectual disabilities to vote in elections.

== Passive suffrage ==
All Spaniards who have attained the age of majority are eligible to be candidates in a general election, provided that they are qualified to vote and do not meet any of the criteria for ineligibility: members of the royal family, of the Constitutional Court, of the Supreme Court, of the Council of State, of the Nuclear Safety Council, of the military or police (active), of an electoral commission, the Defender of the People, the Attorney General, government appointees, the president of Radio Televisión Española, the governor of the Bank of Spain, judges, prosecutors, and those sentenced to imprisonment by a final conviction, among others.

As of the general-election law reform of 2007, candidate campaigns must present gender-balanced electoral lists, so that each gender, male and female, comprises at least 40% of the list. This reform was appealed by the Popular Parliamentary Group of the Congress of Deputies before the Constitutional Court, which in 2008 affirmed that the reform was constitutional.

Following the general-election law reform of 2011, parties without representation in the Congress or Senate must collect signatures of voters endorsing their candidacies in order to run in the general election, in addition to other requirements. The political parties need 0.1% of the signatures of the voter population of each constitutuency. Groupings of electors need at least 1% of signatures. Each citizen may only sign for one candidacy.

Deputies by constituency assigned for the general elections of 2019

The Spanish Constitution requires that the Congress of Deputies by elected by free, equal, direct, secret, universal suffrage. Deputies are elected via proportional representation (with first-past-the-post voting in Ceuta and Melilla), with closed lists in each electoral constituency. The Constitution specifies that the Congress of Deputies must have a minimum of 300 and a maximum of 400 members. The current number is 350 deputies, by the determination of the Organic General Election Regime Law approved in 1985.

There are 52 electoral constituencies for the Congress of Deputies, which correspond to the fifty provinces of Spain plus the autonomous cities of Ceuta and Melilla. According to Spanish electoral law, the number of seats in each constituency can change in each election and it is specified when writs of election are issued. Each constituency is guaranteed a minimum allocation of two seats, and one seat each for Ceuta and Melilla for a total of 102 seats. The remaining 248 seats are allocated proportionally according to population using the Hare quota.

Consequently, in the November 2019 general election, the number of deputies in each constituency ranged from 1 deputy each in the constituencies of Ceuta and Melilla, up to 37 in the constituency of Madrid.

After the holding of a general election, seats are assigned to the electoral lists in each constituency. For that distribution, the D'Hondt method is used in each constituency separately. Also, there is an electoral threshold of 3%, i.e. a party must obtain at least 3% of the valid vote total (Note: Blank votes are considered valid votes; null votes are not.) in the constituency in order to select a share of the seats. Regardless, this threshold only has real-life application in constituencies of great size, such as Madrid or Barcelona. In the entire democratic period, this exclusion clause has only been applied once, in 1993 with the Democratic and Social Centre, that had obtained 2.99% of the votes cast in the province of Madrid and would have sent a deputy if the electoral threshold had not existed.

Underrepresented (in red) and overrepresented (in blue) constituencies in the 2016 general election.

The system of distribution of Congress of Deputies seats to the provinces leads to less populous provinces being overrepresented, because they are assigned more seats than they would receive if seats were distributed strictly in proportion to the population of each province. In the same way, highly populated provinces are underrepresented.

The system also tends to favor the large political parties. Despite the use of a proportional representation system, which in general facilitates the emergence of many small parties rather than a few large parties, the electoral system for the Congress of Deputies in practice favors the creation of a two-party system. There are several reasons for this:

- Due to the great population disparity between the provinces, and despite the fact that small provinces are overrepresented, the number of deputies assigned to each of them is small, and their seats tend to go to one of the two major parties.
- The electoral threshold of 3% only affects provinces that elect more than 30 deputies, i.e. Madrid and Barcelona. In the other constituencies, where fewer seats are distributed, the real barrier to entry into the Congress is significantly greater. For example, the effective barrier in provinces with three seats is 25%.
- The median number of seats per constituency is one of the lowest in Europe. This is due to the use of Spain's provinces as electoral constituencies, which leads to a large number of constituencies. As a consequence, the number of wasted votes is quite high. That is to say, there are a large number of votes that cannot affect the result, because they have been cast for some small party that does not achieve representation in the constituency where those votes were cast.
- The D'Hondt method used to distribute seats slightly favors larger parties, compared to other electoral methods, such as the Webster/Sainte-Laguë method or largest remainder method. Regardless, the influence of the D'Hondt method in the bipolarization of the electoral system is quite limited.
- The size of the Congress of Deputies is relatively small, which can lead to disproportionality and favor large parties.

== Senate ==
The Spanish Constitution provides that the Senate be composed of a variable number of senators, elected by a mixed system. In the 14th Legislature, the Senate is composed of 265 senators: 208 from direct election and 57 appointees. The number of directly elected senators is fixed, while the number of appointed senators varies as a function of the population.

=== Directly elected senators ===
Directly elected senators, by constituency

The Spanish Constitution requires that directly elected senators be elected by free, equal, direct, secret, universal suffrage. The directly elected members of the Senate are elected by multiple non-transferable vote (first-past-the-post voting in the minor istlands), with open lists in each electoral constituency. The Constitution fixes the number of senators in each constituency, resulting in a total of 208 total senators chosen by direct election .

There are 59 electoral constituencies for the Senate, which correspond to the 46 Spanish peninsular provinces, plus 10 corresponding to islands and two for the autonomous cities of Ceuta and Melilla. Four senators are allocated to each peninsular province, three to each of the major islands (Gran Canaria, Mallorca and Tenerife), one to each of the minor islands (Ibiza, Formentera, Menorca, Fuerteventura, La Gomera, El Hierro, Lanzarote y La Palma), and two senators to each of the autonomous cities of Ceuta and Melilla.

=== Appointed senators ===
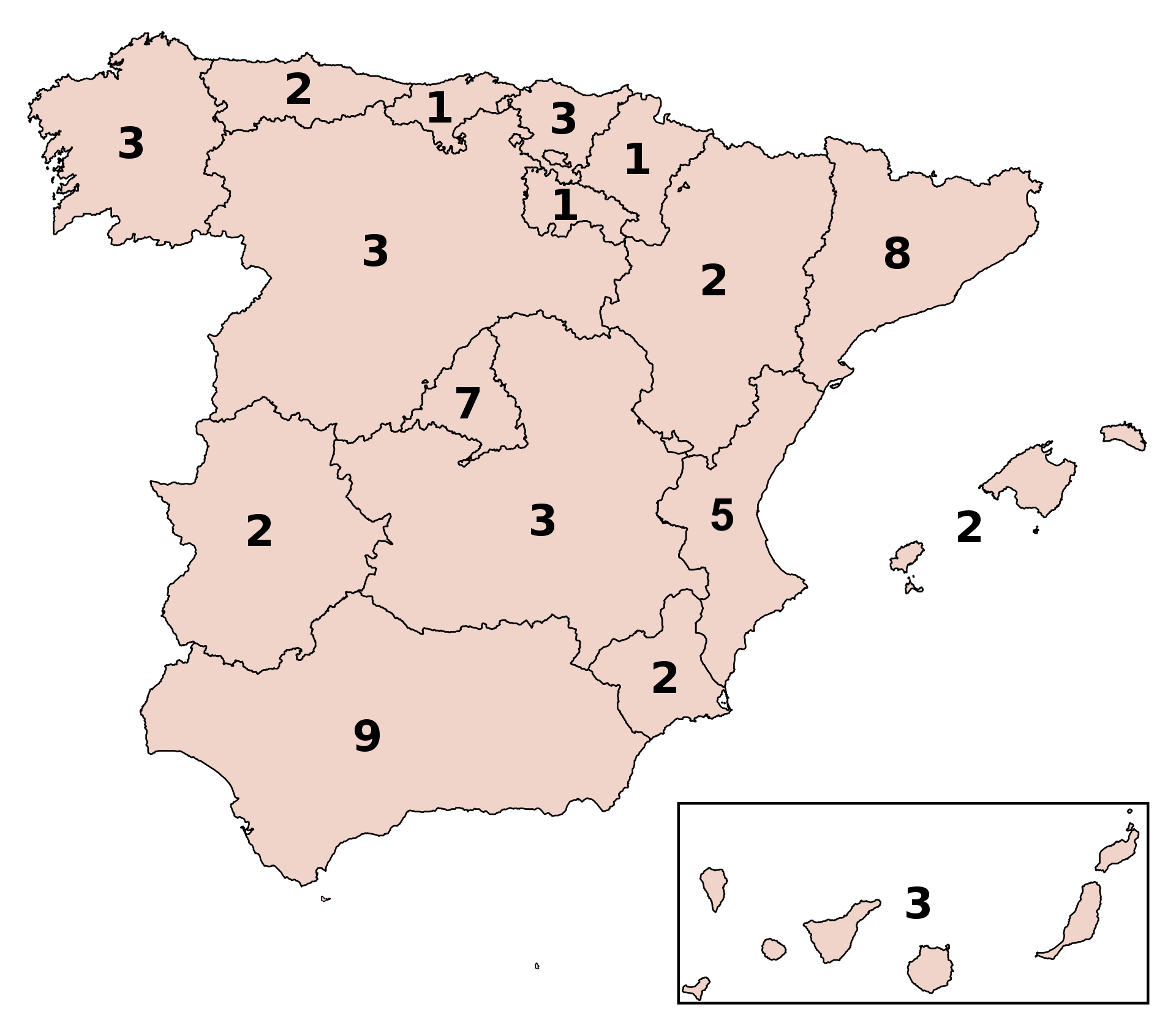
Appointed senators per autonomous community in the 14th Cortes Generales

Senators appointed by the autonomous communities are chosen by their legislative assemblies. The number of appointed senators varies in proportion to each community's population. Each autonomous community is allocated one initial senator, plus one more for every million inhabitants in its territory. At the end of each legislative session, the Permanent Deputation of the Senate determines the number of senators to be appointed in the new legislature. In the 14th Cortes Generales, there are 57 appointed senators.

The selection of appointed senators is verified with respect to a criterion of attenuated majority representation, which gives primacies to the parties and coalitions with the most votes.

| Autonomous Community | Appointed senators |
|---|---|
| Andalucía | 9 |
| Aragón | 2 |
| Canarias | 3 |
| Cantabria | 1 |
| Castilla y Léon | 3 |
| Castilla - La Mancha | 3 |
| Cataluña | 8 |
| Comunidad de Madrid | 7 |
| Comunidad Foral de Navarra | 1 |
| Comunidad Valenciana | 5 |
| Extremadura | 2 |
| Galicia | 3 |
| Islas Baleares | 2 |
| La Rioja | 1 |
| País Vasco | 3 |
| Principado de Asturias | 2 |
| Región de Murcia | 2 |
| Senadores en total | 57 |

== Results ==
The results of the general elections held in Spain since the passage of the Spanish Constitution in 1978. Voter participation and the majority party in elections to the Congress of Deputies and the Senate are shown. There have been 15 general elections held since 1978. The elections with the greatest participation were in 1982, and those with the least participation in November 2019.

| Election | Voter participation | Congress of Deputies | | Senate | | Elected Prime Minister | |
| Election | Voter participation | Winning party | Seats | Winning party | Seats | Candidate | Votes |
|---|---|---|---|---|---|---|---|
| 1979 | 67.43% | UCD | 168/350 | UCD | 118/208 | Adolfo Suárez (UCD) | 183/350: UCD (168); CD (8); PSA–PA (5); PAR (1); UPN (1) |
| 1982 | 79.97% | PSOE | 202/350 | PSOE | 134/208 | Felipe González (PSOE) | 207/350: PSOE (200); PCE (4); CDS (2); EE (1) |
| 1986 | 70.49% | PSOE | 184/350 | PSOE | 124/208 | Felipe González (PSOE) | 184/350: PSOE (184) |
| 1989 | 69.74% | PSOE | 175/350 | PSOE | 107/208 | Felipe González (PSOE) | 167/350: PSOE (166); AIC (1) |
| 1993 | 76.44% | PSOE | 159/350 | PSOE | 96/208 | Felipe González (PSOE) | 181/350: PSOE (159); CiU (17); PNV (5) |
| 1996 | 77.38% | PP | 156/350 | PP | 112/208 | José María Aznar (PP) | 181/350: PP (156); CiU (16); PNV (5); CC (4) |
| 2000 | 68.71% | PP | 183/350 | PP | 127/208 | José María Aznar (PP) | 202/350: PP (183); CiU (15); CC (4) |
| 2004 | 75.66% | PSOE | 164/350 | PP | 102/208 | José Luis Rodríguez Zapatero (PSOE) | 183/350: PSOE (164); ERC (8); IU–ICV (5); CC (3); BNG (2); CHA (1) |
| 2008 | 73.85% | PSOE | 169/350 | PP | 101/208 | José Luis Rodríguez Zapatero (PSOE) | 169/350: PSOE (169) |
| 2011 | 68.94% | PP | 186/350 | PP | 136/208 | Mariano Rajoy (PP) | 187/350: PP (185); FAC (1); UPN (1) |
| 2015 | 69.67% | PP | 123/350 | PP | 124/208 | No elected government | |
| 2016 | 66.48% | PP | 137/350 | PP | 130/208 | Mariano Rajoy (PP) | 170/350: PP (134); C's (32); UPN (2); CCa (1); FAC (1) |
| 2019 (April) | 71.76% | PSOE | 123/350 | PSOE | 123/208 | No elected government | |
| 2019 (November) | 66.20% | PSOE | 120/350 | PSOE | 92/208 | Pedro Sánchez (PSOE) | 167/350: PSOE (120); UP–ECP–GeC (35); PNV (6); Más País (2); Compromís (1); NCa (1); BNG (1); ¡TE! (1) |
| 2023 | 66.59% | PP | 137/350 | PP | 120/208 | Pedro Sánchez (PSOE) | 179/350: PSOE (121); Sumar (31); ERC (7); Junts (7); EH Bildu (6); PNV (5); BNG (1); CCa (1) |

== See also ==
- Elections in Spain

== Bibliography ==
- Álvarez Rivera, Manuel (24 July 2016). "Recursos Electorales en la Internet: Elecciones al Congreso de los Diputados de España".
- Colomer, Josep M. (2004). The Handbook of Electoral System Choice. Nueva York: Palgrave Macmillan. ISBN 978-1-4039-0454-6.
- "The Spanish Constitution" (PDF). Agencia Estatal Boletín Oficial del Estado [National Agency of the Official State Gazette]. 1978.
- Heywood, Paul (1999). Politics and Policy in Democratic Spain: No Longer Different?. Londres: Frank Cass Publishers. ISBN 0-7146-4910-4.
- Electoral System Act [Régimen Electoral General] (Organic Law 5/1985) (in Spanish). Agencia Estatal Boletín Oficial del Estado. 19 June 1985.
- Jefatura del Estado (3 May 2016). Real Decreto 184/2016, de 3 de mayo, de disolución del Congreso de los Diputados y del Senado y de convocatoria de elecciones. ISSN 0212-033X. BOE-A-2016-4280.
- Oliver Araujo, Joan (2011). Los sistemas electorales autonómicos (PDF). Generalitat de Catalunya. Institut d’Estudis Autonòmics. ISBN 978-84-393-8793-0.
- OSCE/ODIHR (17 February 2012). "Spain, Early Parliamentary Elections, 20 November 2011: Final Report" (PDF). Warsaw: Organization for Security and Co-operation in Europe Office for Democratic Institutions and Human Rights.
