= 2007 Balearic regional election =

Election in the Spanish region of the Balearic Islands

- 27 May 2007

All 59 seats in the Parliament of the Balearic Islands 30 seats needed for a majority
- Opinion polls
- Registered: 699,947 ▲2.5%
- Turnout: 420,941 (60.1%) ▼2.7 pp
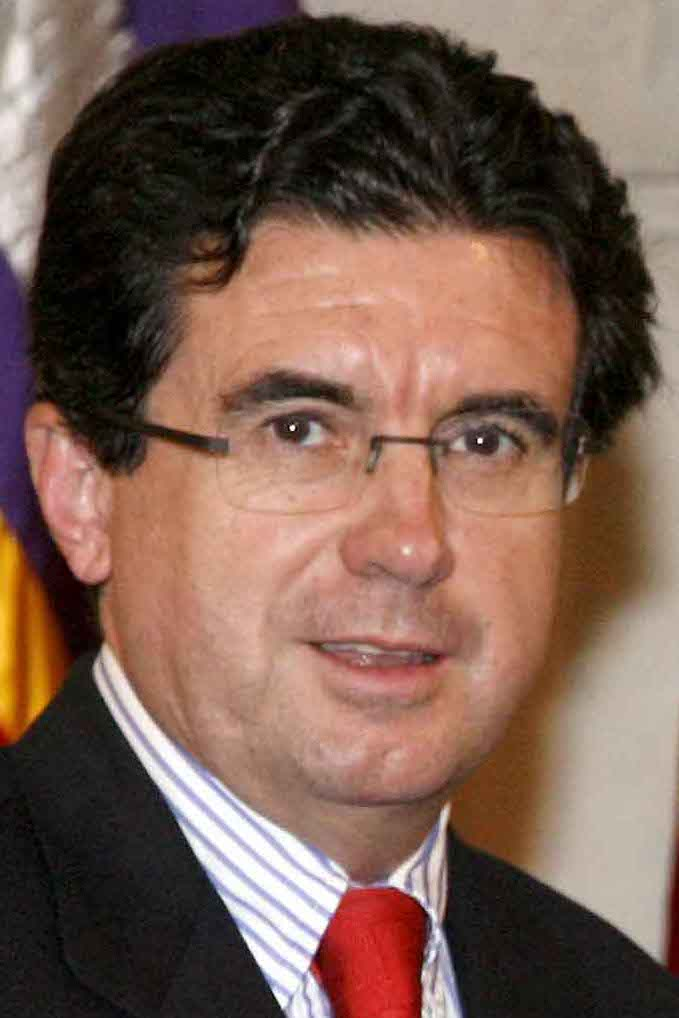

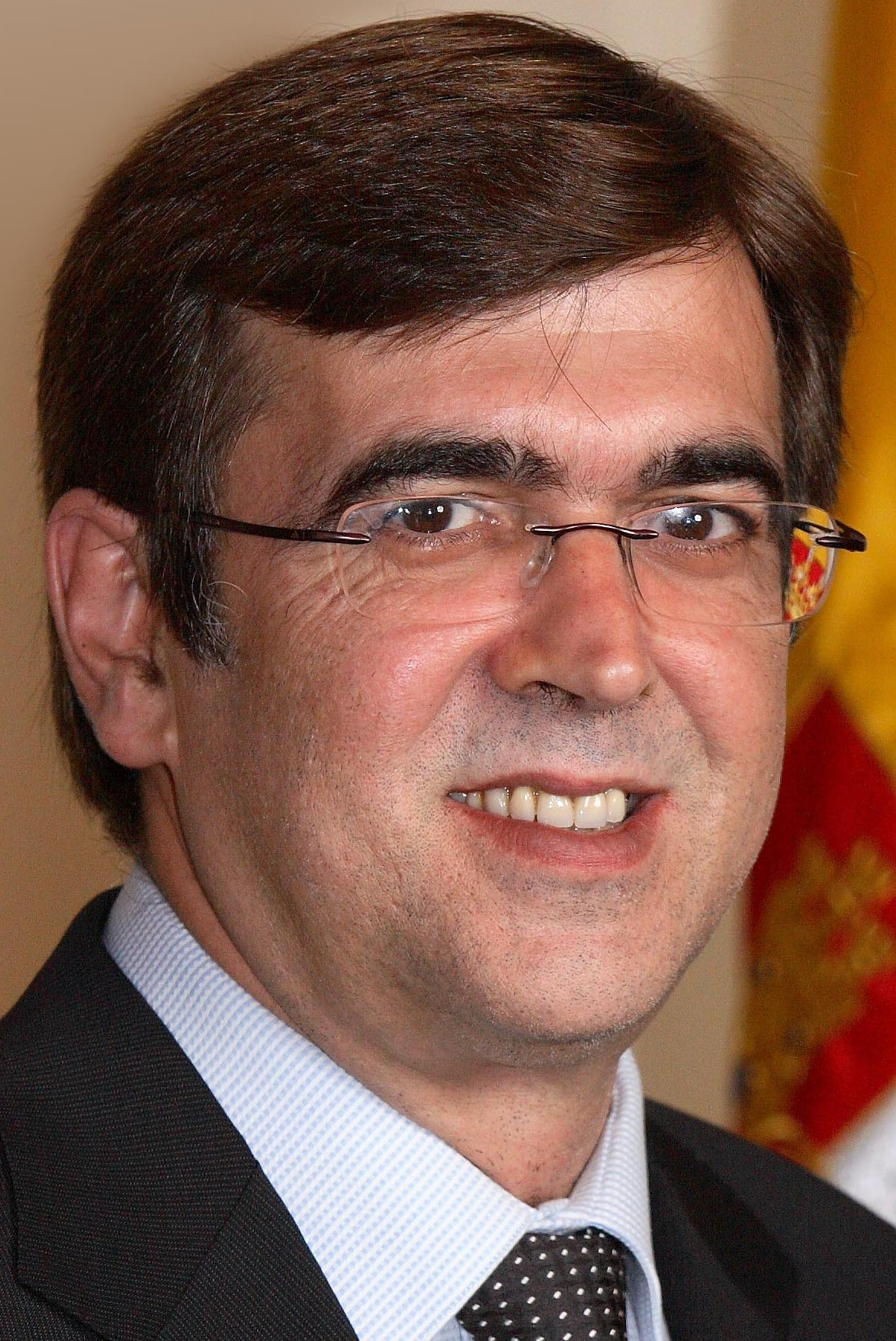

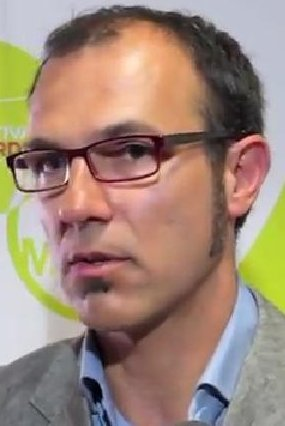

	First party	Second party	Third party
Leader	Jaume Matas	Francesc Antich	Xico Tarrés
Party	PP	PSIB–PSOE	PSOE–ExC
Leader since	17 June 1996	9 November 1998	2007
Leader's seat	Mallorca	Mallorca	Ibiza
Last election	29 seats, 44.7%	15 seats, 24.5%	5 seats, 4.0% (Note: Results for Pacte (3.6%, 5 seats) and EV–Eiv (0.3%, 0 seats) in the 2003 election.)
Seats won	28	16	6
Seat change	▼1	▲1	▲1
Popular vote	192,577	115,477	19,094
Percentage	46.0%	27.6%	4.6%
Swing	▲1.3 pp	▲3.1 pp	▲0.6 pp
	Fourth party	Fifth party	Sixth party
Leader	Biel Barceló	Maria Antònia Munar	Eduard Riudavets
Party	Bloc	UM	PSM–EN
Leader since	27 May 2006	1 July 1991	2003
Leader's seat	Mallorca	Mallorca	Menorca
Last election	5 seats, 12.1% (Note: Results for PSM–EN (7.3%, 3 seats), EU–EV (4.5%, 2 seats) and ERC (0.4%, 0 seats) in the 2003 election.)	3 seats, 7.5%	1 seat, 0.7%
Seats won	4	3	1
Seat change	▼1	0	0
Popular vote	37,572	28,178	3,292
Percentage	9.0%	6.7%	0.8%
Swing	▼3.1 pp	▼0.8 pp	▲0.1 pp
	Seventh party
Leader	Josep Mayans Serra
Party	AIPF
Leader since	2003
Leader's seat	Formentera
Last election	1 seat, 0.4%
Seats won	1
Seat change	0
Popular vote	1,795
Percentage	0.4%
Swing	0.0 pp
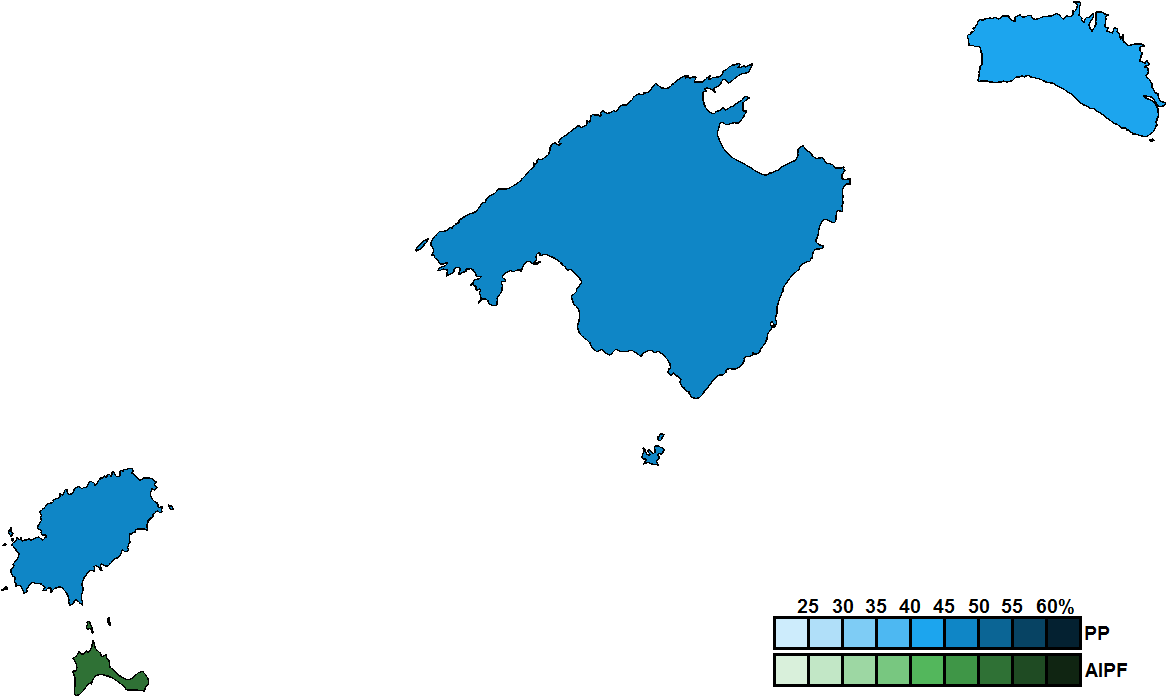
- Constituency results map for the Parliament of the Balearic Islands
President before election
Jaume Matas
PP
President after election
Francesc Antich
PSOE

A regional election was held in the Balearic Islands on 27 May 2007 to elect the 7th Parliament of the autonomous community. All 59 seats in the Parliament were up for election. It was held concurrently with regional elections in twelve other autonomous communities and local elections all across Spain.

On 1 March 2007, the reform of the Statute of Autonomy of the Balearic Islands came into effect. Among other changes, it gave more autonomy to every Island Council, with the creation of the Island Council of Formentera (formerly the Island Council of Ibiza and Formentera covered both islands), composed by the municipal councillors elected in the Formentera municipal election. This meant that to elect the island councillors a separate election was held for the first time. Since then, the regional election in every district was used to determine the councillors. The number of seats was the same as before—33 for Mallorca, 13 for Menorca and 13 for Ibiza.

== Overview ==
Under the 2007 Statute of Autonomy, the Parliament of the Balearic Islands was the unicameral legislature of the homonymous autonomous community, having legislative power in devolved matters, as well as the ability to grant or withdraw confidence from a regional president. The electoral and procedural rules were supplemented by national law provisions.

=== Date ===
The term of the Parliament of the Balearic Islands expired four years after the date of its previous election. Amendments earlier in 2007 abolished fixed-term elections, instead allowing the term of the Parliament to expire after an early dissolution. The election decree was required to be issued no later than 25 days before the scheduled expiration date of parliament and published on the following day in the Official Gazette of the Balearic Islands (BOIB), with election day taking place 54 days after the decree's publication. The previous election was held on 25 May 2003, which meant that the chamber's term would have expired on 25 May 2007. The election decree was required to be published in the BOIB no later than 1 May 2007, setting the latest possible date for election day on 24 June 2007.

The regional president was granted the prerogative to dissolve the Parliament of the Balearic Islands at any given time and call a snap election, provided that no motion of no confidence was in process and that dissolution did not occur before one year after a previous one under this procedure. In the event of an investiture process failing to elect a regional president within a 60-day period from the first ballot, the Parliament was to be automatically dissolved and a fresh election called.

The Parliament of the Balearic Islands was officially dissolved on 2 April 2007 with the publication of the corresponding decree in the BOIB, setting election day for 27 May.

=== Electoral system ===
Voting for the Parliament was based on universal suffrage, comprising all Spanish nationals over 18 years of age, registered in the Balearic Islands and with full political rights, provided that they had not been deprived of the right to vote by a final sentence, nor were legally incapacitated.

The Parliament of the Balearic Islands had 59 seats. All were elected in four multi-member constituencies—corresponding to the islands of Mallorca, Menorca, Ibiza and Formentera, each of which was assigned a fixed number of seats—using the D'Hondt method and closed-list proportional voting, with a five percent-threshold of valid votes (including blank ballots) in each constituency. The use of this electoral method resulted in a higher effective threshold depending on district magnitude and vote distribution.

As a result of the aforementioned allocation, each Parliament constituency was entitled the following seats:

Seats	Constituencies
33	Mallorca
13	Menorca
12	Ibiza
1	Formentera

The law did not provide for by-elections to fill vacant seats; instead, any vacancies arising after the proclamation of candidates and during the legislative term were filled by the next candidates on the party lists or, when required, by designated substitutes.

=== Outgoing parliament ===
The table below shows the composition of the parliamentary groups in the chamber at the time of dissolution.

Parliamentary composition in April 2007
Groups	Parties	Legislators	
Groups	Parties	Seats	Total
People's Parliamentary Group	PP	29	29
Socialist Parliamentary Group	PSIB–PSOE	18	19
Socialist Parliamentary Group	Pacte	1	19
PSM–EN Parliamentary Group	PSM	3	4
PSM–EN Parliamentary Group	PSMe	1	4
United Left–The Greens Parliamentary Group	EUIB	2	3
United Left–The Greens Parliamentary Group	EV	1	3
Mixed Parliamentary Group	UM	3	4
Mixed Parliamentary Group	AIPF	1	4

== Parties and candidates ==
The electoral law allowed for parties and federations registered in the interior ministry, alliances and groupings of electors to present lists of candidates. Parties and federations intending to form an alliance were required to inform the relevant electoral commission within 10 days of the election call, whereas groupings of electors needed to secure the signature of at least one percent of the electorate in the constituencies for which they sought election, disallowing electors from signing for more than one list. Amendments earlier in 2007 required a balanced composition of men and women in the electoral lists, so that candidates of either sex made up at least 40 percent of the total composition.

Below is a list of the main parties and alliances which contested the election:

Candidacy	Parties and alliances	Leading candidate	Ideology	Previous result		Gov.	Ref.
Candidacy	Parties and alliances	Leading candidate	Ideology	Vote %	Seats	Gov.	Ref.
PP	List: People's Party (PP)	Jaume Matas	Conservatism; Christian democracy	44.7%	29	Yes	
PSIB–PSOE	List: Socialist Party of the Balearic Islands (PSIB–PSOE)	Francesc Antich	Social democracy	24.5%	15	No	
Bloc	List: Socialist Party of Mallorca (PSM); United Left of the Balearic Islands (EUIB) (Note: In Mallorca.); The Greens of the Balearic Islands (EVIB); Republican Left of Catalonia (ERC)	Biel Barceló	Left-wing nationalism Socialism; Environmentalism	12.1%	5	No	
PSOE–ExC	List: Socialist Party of the Balearic Islands (PSIB–PSOE) (Note: In Ibiza.); Ibiza for Change (ExC) – United Left of Ibiza (IU) – The Greens of Ibiza (EV–Eiv) – Nationalist and Ecologist Agreement (ENE) – Republican Left of Catalonia (ERC)	Xico Tarrés	Socialism; Ecologism	4.0%	5	No	
UM	List: Majorcan Union (UM)	Maria Antònia Munar	Regionalism; Liberalism	7.5%	3	No	
PSM–EN	List: Socialist Party of Menorca (PSM); The Greens of Menorca (EV–Me)	Eduard Riudavets	Left-wing nationalism Democratic socialism Environmentalism	0.7%	1	No	
AIPF	List: Independent Popular Council of Formentera (AIPF)	José Mayans Serra	Conservatism	0.4%	1	Yes	
GxF	List: People for Formentera (GxF); Socialist Party of the Balearic Islands (PSIB–PSOE) (Note: In Formentera.); United Left of the Balearic Islands (EUIB)	Miquel Ferrer	Environmentalism; Democratic socialism	0.3% (Note: Results for COP in the 2003 election.)	0	No	

== Opinion polls ==
The tables below list opinion polling results in reverse chronological order, showing the most recent first and using the dates when the survey fieldwork was done, as opposed to the date of publication. Where the fieldwork dates are unknown, the date of publication is given instead. The highest percentage figure in each polling survey is displayed with its background shaded in the leading party's colour. If a tie ensues, this is applied to the figures with the highest percentages. The "Lead" column on the right shows the percentage-point difference between the parties with the highest percentages in a poll.

=== Voting intention estimates ===
The table below lists weighted voting intention estimates. Refusals are generally excluded from the party vote percentages, while question wording and the treatment of "don't know" responses and those not intending to vote may vary between polling organisations. When available, seat projections determined by the polling organisations are displayed below (or in place of) the percentages in a smaller font; 30 seats were required for an absolute majority in the Parliament of the Balearic Islands.

Color key:

Exit poll

Polling firm/Commissioner	Fieldwork date	Sample size	Turnout	PP	PSIB–PSOE	UM	PSM	EUIB	Pacte/ ExC	PSMe	EM	AIPF	GxF	PIB	Bloc	Lead
2007 regional election	27 May 2007	—N/a	60.1	46.0; 28	27.6; 16	6.7; 3	(Note: Within Bloc.)		4.6; 6	0.8; 1	0.4; 0	0.4; 1	0.3; 0	–	9.0; 4	18.4
Ipsos/RTVE–FORTA	27 May 2007	?	?	? 25/28	? 22/25	? 2/3			(Note: Within PSIB–PSOE.)	–	–	(Note: Within PP.)		–	? 3/4	?
Sigma Dos/El Mundo	20 May 2007	?	?	46.7; 30	32.1; 21/22	4.9; 2				? 1	? 0/1			–	9.9; 4	14.6
Opina/El País	14–17 May 2007	?	?	47.5; 27/28	34.0; 24	5.5; 1				–	–			–	10.5; 6/7	13.5
Celeste-Tel/Terra	9–15 May 2007	?	?	43.1; 28/29	30.1; 20/21	5.9; 2/3	6.8; 2/3	4.9; 0	(Note: Within PSM–EN.)		(Note: Within EUIB.)			–	4.4; 5/6	13.0
Opina/Cadena SER	12 May 2007	1,200	?	44.5; 26/27	35.0; 23/24	3.5; 1				–	–			–	14.0; 8	9.5
CIS	9 Apr–6 May 2007	1,198	?	42.5; 27	23.7; 14/15	8.1; 3			6.1; 7	0.8; 1	0.6; 0/1	0.4; 1	0.3; 0	–	13.2; 6	18.8
Grup Marest/Prensa Ibérica	20–26 Apr 2007	1,800	?	43.5; 27	25.6; 16	8.4; 3			? 6	1.0; 1	–	? 0/1	? 0/1	–	13.5; 5	17.9
Sigma Dos/El Mundo	19–24 Apr 2007	1,050	?	46.8; 30/31	30.4; 20/22	5.3; 2				0.7; 1	0.5; 0/1			–	10.9; 4	16.4
Grup Marest/Prensa Ibérica	20–30 Mar 2007	1,813	?	42.3; 26	27.4; 16	7.4; 3			? 7	? 1	–	? 0/1	? 0/1	–	13.0; 5	14.9
Sigma Dos/El Mundo	16–24 Nov 2006	?	?	? 30/32	? 17/18	? 1/2	? 2/3	? 1	? 5/6					–	–	?
Sigma Dos/El Mundo	28 May 2006	?	?	46.1; 29/31	28.0; 17/18	4.4; 1/2	? 3/4	? 0/1	? 5/6					–	–	18.1
2004 EP election	13 Jun 2004	—N/a	37.6	46.6	38.8	3.1	3.6	2.4	–	–		–	–	–	–	7.8
2004 general election	14 Mar 2004	—N/a	68.8	45.9	39.5	2.2	(Note: Within Progressives for the Balearic Islands.)		–			–	–	8.6	–	6.4
2003 regional election	25 May 2003	—N/a	62.8	44.7; 29	24.5; 15	7.5; 3	7.3; 3	4.5; 2	3.6; 5	0.7; 1	0.4; 0	0.4; 1	0.3; 0	–	–	20.2

== Results ==
=== Overall ===
← Summary of the 27 May 2007 Parliament of the Balearic Islands election results →
Parties and alliances	Popular vote			Seats	
Parties and alliances	Votes	%	±pp	Total	+/−
People's Party (PP)	192,577	46.02	+1.32	28	−1
Socialist Party of the Balearic Islands (PSIB–PSOE)	115,477	27.60	+3.06	16	+1
Bloc for Mallorca (PSM–EN, EU–EV, ERC)^{1}	37,572	8.98	−3.14	4	−1
Majorcan Union (UM)	28,178	6.73	−0.72	3	±0
PSOE–Ibiza for Change (PSOE–ExC)^{2}	19,094	4.56	+0.61	6	+1
PSM–Nationalist Agreement–The Greens of Menorca (PSM–EN, EV–Me)^{3}	3,292	0.79	+0.10	1	±0
Independent Social Group (ASI)	1,921	0.46	−1.11	0	±0
Independent Popular Council of Formentera (AIPF)	1,795	0.43	+0.05	1	±0
Left of Menorca–United Left (EM–EU)^{4}	1,728	0.41	±0.00	0	±0
PSOE+People for Formentera (PSOE+GxF)^{5}	1,456	0.35	+0.05	0	±0
Citizens for Blank Votes (CenB)	1,216	0.29	+0.19	0	±0
European Green Group (GVE)	876	0.21	+0.12	0	±0
Balearic Party (PB)	802	0.19	New	0	±0
Balearic People's Union (UPB)	689	0.16	+0.13	0	±0
Union of Centrists of Menorca (UCM)	686	0.16	−0.10	0	±0
Pityusic Democracy (DP)	675	0.16	New	0	±0
Key of Mallorca (Clau)	546	0.13	−0.58	0	±0
Workers for Democracy Coalition (TD)	543	0.13	+0.03	0	±0
Islander Party of the Balearic Islands (PIIB)	366	0.09	New	0	±0
Civic Union (UC)	342	0.08	−0.10	0	±0
Blank ballots	8,613	2.06	+0.40		
Total	418,444			59	±0
Valid votes	418,444	99.41	+0.06		
Invalid votes	2,497	0.59	−0.06		
Votes cast / turnout	420,941	60.14	−2.70		
Abstentions	279,006	39.86	+2.70		
Registered voters	699,947				
Sources
Footnotes: ^{1} Bloc for Mallorca results are compared to the combined totals of Socialist Party of Mallorca–Nationalist Agreement, United Left–The Greens in the island of Mallorca and Republican Left of Catalonia in the 2003 election.; ^{2} PSOE–Ibiza for Change results are compared to the combined totals of Progressive Pact and The Greens of Ibiza in the 2003 election.; ^{3} PSM–Nationalist Agreement–The Greens of Menorca results are compared to the combined totals of Socialist Party of Menorca–Nationalist Agreement and The Greens of Menorca in the 2003 election.; ^{4} Left of Menorca–United Left results are compared to United Left–The Greens totals in the island of Menorca in the 2003 election.; ^{5} PSOE+People for Formentera results are compared to Coalition of Progressive Organizations totals in the 2003 election.

Popular vote
PP	46.02%
PSIB–PSOE	27.60%
Bloc	8.98%
UM	6.73%
PSOE–ExC	4.56%
PSM–EN	0.79%
AIPF	0.43%
Others	2.83%
Blank ballots	2.06%

Seats
PP	47.46%
PSIB–PSOE	27.12%
PSOE–ExC	10.17%
Bloc	6.78%
UM	5.08%
PSM–EN	1.69%
AIPF	1.69%

=== Distribution by constituency ===
Constituency	PP		PSIB		Bloc		UM		PSOE–ExC		PSM–EN		AIPF	
Constituency	%	S	%	S	%	S	%	S	%	S	%	S	%	S
Formentera													54.5	1
Ibiza	47.1	6							45.8	6				
Mallorca	46.7	16	30.1	10	11.2	4	8.4	3						
Menorca	43.0	6	38.4	6							9.0	1		
Total	46.0	28	27.6	16	9.0	4	6.7	3	4.6	6	0.8	1	0.4	1

== Aftermath ==
=== Government formation ===
Investiture; Nomination of Francesc Antich (PSIB)
Ballot →	4 July 2007
Required majority →	30 out of 59
Yes: • PSIB (20); • Bloc–PSM–EV (5); • UM (3); • EU (2)	30 / 59
No: • PP (28); • AIPF (1)	29 / 59
Abstentions	0 / 59
Absentees	0 / 59

== Bibliography ==
- Ley Orgánica 5/1985, de 19 de junio, del Régimen Electoral General (Organic Law 5/1985). Official State Gazette (in Spanish). 19 June 1985 [version as of 20 April 2007]. BOE-A-1985-11672.
- Ley 8/1986, de 26 de noviembre, Electoral de la Comunidad Autónoma de las Islas Baleares (Law 8/1986). Official State Gazette (in Spanish). 26 November 1986 [version as of 3 November 2006]. BOE-A-1987-2903.
- Ley 4/2001, de 14 de marzo, del Gobierno de las Illes Balears (Law 4/2001). Official State Gazette (in Spanish). 14 March 2001 [version as of 3 April 2003]. BOE-A-2001-7026.
- Ley Orgánica 1/2007, de 28 de febrero, de reforma del Estatuto de Autonomía de las Illes Balears (Organic Law 1/2007). Official State Gazette (in Spanish). 28 February 2007 [version as of 1 March 2007]. BOE-A-2007-4233.
- Decreto 5/2007, de 2 de abril, del Presidente de las Illes Balears, de disolución del Parlamento de las Illes Balears y de convocatoria de elecciones (PDF) (Decree 5/2007). Official Gazette of the Balearic Islands (in Spanish). 2 April 2007.
