= List of members of the Congress of Deputies (Spain) =

This is a list of members of the Congress of Deputies (Spain).

- List of members of the 1st Congress of Deputies (Spain)
- List of members of the 2nd Congress of Deputies (Spain)
- List of members of the 3rd Congress of Deputies (Spain)
- List of members of the 4th Congress of Deputies (Spain)
- List of members of the 5th Congress of Deputies (Spain)
- List of members of the 6th Congress of Deputies (Spain)
- List of members of the 7th Congress of Deputies (Spain)
- List of members of the 8th Congress of Deputies (Spain)
- List of members of the 9th Congress of Deputies (Spain)
- List of members of the 10th Congress of Deputies (Spain)
- List of members of the 11th Congress of Deputies (Spain)
- List of members of the 12th Congress of Deputies (Spain)
- List of members of the 13th Congress of Deputies (Spain)
- List of members of the 14th Congress of Deputies (Spain)
- List of members of the 15th Congress of Deputies (Spain)
- List of members of the 16th Congress of Deputies (Spain)
