= Bloc for Mallorca =

Bloc for Mallorca Bloc per Mallorca
- Leader: Gabriel Barceló
- Founded: 17 November 2006
- Dissolved: 14 April 2011
- Merger of: PSM–EN; EU–EV; ERC
- Ideology: Socialism; Environmentalism; Catalan nationalism
- Political position: Left-wing

The Bloc for Mallorca (Catalan: Bloc per Mallorca, Bloc) was an electoral alliance in Mallorca formed by the PSM–Nationalist Agreement, United Left–The Greens Alternative (Catalan: Alternativa Esquerra Unida–Els Verds) and Republican Left of Catalonia to contest the 2007 Balearic regional election.

== Composition ==
Party
PSM–Nationalist Agreement (PSM–EN)
United Left–The Greens Alternative (EU–EV)
Republican Left of Catalonia (ERC)
