= Formentera (Senate constituency) =

Coordinates: 38°42′N 1°27′W

- Senate of Spain; Electoral constituency
- Island: Formentera
- Autonomous community: Balearic Islands

Current constituency
- Created: 2026
- Seats: 1

Formentera is one of the 60 constituencies represented in the Senate of Spain, the upper chamber of the Spanish parliament, the Cortes Generales. The constituency (whose boundaries correspond to those of the island of Formentera) elects one senator. The electoral system uses open-list (Note: Parties can group candidates into lists, although each candidate is treated separately for the purpose of the voting procedure.) partial block voting, with electors voting for individual candidates instead of parties. It was established ahead of the 2026 election by separating Formentera from Ibiza, abolishing the Ibiza–Formentera (Senate constituency) constituency.

== Electoral system ==
Voting is based on universal suffrage, comprising all Spanish nationals over 18 years of age with full political rights, provided that they have not been deprived of the right to vote by a final sentence. The only exception was in 1977, when this was limited to nationals over 21 years of age and in full enjoyment of their political and civil rights. Amendments in 2011 required non-resident citizens to apply for voting, a system known as "begged" voting (Spanish: Voto rogado). which was abolished in 2022. Further, amendments in 2018 granted the right to vote to those legally incapacitated. 209 Senate seats (207 in 1977, 208 from 1978 to 2026) are elected using open-list partial block voting: voters in constituencies electing four seats can choose up to three candidates; in those with two or three seats, up to two; and in single-member districts, one. Each of the 47 peninsular provinces is allocated four seats, while in insular provinces—such as the Balearic and Canary Islands—the districts are the islands themselves, with the larger ones (Mallorca, Gran Canaria and Tenerife) being allocated three seats each, and the smaller ones (Menorca, Ibiza, Formentera, Fuerteventura, La Gomera, El Hierro, Lanzarote and La Palma) one each. (Note: La Gomera and El Hierro comprised a single constituency for the 1977 election. A constitutional reform in 2026 awarded Formentera an independent senator separate from Ibiza.) Ceuta and Melilla elect two seats each. Until 1985, the law also provided for by-elections to fill Senate seats vacated up to two years into the legislature; subsequently, any vacancies arising after the proclamation of candidates and during the legislative term are filled by the next candidates on the party lists or, when required, by designated substitutes.

The electoral law allows for parties and federations registered in the interior ministry, alliances and groupings of electors to present lists of candidates. Parties and federations intending to form an alliance are required to inform the relevant electoral commission within 10 days of the election call—15 before 1985—whereas groupings of electors need to secure the signature of at least one percent of the electorate in the constituencies for which they seek election—one permille of the electorate, with a compulsory minimum of 500 signatures, until 1985—disallowing electors from signing for more than one list. Also since 2011, parties, federations or alliances that have not obtained a mandate in either chamber of the Cortes at the preceding election are required to secure the signature of at least 0.1 percent of electors in the aforementioned constituencies. Amendments in 2007 required a balanced composition of men and women in the electoral lists, so that candidates of either sex made up at least 40 percent of the total composition; further amendments in 2024 required the use of a zipper system.

== Bibliography ==
- Ley 1/1977, de 4 de enero, para la Reforma Política (Fundamental Law 1/1977). Official State Gazette (in Spanish). 4 January 1977. BOE-A-1977-165.
- Real Decreto-ley 20/1977, de 18 de marzo, sobre Normas Electorales (Royal Decree-Law 20/1977). Official State Gazette (in Spanish). 18 March 1977. BOE-A-1977-7445.
- Constitución Española (Constitution). Official State Gazette (in Spanish). 27 December 1978. BOE-A-1978-31229.
- Ley Orgánica 5/1985, de 19 de junio, del Régimen Electoral General (Organic Law 5/1985). Official State Gazette (in Spanish). 19 June 1985. BOE-A-1985-11672.
- Carreras de Odriozola, Albert; Tafunell Sambola, Xavier (2005) [1989]. Estadísticas históricas de España, siglos XIX-XX (PDF) (in Spanish). Vol. 1 (II ed.). Bilbao: Fundación BBVA. pp. 1072–1097. ISBN 84-96515-00-1. Archived from the original (PDF) on 24 September 2015.
