= United Residents =

United Residents (in Spanish: Residentes Unidos) is a political party on the island of Ibiza, Spain. The group was formed to safeguard interests of foreign residents. One of the issues the party is raising is multilingualism.

The president of the party is José María Echániz.

The party was registered on May 29, 2002. A year later it claimed to have 300 members. In the 2003 municipal elections Residentes Unidos got 119 votes in the municipality of Ibiza Town (0.77%, no seat) and 160 votes in Sant Antoni de Portmany (2.09%, no seat).
