= 16th Congress of Deputies =

Congress of Deputies from 2026 Spanish general election

←	15th
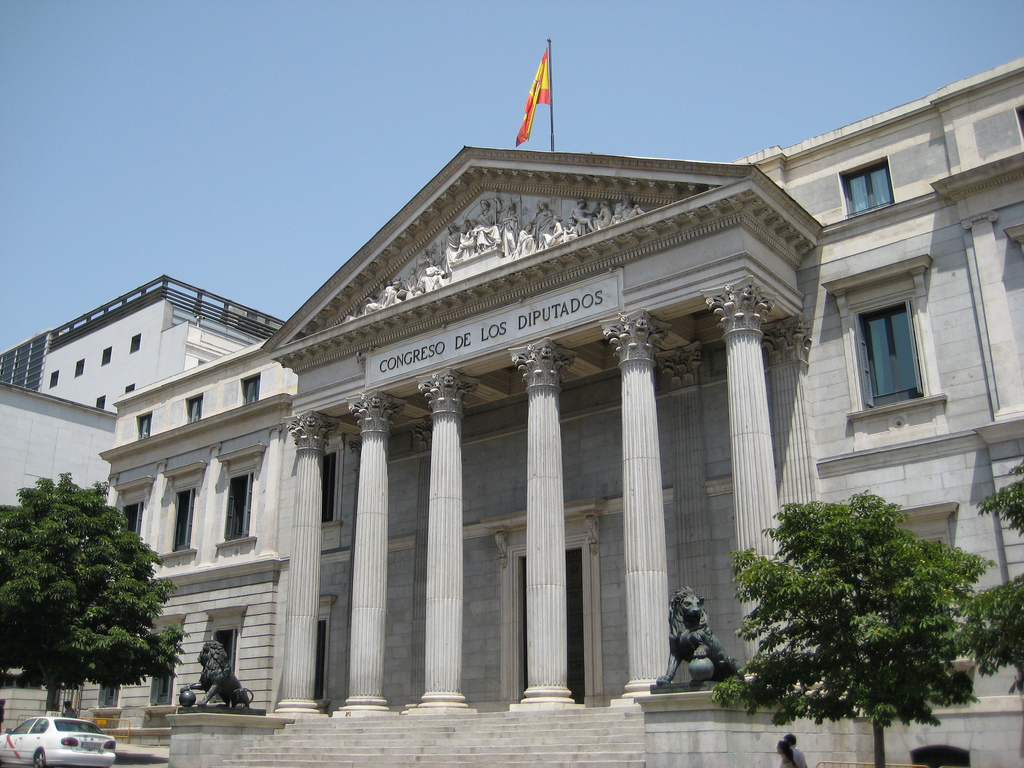

Overview
- Legislative body: Congress of Deputies
- Meeting place: Palacio de las Cortes
- Term: December 2026 –
- Election: 29 November 2026
- Government: Third government of Pedro Sánchez
- Website: congreso.es

Deputies
- Members: 350
- President: TBD
- First Vice-President: TBD
- Second Vice-President: TBD
- Third Vice-President: TBD
- Fourth Vice-President: TBD
- First Secretary: TBD
- Second Secretary: TBD
- Third Secretary: TBD
- Fourth Secretary: TBD

The 16th Congress of Deputies will be a meeting of the Congress of Deputies, the lower house of the Spanish Cortes Generales, with the membership determined by the results of the general election held on 29 November 2026. The congress will meet for the first time in December 2026. According to the Constitution of Spain the maximum legislative term of the congress is 4 years from the preceding election. 350 members of the Congress of Deputies were elected in the 2026 Spanish general election to sit in the 16th Cortes Generales.

== Background ==
=== Election process ===
The members of the Congress (currently 350) are directly elected by the people. The Congress of Deputies has a minimum of 300 and a maximum of 400 seats, with electoral provisions fixing its size at 350. Of these, 348 are elected in 50 multi-member constituencies corresponding to the provinces of Spain—each of which is assigned an initial minimum of two seats and the remaining 248 distributed in proportion to population—using the D'Hondt method and closed-list proportional voting, with a three percent-threshold of valid votes (including blank ballots) in each constituency. The remaining two seats are allocated to Ceuta and Melilla as single-member districts elected by plurality voting. The use of this electoral method may result in a higher effective threshold depending on district magnitude and vote distribution.

This allocation is heavily weighted in favour of small provinces; as one MP from the most populated province Madrid, with its 7.2 million people, represents 190,000 citizens, and one MP from Soria, with 90,000 inhabitants, represents 45,000 citizens.

== Election ==
The 16th Spanish general election under the 1978 Constitution will be held on 29 November 2026.

Alliance	Votes	%	Seats	+/−
PP	0,0	0.00	0	±0
PSOE	0,0	0.00	0	±0
Vox	0,0	0.00	0	±0
Broad Front (FA)	0,0	0.00	0	±0
ERC–Sob–ERPV	0,0	0.00	0	±0
EH Bildu	0,0	0.00	0	±0
JxCat–Junts	0,0	0.00	0	±0
EAJ/PNV	0,0	0.00	0	±0
Others/blanks	0,0	0.00	0	±0
Total	0,0	0.00	0	±0

== History ==
The new Congress will meet for the first time on December 2026 and elected a new President of the Congress of Deputies.

Other members of the Bureau of the Congress were also elected First Vice-President; Second Vice-President; Third Vice-President; Fourth Vice-President; First Secretary; Second Secretary; Third Secretary; and Fourth Secretary.

President
Candidate		Votes
TBD	—	0
TBD	—	0
Blank ballots		0
Invalid ballots		0
Absentees		0
Vacant		0
Total		267

Vice-President
Candidate		Votes
TBD	—	0
TBD	—	0
TBD	—	0
TBD	—	0
TBD	—	0
TBD	—	0
Blank ballots		0
Invalid ballots		0
Absentees		0
Vacant		0
Total		267

Secretary
Candidate		Votes
TBD	—	0
TBD	—	0
TBD	—	0
TBD	—	0
TBD	—	0
TBD	—	0
Blank ballots		0
Invalid ballots		0
Absentees		0
Vacant		0
Total		0

== Deaths, disqualifications, resignations and suspensions ==
The 16th Congress has seen the following deaths, disqualifications, resignations and suspensions:

== Members by constituency ==
Name	Constituency	No.	Votes	Party	Alliance	Group	Took office	Left office	Notes

== See also ==
- 16th Cortes Generales
- 16th Senate of Spain

== Sources ==
- "The Spanish Constitution" (PDF). Agencia Estatal Boletín Oficial del Estado. 1978.
- Ley Orgánica 5/1985, de 19 de junio, del Régimen Electoral General (Organic Law 5/1985). Official State Gazette (in Spanish). 19 June 1985. BOE-A-1985-11672.
- "Otras Disposiciones: Junta Electoral Central – Elecciones generales. Proclamación de candidaturas" (PDF). Boletín Oficial del Estado (in Spanish). No. 79. Madrid, Spain: Government of Spain. 2 April 2019. pp. 34184–34462. ISSN 0212-033X.
- "Otras Disposiciones: Junta Electoral Central – Elecciones generales. Resultados" (PDF). Boletín Oficial del Estado (in Spanish). No. 129. Madrid, Spain: Government of Spain. 30 May 2019. pp. 57384–57391. ISSN 0212-033X.
