= Nationalist Left of the Balearic Islands Federation =

Nationalist Left of the Balearic Islands Federation Federació de l'Esquerra Nacionalista de les Illes Balears
- Founded: 1989
- Dissolved: 1998
- Succeeded by: PSM–Nationalist Agreement
- Ideology: Democratic socialism Environmentalism; Catalan nationalism Catalanism; Catalan independentism

The Nationalist Left of the Balearic Islands Federation (Catalan: Federació de l'Esquerra Nacionalista de les Illes Balears, Spanish: Federación de la Izquierda Nacionalista de las Islas Baleares, FENIB), also known as Nationalist Left Federation, was formed in 1989 by the Socialist Party of Mallorca, Socialist Party of Menorca and Entesa Nacionalista i Ecologista (English: Nationalist and Ecologist Agreement). In 1998 it was transformed into the PSM–Nationalist Agreement party federation.
