= Ibiza–Formentera (Senate constituency) =

Coordinates: 38°59′N 1°26′W

- Senate of Spain; Electoral constituency
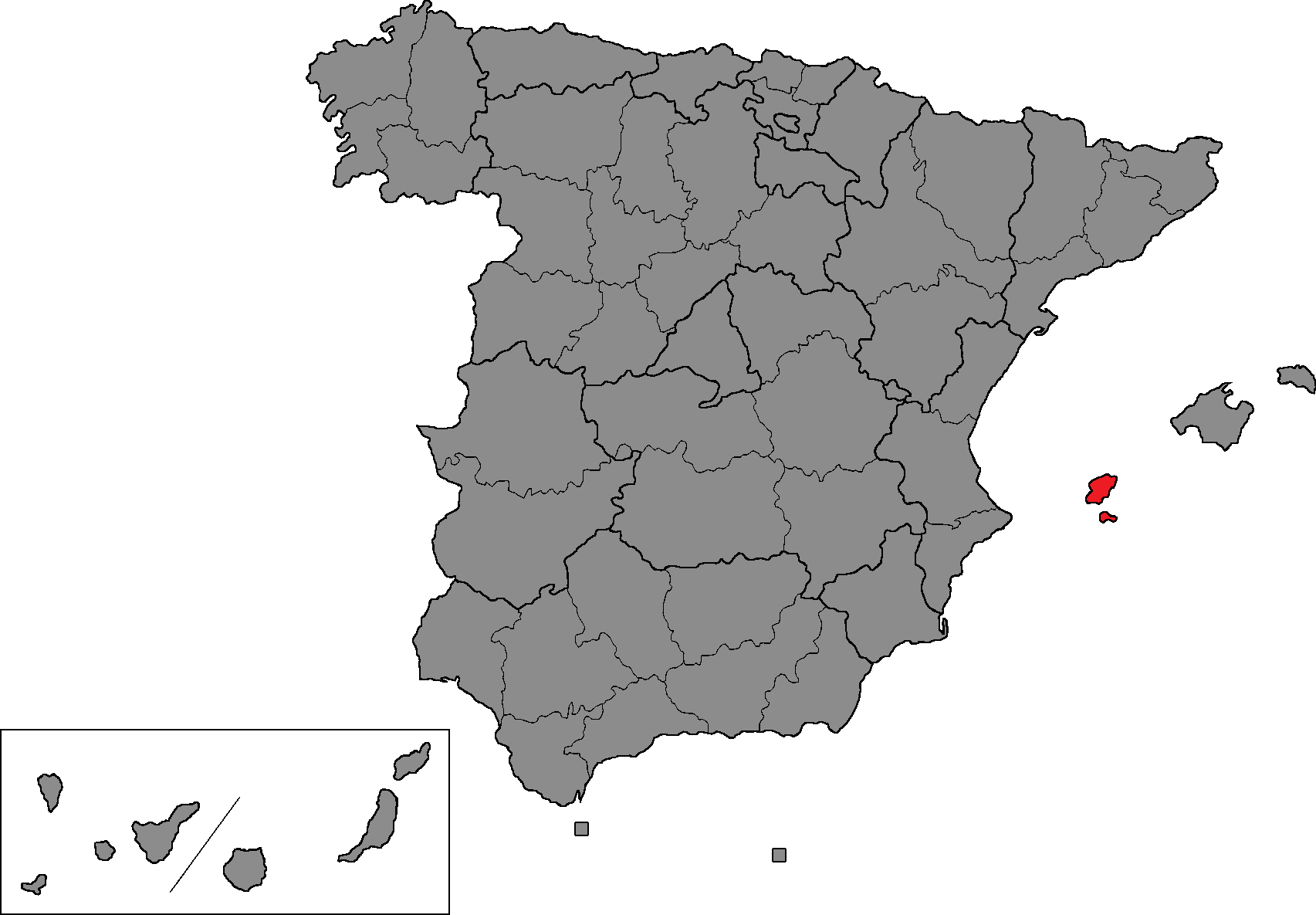
- Location of Ibiza–Formentera within Spain
- Island: Formentera and Ibiza
- Autonomous community: Balearic Islands
- Population: ▲172,033 (2024)
- Electorate: ▲105,924 (2023)
- Major settlements: Ibiza, Santa Eulària des Riu

Current constituency
- Created: 1977
- Seats: 1
- Member: PSOE (1)

Ibiza–Formentera (Catalan: Eivissa–Formentera) was one of the 59 constituencies represented in the Senate of Spain, the upper chamber of the Spanish parliament, the Cortes Generales. The constituency (whose boundaries corresponded to those of the islands of Ibiza and Formentera) elected one senator. The electoral system used open-list (Note: Parties could group candidates into lists, although each candidate was treated separately for the purpose of the voting procedure.) partial block voting, with electors voting for individual candidates instead of parties. It was established for the 1977 general election and was abolished for the 2026 election, when Ibiza and Formentera formed separate constituencies, each electing one senator.

== Electoral system ==
The constituency was created as per the Political Reform Law and was first contested in the 1977 general election. The Law provided for the provinces of Spain to be established as multi-member districts in the Senate, with this regulation being maintained under the Spanish Constitution of 1978. Additionally, the Constitution requires for any modification of the provincial limits to be approved under an organic law, needing an absolute majority in the Cortes Generales.

Voting was based on universal suffrage, comprising all Spanish nationals over 18 years of age with full political rights, provided that they had not been deprived of the right to vote by a final sentence. The only exception was in 1977, when this was limited to nationals over 21 years of age and in full enjoyment of their political and civil rights. Amendments in 2011 required non-resident citizens to apply for voting, a system known as "begged" voting (Spanish: Voto rogado). which was abolished in 2022. Further, amendments in 2018 granted the right to vote to those legally incapacitated. 209 Senate seats (207 in 1977, 208 from 1978 to 2026) were elected using open-list partial block voting: voters in constituencies electing four seats could choose up to three candidates; in those with two or three seats, up to two; and in single-member districts, one. Each of the 47 peninsular provinces was allocated four seats, while in insular provinces—such as the Balearic and Canary Islands—the districts were the islands themselves, with the larger ones (Mallorca, Gran Canaria and Tenerife) being allocated three seats each, and the smaller ones (Menorca, Ibiza, Formentera, Fuerteventura, La Gomera, El Hierro, Lanzarote and La Palma) one each. (Note: La Gomera and El Hierro comprised a single constituency for the 1977 election. A constitutional reform in 2026 awarded Formentera an independent senator separate from Ibiza.) Ceuta and Melilla elected two seats each. Until 1985, the law also provided for by-elections to fill Senate seats vacated up to two years into the legislature; subsequently, any vacancies arising after the proclamation of candidates and during the legislative term were filled by the next candidates on the party lists or, when required, by designated substitutes.

The electoral law allowed for parties and federations registered in the interior ministry, alliances and groupings of electors to present lists of candidates. Parties and federations intending to form an alliance were required to inform the relevant electoral commission within 10 days of the election call—15 before 1985—whereas groupings of electors needed to secure the signature of at least one percent of the electorate in the constituencies for which they sought election—one permille of the electorate, with a compulsory minimum of 500 signatures, until 1985—disallowing electors from signing for more than one list. Also since 2011, parties, federations or alliances that had not obtained a mandate in either chamber of the Cortes at the preceding election were required to secure the signature of at least 0.1 percent of electors in the aforementioned constituencies. Amendments in 2007 required a balanced composition of men and women in the electoral lists, so that candidates of either sex made up at least 40 percent of the total composition; further amendments in 2024 required the use of a zipper system.

== Senators ==
Senators for Ibiza–Formentera 1977–
Key to parties EFS PSOE+ExC PSOE PP CP CD AP
Legislature	Election	Distribution
Constituent	1977	1
1st	1979	1
2nd	1982	1
3rd	1986	1
4th	1989	1
5th	1993	1
6th	1996	1
7th	2000	1
8th	2004	1
9th	2008	1
10th	2011	1
11th	2015	1
12th	2016	1
13th	2019 (Apr)	1
14th	2019 (Nov)	1
15th	2023	1

== General elections ==
=== 2023 ===
Summary of the 23 July 2023 Senate of Spain election results in Ibiza–Formentera
Parties and alliances	Popular vote			Seats	
Parties and alliances	Votes	%	±pp	Total	+/−
Ibiza and Formentera in the Senate (PSOE–SMR–EU–Ara Eivissa)^{1}	26,389	45.41	−3.64	1	±0
People's Party (PP)	23,472	40.39	+13.34	0	±0
Vox (Vox)	6,607	11.37	−1.36	0	±0
Zero Cuts (Recortes Cero)	577	0.99	+0.46	0	±0
Blank ballots (Note: The percentage of blank ballots is calculated over the official number of valid votes cast, irrespective of the total number of votes shown as a result of adding up the individual results for each party.)	1,070	1.84	+0.12		
Total	58,115			1	±0
Valid votes	58,115	96.80	−0.86		
Invalid votes	1,922	3.20	+0.86		
Votes cast / turnout	60,037	56.68	+3.67		
Abstentions	45,887	43.32	−3.67		
Registered voters	105,924				
Sources
Footnotes: ^{1} Ibiza and Formentera in the Senate results are compared to the combined totals of Spanish Socialist Workers' Party, United We Can and Republican Left of Catalonia in the November 2019 election.

=== November 2019 ===
Summary of the 10 November 2019 Senate of Spain election results in Ibiza–Formentera
Parties and alliances	Popular vote			Seats	
Parties and alliances	Votes	%	±pp	Total	+/−
Spanish Socialist Workers' Party (PSOE)	15,574	29.07		1	±0
People's Party (PP)	14,492	27.05		0	±0
United We Can (Podemos–EUIB)	9,094	16.97		0	±0
Vox (Vox)	6,822	12.73		0	±0
Citizens–Party of the Citizenry (Cs)	3,618	6.75		0	±0
Republican Left (esquerra)	1,612	3.01	New	0	±0
Animalist Party Against Mistreatment of Animals (PACMA)	1,166	2.18		0	±0
Zero Cuts–Green Group (Recortes Cero–GV)	283	0.53		0	±0
Blank ballots	919	1.72			
Total	53,581			1	±0
Valid votes	53,581	97.66			
Invalid votes	1,284	2.34			
Votes cast / turnout	54,865	53.01			
Abstentions	48,638	46.99			
Registered voters	103,503				

=== 1986 ===
Summary of the 22 June 1986 Senate of Spain election results in Ibiza–Formentera
Candidates	Parties and coalitions	Popular vote	
Candidates	Parties and coalitions	Votes	%
Alonso Marí Calbet	AP–PDP–PL	13,203	44.77
• Jaime Ribas Prats	PSOE	11,194	37.96
• Andrés Tuells Juan	CDS	2,092	7.09
• Juan Pantaleoni Rosello	PRD	929	3.15
• Antonio Planells Tur	IU	706	2.39
• Elsa Gluck Rogg	VERDE	273	0.93
• Fidel Arcos García	MUC	121	0.41
• José Francisco Crespo Albiach	UCE	100	0.34
Blank ballots		872	2.96
Total		29,490	
Valid votes		29,490	95.95
Invalid votes		1,244	4.05
Votes cast / turnout		30,734	57.94
Abstentions		22,308	42.06
Registered voters		53,042	

=== 1982 ===
Summary of the 28 October 1982 Senate of Spain election results in Ibiza–Formentera
Candidates	Parties and coalitions	Popular vote	
Candidates	Parties and coalitions	Votes	%
Enrique Ramón Fajarnés	AP–PDP	14,849	
• María de los Llanos Lozano Guevara	PSOE	9,916	
• Víctor Ferraz Yagüe	UCD	2,316	
• Andrés Tuells Juan	CDS	1,089	
• Antonio Planells Tur	PCE	794	
• José María Puget Acebo	AEPI	0	
• Ramón Francisco Martín Gordón	FE–JONS	0	
Blank ballots			
Total			
Valid votes			
Invalid votes			
Votes cast / turnout			
Abstentions			
Registered voters		43,130	

=== 1979 ===
Summary of the 1 March 1979 Senate of Spain election results in Ibiza–Formentera
Candidates	Parties and coalitions	Popular vote	
Candidates	Parties and coalitions	Votes	%
Abel Matutes Juan	CD	10,265	42.40
• Isidor Marí Mayans	CPI	7,763	32.07
• Juan Marí Tur	UCD	5,612	23.18
• Guillermo Tuells Riquer	PL	220	0.91
• Antonio Ferrer Juan	UN	115	0.48
Blank ballots		235	0.97
Total		24,210	
Valid votes		24,210	98.20
Invalid votes		443	1.80
Votes cast / turnout		24,653	63.53
Abstentions		14,152	36.47
Registered voters		38,805	

=== 1977 ===
Summary of the 15 June 1977 Senate of Spain election results in Ibiza–Formentera
Parties and alliances	Popular vote			Seats	
Parties and alliances	Votes	%	±pp	Total	+/−
People's Alliance (AP)	8,862	38.30	n/a	1	n/a
Autonomist Bloc (PSP–PCE–PSD)	6,540	28.27	n/a	0	n/a
Union of the Democratic Centre (UCD)	5,585	24.14	n/a	0	n/a
Autonomous Movement (MAP)	1,880	8.13	n/a	0	n/a
Democratic Union of the Balearic Islands (UDIB)	269	1.16	n/a	0	n/a
Blank ballots			n/a		
Total	23,136			1	n/a
Valid votes			n/a		
Invalid votes			n/a		
Votes cast / turnout			n/a		
Abstentions			n/a		
Registered voters	35,170				

== Bibliography ==
- Ley 1/1977, de 4 de enero, para la Reforma Política (Fundamental Law 1/1977). Official State Gazette (in Spanish). 4 January 1977. BOE-A-1977-165.
- Real Decreto-ley 20/1977, de 18 de marzo, sobre Normas Electorales (Royal Decree-Law 20/1977). Official State Gazette (in Spanish). 18 March 1977. BOE-A-1977-7445.
- Constitución Española (Constitution). Official State Gazette (in Spanish). 27 December 1978. BOE-A-1978-31229.
- Ley Orgánica 5/1985, de 19 de junio, del Régimen Electoral General (Organic Law 5/1985). Official State Gazette (in Spanish). 19 June 1985. BOE-A-1985-11672.
- Carreras de Odriozola, Albert; Tafunell Sambola, Xavier (2005) [1989]. Estadísticas históricas de España, siglos XIX-XX (PDF) (in Spanish). Vol. 1 (II ed.). Bilbao: Fundación BBVA. pp. 1072–1097. ISBN 84-96515-00-1. Archived from the original (PDF) on 24 September 2015.
