= Pacte Progressista =

- Ballot symbol used in 2023 Senate election
- Founded: 1996; 2023
- Dissolved: 2006
- Succeeded by: Eivissa pel Canvi
- Political position: Centre-left to left-wing
- Colours
- Senate of Spain (Ibiza-Formentera seat): 1 / 1

The Pacte Progressista (English: Progressive Pact, Pacte), officially the Pacte Progressista d'Eivissa (English: Progressive Pact of Ibiza), is an electoral alliance formed in Ibiza by the Socialist Party of the Balearic Islands, United Left of Ibiza, The Greens of Ibiza, Entesa Nacionalista i Ecologista (English: Nationalist and Ecologist Agreement of Ibiza) and Republican Left of Catalonia to contest the 1999 and 2003 regional elections. Previously, it had contested the 1996 Senate election in the Ibiza–Formentera constituency as Eivissa i Formentera al Senat (English: Ibiza and Formentera in the Senate), and it would also contest the 2000 Senate election as the Pacte per Eivissa i Formentera (English: Pact for Ibiza and Formentera).

The alliance would be reestablished as "Eivissa i Formentera al Senat" ahead of the 2023 Spanish general election with PSOE, Sumar, EU and Ara Eivissa as its components.

== Background ==
Ahead of the 1996 general election, Ibiza and Formentera only elected one senator to the Spanish Cortes. The disunity of the nationalist and left-of-centre forces always meant that the senator was won by right-of-centre parties. As a result, the Pact was meant as a unitary candidacy of all left parties, obtaining a great electoral success by winning the senator from the People's Party.

== Composition ==
First incarnation (1996)

Party
Socialist Party of the Balearic Islands (PSIB–PSOE)
United Left of Ibiza (EU)
Nationalist and Ecologist Agreement (ENE)
Republican Left of Catalonia (ERC)
The Greens of Ibiza (EV–Eiv) (1996–2003)

Second incarnation (2023)

Party
Socialist Party of the Balearic Islands (PSIB–PSOE)
Unite Movement (SMR)
United Left of Ibiza (EU)
Now Ibiza (Ara Eivissa)
We Can (Podem) (since 2026)

== Electoral performance ==
=== Senate ===
Election	Leading candidate	Senate			
Election	Leading candidate	Votes	%	Seats	+/–
1996	Pilar Costa	21,365	53.43 (#1)	1 / 1	1
2000	Fanny Tur	16,050	38.76 (#2)	0 / 1	1
2023	Juanjo Ferrer	25,935	45.35 (#1)	1 / 1	1
