= Balearic People's Union =

Balearic People's Union Unió d’es Pobble Baléà
- Leader: Vicente Garau
- Founded: 1998
- Ideology: Gonellisme; Spanish nationalism Balearic regionalism
- Political position: Right-wing

Balearic People's Union (in Spanish: Unión del Pueblo Balear, Balearic dialect: Unió d’es Pobble Baléà) is a political party on the island of Menorca, Spain. UPB was formed around 1998, and revived ahead of the 2003 municipal elections. Vicente Garau is the president of the party. UPB opposes Catalan independentism and pancatalanism.

Ahead of the 2003 municipal elections 8 of the candidates of the party withdrew, claiming that they had never given consent to stand on the lists of the party. They charged that Garau had tricked them into producing their signatures.
