= Entesa d'Eivissa =

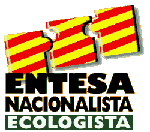
- Founded: 8 September 1989
- Dissolved: 2016
- Ideology: Democratic socialism Ecologism; Catalan nationalism
- Regional affiliation: Nationalist Left of the Balearic Islands Federation (1989–1998); PSM–Nationalist Agreement (1998–2016)

Website
- entesaeivissa.blogspot.com

Entesa d'Eivissa (English: Agreement of Ibiza, Entesa), founded in 1989 as Entesa Nacionalista i Ecologista d'Eivissa (English: Nationalist and Ecologist Agreement of Ibiza, ENEE), and officially known from 1990 to 2012 as Entesa Nacionalista i Ecologista (English: Nationalist and Ecologist Agreement, ENE), was an Ibiza-based political party in Spain. It joined the Nationalist Left of the Balearic Islands Federation upon foundation in 1989, later joining its successor alliance, the PSM–Nationalist Agreement, in 1998.

In the 2015 regional election, Entesa supported the United Left-led candidacy Let's Win the Balearic Islands. After the resignation of its General Secretary Maurici Cuesta in 2016, the party was deactivated.
