= Mallorca (Senate constituency) =

Representation of the island of Mallorca in the Senate of Spain

Coordinates: 39°37′N 2°59′W

- Senate of Spain; Electoral constituency
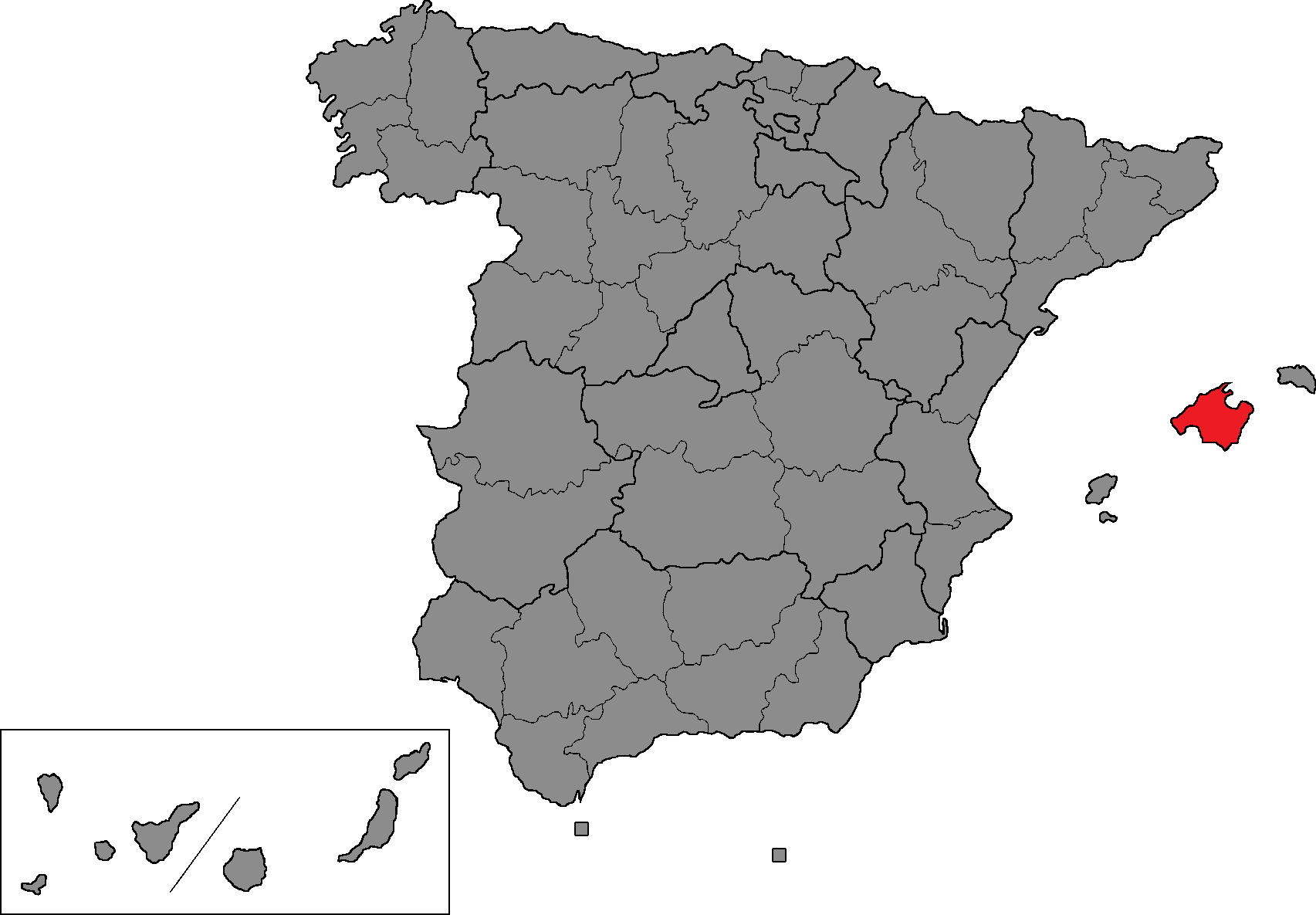
- Location of Mallorca within Spain
- Island: Mallorca
- Autonomous community: Balearic Islands
- Population: ▲949,047 (2024)
- Electorate: ▲648,249 (2023)
- Major settlements: Palma, Calvià

Current constituency
- Created: 1977
- Seats: 3
- Members: PP (2); PSOE (1)

Mallorca is one of the 60 constituencies represented in the Senate of Spain, the upper chamber of the Spanish parliament, the Cortes Generales. The constituency (whose boundaries correspond to those of the homonymous island) elects three senators. The electoral system uses open-list (Note: Parties can group candidates into lists, although each candidate is treated separately for the purpose of the voting procedure.) partial block voting, with electors voting for individual candidates instead of parties. Electors can vote for up to two candidates.

== Electoral system ==
The constituency was created as per the Political Reform Law and was first contested in the 1977 general election. The Law provided for the provinces of Spain to be established as multi-member districts in the Senate, with this regulation being maintained under the Spanish Constitution of 1978. Additionally, the Constitution requires for any modification of the provincial limits to be approved under an organic law, needing an absolute majority in the Cortes Generales.

Voting is based on universal suffrage, comprising all Spanish nationals over 18 years of age with full political rights, provided that they have not been deprived of the right to vote by a final sentence. The only exception was in 1977, when this was limited to nationals over 21 years of age and in full enjoyment of their political and civil rights. Amendments in 2011 required non-resident citizens to apply for voting, a system known as "begged" voting (Spanish: Voto rogado). which was abolished in 2022. Further, amendments in 2018 granted the right to vote to those legally incapacitated. 209 Senate seats (207 in 1977, 208 from 1978 to 2026) are elected using open-list partial block voting: voters in constituencies electing four seats can choose up to three candidates; in those with two or three seats, up to two; and in single-member districts, one. Each of the 47 peninsular provinces is allocated four seats, while in insular provinces—such as the Balearic and Canary Islands—the districts are the islands themselves, with the larger ones (Mallorca, Gran Canaria and Tenerife) being allocated three seats each, and the smaller ones (Menorca, Ibiza, Formentera, Fuerteventura, La Gomera, El Hierro, Lanzarote and La Palma) one each. (Note: La Gomera and El Hierro comprised a single constituency for the 1977 election. A constitutional reform in 2026 awarded Formentera an independent senator separate from Ibiza.) Ceuta and Melilla elect two seats each. Until 1985, the law also provided for by-elections to fill Senate seats vacated up to two years into the legislature; subsequently, any vacancies arising after the proclamation of candidates and during the legislative term are filled by the next candidates on the party lists or, when required, by designated substitutes.

The electoral law allows for parties and federations registered in the interior ministry, alliances and groupings of electors to present lists of candidates. Parties and federations intending to form an alliance are required to inform the relevant electoral commission within 10 days of the election call—15 before 1985—whereas groupings of electors need to secure the signature of at least one percent of the electorate in the constituencies for which they seek election—one permille of the electorate, with a compulsory minimum of 500 signatures, until 1985—disallowing electors from signing for more than one list. Also since 2011, parties, federations or alliances that have not obtained a mandate in either chamber of the Cortes at the preceding election are required to secure the signature of at least 0.1 percent of electors in the aforementioned constituencies. Amendments in 2007 required a balanced composition of men and women in the electoral lists, so that candidates of either sex made up at least 40 percent of the total composition; further amendments in 2024 required the use of a zipper system.

== Senators ==
Senators for Mallorca 1977–
Key to parties UPM Podemos PSOE UCD PP CP AP
Legislature	Election	Distribution
Constituent	1977	1 / 2
1st	1979	1 / 2
2nd	1982	2 / 1
3rd	1986	2 / 1
4th	1989	1 / 2
5th	1993	1 / 2
6th	1996	1 / 2
7th	2000	1 / 2
8th	2004	1 / 2
9th	2008	1 / 2
10th	2011	1 / 2
11th	2015	1 / 2
12th	2016	1 / 2
13th	2019 (Apr)	2 / 1
14th	2019 (Nov)	2 / 1
15th	2023	1 / 2

== General elections ==
=== 2023 ===
Summary of the 23 July 2023 Senate of Spain election results in Mallorca
Parties and alliances	Popular vote			Seats	
Parties and alliances	Votes	%	±pp	Total	+/−
People's Party (PP)	279,209	37.03	+9.58	2	+1
Socialist Party of the Balearic Islands (PSIB–PSOE)	233,965	31.03	+2.99	1	−1
More for Mallorca–Unite (Més–Sumar)^{1}	115,861	15.37	−8.45	0	±0
Vox (Vox)	106,978	14.19	+4.96	0	±0
Animalist Party with the Environment (PACMA)^{2}	9,136	1.21	−0.68	0	±0
Zero Cuts (Recortes Cero)	1,314	0.17	−0.02	0	±0
Communist Party of the Workers of Spain (PCTE)	1,152	0.15	New	0	±0
Blank ballots (Note: The percentage of blank ballots is calculated over the official number of valid votes cast, irrespective of the total number of votes shown as a result of adding up the individual results for each party.)	6,339	1.61	−0.19		
Total	753,954			3	±0
Valid votes	394,716	97.71	+0.07		
Invalid votes	9,263	2.29	−0.07		
Votes cast / turnout	403,979	62.32	+4.87		
Abstentions	244,270	37.68	−4.87		
Registered voters	648,249				
Sources
Footnotes: ^{1} More for Mallorca–Unite results are compared to the combined totals of United We Can, More Left and More Country in the November 2019 election.; ^{2} Animalist Party with the Environment results are compared to Animalist Party Against Mistreatment of Animals totals in the November 2019 election.

=== November 2019 ===
Summary of the 10 November 2019 Senate of Spain election results in Mallorca
Parties and alliances	Popular vote			Seats	
Parties and alliances	Votes	%	±pp	Total	+/−
Spanish Socialist Workers' Party (PSOE)	178,718	28.04		2	±0
People's Party (PP)	175,007	27.45		1	±0
United We Can (Podemos–EUIB)	105,145	16.49		0	±0
Vox (Vox)	58,822	9.23		0	±0
Citizens–Party of the Citizenry (Cs)	51,858	8.14		0	±0
More Left (Més–esquerra)	37,727	5.92	New	0	±0
Animalist Party Against Mistreatment of Animals (PACMA)	12,062	1.89		0	±0
More Country (Más País)	8,978	1.41	New	0	±0
Zero Cuts–Green Group (Recortes Cero–GV)	1,225	0.19		0	±0
For a Fairer World (PUM+J)	1,025	0.16		0	±0
Libertarian Party (P–LIB)	481	0.08	New	0	±0
Blank ballots	6,398	1.80			
Total	637,446			3	±0
Valid votes	354,766	97.64			
Invalid votes	8,588	2.36			
Votes cast / turnout	363,354	57.45			
Abstentions	269,143	42.55			
Registered voters	632,497				

=== April 2019 ===
Summary of the 28 April 2019 Senate of Spain election results in Mallorca
Candidates	Parties and coalitions	Popular vote	
Candidates	Parties and coalitions	Votes	%
Cosme Bonet Bonet	PSOE	107,619	26.60
Susanna Moll Kammerich	PSOE	102,887	25.43
María Salom Coll	PP	75,485	18.66
• Pep Malagrava Rigo	UP–VP	73,961	18.28
• Rosa Cursach Salas	UP–VP	73,256	18.10
• Pedro Luis Ribas Dietrich	Cs	70,229	17.36
• Miguel Ángel Ramis Socías	PP	64,068	15.84
• Beatriz Medina Muñoz-Torrero	Cs	61,718	15.26
• Antonio Salvá Verd	Vox	46,619	11.52
• Manuela Cañadas Pinilla	Vox	37,798	9.34
• Rafel Alexandre Ballester Riutort	El Pi	15,798	3.91
• Juana Xamena Terrasa	El Pi	13,891	3.43
• Marina Mir García	PACMA	11,624	2.87
• José Manuel Miñano Linde	PACMA	6,971	1.72
• Irina Martínez Valero	Recortes Cero–GV	1,914	0.47
• Maria del Carmen Rodriguez Nieto	PUM+J	1,303	0.32
• Jaume Bonet Moll	VIA	1,231	0.30
Blank ballots		6,766	1.67
Total		404,540	
Valid votes		404,540	97.49
Invalid votes		10,414	2.51
Votes cast / turnout		414,954	66.02
Abstentions		213,607	33.98
Registered voters		628,561	

=== 2016 ===
Summary of the 26 June 2016 Senate of Spain election results in Mallorca
Candidates	Parties and coalitions	Popular vote	
Candidates	Parties and coalitions	Votes	%
Miguel Ángel Ramis Socías	PP	127,994	35.52
Catalina Soler Torres	PP	125,126	34.73
Margarita Quetglas Quesada	Podemos–EUIB–Més	85,261	23.66
• Juan José Martínez Riera	Podemos–EUIB–Més	76,393	21.20
• Natalia Troya Isern	PSOE	74,316	20.62
• Francisco Ducrós Salvá	PSOE	68,615	19.04
• Francisco Javier Giménez Borrás	Cs	44,018	12.22
• Laura Rodeño Hernández	Cs	41,179	11.43
• Diana María Martín Hämphälä	PACMA	8,651	2.40
• Josep de Luis Ferrer	SI	7,973	2.21
• Maria Loreto Amorós i Rotger	SI	6,902	1.91
• Arturo Arévalo González	PACMA	5,698	1.58
• Juan José Fernández Panadero	Recortes Cero–GV	1,604	0.45
• Ana María Mingolla López	Recortes Cero–GV	1,326	0.37
• Antonio Romero García	UPyD	1,023	0.28
• Gaspar Buades Rul·lan	PFyV	807	0.22
• Francina Catalina Martí Capellá	UPyD	804	0.22
• Mª Amalia Schmidt Gil Moreno de Mora	PFyV	661	0.18
Blank ballots		8,166	2.27
Total		360,333	
Valid votes		360,333	97.47
Invalid votes		9,338	2.53
Votes cast / turnout		369,671	60.96
Abstentions		236,788	39.04
Registered voters		606,459	

=== 2015 ===
Summary of the 20 December 2015 Senate of Spain election results in Mallorca
Candidates	Parties and coalitions	Popular vote	
Candidates	Parties and coalitions	Votes	%
Miguel Ángel Ramis Socías	PP	108,368	29.09
Catalina Soler Torres	PP	104,558	28.06
Margarita Quetglas Quesada	Podemos	77,420	20.78
• José Antonio Manchado Lozano	PSOE	67,836	18.21
• Tomás Fernández González	Podemos	67,818	18.20
• Natalia Troya Isern	PSOE	63,547	17.06
• Javier Antonio González García	Cs	45,088	12.10
• Laura Rodeño Hernández	Cs	41,169	11.05
• Sara Margarita Martín Comas	Més	33,103	8.88
• Salvador Colomé Costa	Més	27,424	7.36
• Rafel Alexandre Ballester Riutort	El Pi	15,443	4.14
• Lucia Driessen Lladó	El Pi	13,283	3.57
• Rafael Polonio Gómez	IU–UPB	7,267	1.95
• Diana María Martín Hämphälä	PACMA	7,254	1.95
• Josefina Fernández Pérez	IU–UPB	7,245	1.94
• José González Sastre	PACMA	4,408	1.18
• Francisco Alegret Crespí	UPyD	2,026	0.54
• María Victoria Ruiz Martínez	UPyD	1,683	0.45
• Juan José Fernández Panadero	Recortes Cero–GV	1,486	0.40
• Gaspar Buades Rul·lan	PFyV	783	0.21
• Rosalía Cortés Sastre	PFyV	659	0.18
Blank ballots		12,182	3.27
Total		372,581	
Valid votes		372,581	96.77
Invalid votes		12,439	3.23
Votes cast / turnout		385,020	63.68
Abstentions		219,604	36.32
Registered voters		604,624	

=== 1977 ===
Summary of the 15 June 1977 Senate of Spain election results in Mallorca
Parties and alliances	Popular vote			Seats	
Parties and alliances	Votes	%	±pp	Total	+/−
Union of the Democratic Centre (UCD)	279,353	53.55	n/a	2	n/a
Spanish Socialist Workers' Party (PSOE)	142,912	27.40	n/a	1	n/a
People's Alliance (AP)	29,360	5.63	n/a	0	n/a
People's Socialist Party–Socialist Unity (PSP–US)	22,007	4.22	n/a	0	n/a
Communist Party of Spain (PCE)	16,017	3.07	n/a	0	n/a
Balearic Autonomist Union (UAB)	14,402	2.76	n/a	0	n/a
Democratic Union of the Balearic Islands (UDIB)	13,411	2.57	n/a	0	n/a
National Alliance July 18 (AN18)	2,667	0.51	n/a	0	n/a
José Antonio Circles (CJA)	1,508	0.29	n/a	0	n/a
Blank ballots			n/a		
Total	521,637			3	n/a
Valid votes			n/a		
Invalid votes			n/a		
Votes cast / turnout			n/a		
Abstentions			n/a		
Registered voters	337,758				

== Bibliography ==
- Ley 1/1977, de 4 de enero, para la Reforma Política (Fundamental Law 1/1977). Official State Gazette (in Spanish). 4 January 1977. BOE-A-1977-165.
- Real Decreto-ley 20/1977, de 18 de marzo, sobre Normas Electorales (Royal Decree-Law 20/1977). Official State Gazette (in Spanish). 18 March 1977. BOE-A-1977-7445.
- Constitución Española (Constitution). Official State Gazette (in Spanish). 27 December 1978. BOE-A-1978-31229.
- Ley Orgánica 5/1985, de 19 de junio, del Régimen Electoral General (Organic Law 5/1985). Official State Gazette (in Spanish). 19 June 1985. BOE-A-1985-11672.
- Carreras de Odriozola, Albert; Tafunell Sambola, Xavier (2005) [1989]. Estadísticas históricas de España, siglos XIX-XX (PDF) (in Spanish). Vol. 1 (II ed.). Bilbao: Fundación BBVA. pp. 1072–1097. ISBN 84-96515-00-1. Archived from the original (PDF) on 24 September 2015.
