= Balearic Islands (Congress of Deputies constituency) =

Electoral constituency in Spain

Coordinates: 39°30′N 3°00′W

- Congress of Deputies; Electoral constituency
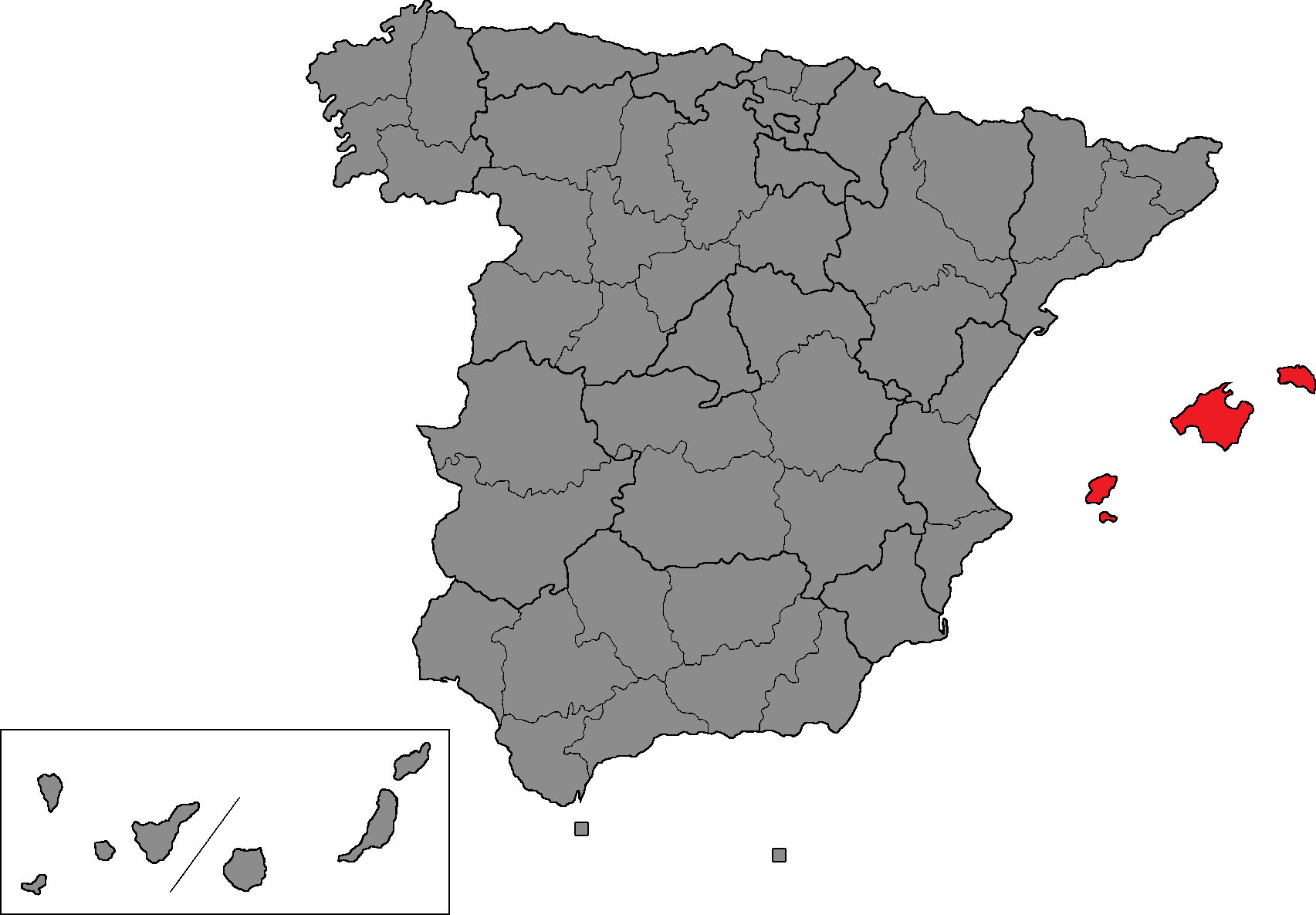
- Location of Balearic Islands within Spain
- Province: Balearic Islands
- Autonomous community: Balearic Islands
- Population: ▲1,221,403 (2024)
- Electorate: ▲828,755 (2023)
- Major settlements: Palma, Calvià, Ibiza

Current constituency
- Created: 1977
- Seats: 6 (1977–1993); 7 (1993–2004); 8 (2004–present)
- Members: PP (3); PSOE (3); Sumar (1); Vox (1)

The Balearic Islands (Catalan: Illes Balears, Spanish: Islas Baleares)—Balearics until 2000 (Spanish: Baleares, Catalan: Balears)—are one of the 52 constituencies represented in the Congress of Deputies, the lower chamber of the Spanish parliament, the Cortes Generales. The constituency (whose boundaries correspond with those of the homonymous province) currently elects eight deputies. The electoral system uses the D'Hondt method and closed-list proportional voting, with a minimum threshold of three percent.

== Electoral system ==
The constituency was created as per the Political Reform Law and was first contested in the 1977 general election. The Law provided for the provinces of Spain to be established as multi-member districts in the Congress of Deputies, with this regulation being maintained under the Spanish Constitution of 1978. Additionally, the Constitution requires for any modification of the provincial limits to be approved under an organic law, needing an absolute majority in the Cortes Generales.

Voting is based on universal suffrage, comprising all Spanish nationals over 18 years of age with full political rights, provided that they have not been deprived of the right to vote by a final sentence. The only exception was in 1977, when this was limited to nationals over 21 years of age and in full enjoyment of their political and civil rights. Amendments in 2011 required non-resident citizens to apply for voting, a system known as "begged" voting (Spanish: Voto rogado). which was abolished in 2022. Further, amendments in 2018 granted the right to vote to those legally incapacitated. The Congress of Deputies has a minimum of 300 and a maximum of 400 seats, with electoral provisions fixing its size at 350. Of these, 348 are elected in 50 multi-member constituencies corresponding to the provinces of Spain—each of which is assigned an initial minimum of two seats and the remaining 248 distributed in proportion to population—using the D'Hondt method and closed-list proportional voting, with a three percent-threshold of valid votes (including blank ballots) in each constituency. The remaining two seats are allocated to Ceuta and Melilla as single-member districts elected by plurality voting. The use of this electoral method may result in a higher effective threshold depending on district magnitude and vote distribution. The law does not provide for by-elections to fill vacant seats; instead, any vacancies arising after the proclamation of candidates and during the legislative term are filled by the next candidates on the party lists or, when required, by designated substitutes.

The electoral law allows for parties and federations registered in the interior ministry, alliances and groupings of electors to present lists of candidates. Parties and federations intending to form an alliance are required to inform the relevant electoral commission within 10 days of the election call—15 before 1985—whereas groupings of electors need to secure the signature of at least one percent of the electorate in the constituencies for which they seek election—one permille of the electorate, with a compulsory minimum of 500 signatures, until 1985—disallowing electors from signing for more than one list. Also since 2011, parties, federations or alliances that have not obtained a mandate in either chamber of the Cortes at the preceding election are required to secure the signature of at least 0.1 percent of electors in the aforementioned constituencies. Amendments in 2007 required a balanced composition of men and women in the electoral lists, so that candidates of either sex made up at least 40 percent of the total composition; further amendments in 2024 required the use of a zipper system.

== Deputies ==
Deputies 1977–present
Key to parties UPM/UP Podemos Sumar PSOE Cs UCD PP CP AP Vox
Legislature	Election	Distribution
Constituent	1977	2 / 4
1st	1979	2 / 4
2nd	1982	3 / 3
3rd	1986	3 / 3
4th	1989	3 / 3
5th	1993	3 / 4
6th	1996	3 / 4
7th	2000	2 / 5
8th	2004	4 / 4
9th	2008	4 / 4
10th	2011	3 / 5
11th	2015	2 / 2 / 1 / 3
12th	2016	2 / 2 / 1 / 3
13th	2019 (Apr)	2 / 3 / 1 / 1 / 1
14th	2019 (Nov)	2 / 2 / 2 / 2
15th	2023	1 / 3 / 3 / 1

== General elections ==
=== 2026 ===
Summary of the 29 November 2026 Congress of Deputies election results in the Balearic Islands
Parties and alliances	Popular vote			Seats	
Parties and alliances	Votes	%	±pp	Total	+/−
People's Party (PP)					
Socialist Party of the Balearic Islands (PSIB–PSOE)					
Now More–Broad Front (Aramés–EU–MS)^{1}					
Vox (Vox)					
Workers' Front (FO)					
Communist Party of the Workers of Spain (PCTE)					
The Party is Over (SALF)			New		
Blank ballots					
Total				8	±0
Valid votes					
Invalid votes					
Votes cast / turnout					
Abstentions					
Registered voters	870,718				
Sources
Footnotes: ^{1} Now More–Broad Front results are compared to the combined totals of More for Mallorca–More for Menorca–Unite and Zero Cuts in the 2023 election.

=== 2023 ===
Summary of the 23 July 2023 Congress of Deputies election results in the Balearic Islands
Parties and alliances	Popular vote			Seats	
Parties and alliances	Votes	%	±pp	Total	+/−
People's Party (PP)	179,303	35.63	+12.79	3	+1
Socialist Party of the Balearic Islands (PSIB–PSOE)	151,786	30.16	+4.72	3	+1
More for Mallorca–More for Menorca–Unite (Més–MxMe–Sumar)^{1}	83,487	16.59	–7.89	1	–1
Vox (Vox)	76,547	15.21	–1.86	1	–1
Animalist Party with the Environment (PACMA)^{2}	4,969	0.99	–0.38	0	±0
Workers' Front (FO)	1,039	0.21	New	0	±0
Zero Cuts (Recortes Cero)	726	0.14	–0.07	0	±0
Communist Party of the Workers of Spain (PCTE)	719	0.14	New	0	±0
Blank ballots	4,704	0.93	–0.10		
Total	503,280			8	±0
Valid votes	503,280	99.03	–0.01		
Invalid votes	4,953	0.97	+0.01		
Votes cast / turnout	508,233	61.32	+4.51		
Abstentions	320,522	38.68	–4.51		
Registered voters	828,755				
Sources
Footnotes: ^{1} More for Mallorca–More for Menorca–Unite results are compared to the combined totals of United We Can, More Left and More Country in the November 2019 election.; ^{2} Animalist Party with the Environment results are compared to Animalist Party Against Mistreatment of Animals totals in the November 2019 election.

=== November 2019 ===
Summary of the 10 November 2019 Congress of Deputies election results in the Balearic Islands
Parties and alliances	Popular vote			Seats	
Parties and alliances	Votes	%	±pp	Total	+/−
Spanish Socialist Workers' Party (PSOE)	115,567	25.44	–0.92	2	–1
People's Party (PP)	103,722	22.84	+5.99	2	+1
United We Can (Podemos–EUIB)	82,225	18.10	+0.26	2	±0
Vox (Vox)	77,520	17.07	+5.77	2	+1
Citizens–Party of the Citizenry (Cs)	33,451	7.36	–10.06	0	–1
More Left (Més–MxMe–esquerra)^{1}	18,295	4.03	–0.83	0	±0
More Country (Más País)	10,652	2.35	New	0	±0
Animalist Party Against Mistreatment of Animals (PACMA)	6,207	1.37	–0.34	0	±0
Zero Cuts–Green Group (Recortes Cero–GV)	947	0.21	–0.02	0	±0
For a Fairer World (PUM+J)	573	0.13	±0.00	0	±0
Libertarian Party (P–LIB)	372	0.08	New	0	±0
Blank ballots	4,668	1.03	+0.13		
Total	454,199			8	±0
Valid votes	454,199	99.04	+0.11		
Invalid votes	4,393	0.96	–0.11		
Votes cast / turnout	458,592	56.81	–8.56		
Abstentions	348,578	43.19	+8.56		
Registered voters	807,170				
Sources
Footnotes: ^{1} More Left results are compared to Progressive Voices totals in the April 2019 election.

=== April 2019 ===
Summary of the 28 April 2019 Congress of Deputies election results in the Balearic Islands
Parties and alliances	Popular vote			Seats	
Parties and alliances	Votes	%	±pp	Total	+/−
Spanish Socialist Workers' Party (PSOE)	136,698	26.36	+6.27	3	+1
United We Can (Podemos–EUIB)	92,477	17.84	–7.57	2	±0
Citizens–Party of the Citizenry (Cs)	90,340	17.42	+2.85	1	±0
People's Party (PP)	87,352	16.85	–18.23	1	–2
Vox (Vox)	58,567	11.30	New	1	+1
Progressive Voices (Ara–Més–esquerra)	25,191	4.86	New	0	±0
El Pi–Proposal for the Isles (El Pi)	11,692	2.25	New	0	±0
Animalist Party Against Mistreatment of Animals (PACMA)	8,864	1.71	+0.15	0	±0
Zero Cuts–Green Group (Recortes Cero–GV)	1,197	0.23	–0.12	0	±0
Act (PACT)	796	0.15	New	0	±0
For a Fairer World (PUM+J)	686	0.13	New	0	±0
Blank ballots	4,647	0.90	–0.01		
Total	518,507			8	±0
Valid votes	518,507	98.93	–0.08		
Invalid votes	5,594	1.07	+0.08		
Votes cast / turnout	524,101	65.37	+4.64		
Abstentions	277,620	34.63	–4.64		
Registered voters	801,721				

=== 2016 ===
Summary of the 26 June 2016 Congress of Deputies election results in the Balearic Islands
Parties and alliances	Popular vote			Seats	
Parties and alliances	Votes	%	±pp	Total	+/−
People's Party (PP)	163,045	35.08	+6.02	3	±0
United We Can–More (Podemos–EUIB–Més)^{1}	118,082	25.41	–7.03	2	±0
Spanish Socialist Workers' Party (PSOE)	93,363	20.09	+1.78	2	±0
Citizens–Party of the Citizenry (C's)	67,700	14.57	–0.21	1	±0
Sovereignty for the Isles (SI)	7,418	1.60	New	0	±0
Animalist Party Against Mistreatment of Animals (PACMA)	7,266	1.56	+0.50	0	±0
Zero Cuts–Green Group (Recortes Cero–GV)	1,644	0.35	+0.11	0	±0
Union, Progress and Democracy (UPyD)	1,197	0.26	–0.21	0	±0
Family and Life Party (PFyV)	846	0.18	+0.03	0	±0
Blank ballots	4,226	0.91	+0.08		
Total	464,787			8	±0
Valid votes	464,787	99.01	–0.03		
Invalid votes	4,650	0.99	+0.03		
Votes cast / turnout	469,437	60.73	–2.62		
Abstentions	303,502	39.27	+2.62		
Registered voters	772,939				
Sources
Footnotes: ^{1} United We Can–More results are compared to the combined totals of We Can, More for the Balearic Islands and United Left–Balearic Popular Unity in the 2015 election.

=== 2015 ===
Summary of the 20 December 2015 Congress of Deputies election results in the Balearic Islands
Parties and alliances	Popular vote			Seats	
Parties and alliances	Votes	%	±pp	Total	+/−
People's Party (PP)	140,640	29.06	–20.53	3	–2
We Can (Podemos)	111,628	23.07	New	2	+2
Spanish Socialist Workers' Party (PSOE)	88,635	18.31	–10.56	2	–1
Citizens–Party of the Citizenry (C's)	71,551	14.78	New	1	+1
More for the Balearic Islands (Més)^{1}	33,877	7.00	–0.17	0	±0
El Pi–Proposal for the Isles (El Pi)	12,910	2.67	New	0	±0
United Left–Balearic Popular Unity (IU–UPB)	11,451	2.37	–2.57	0	±0
Animalist Party Against Mistreatment of Animals (PACMA)	5,114	1.06	+0.23	0	±0
Union, Progress and Democracy (UPyD)	2,276	0.47	–3.76	0	±0
Zero Cuts–Green Group (Recortes Cero–GV)	1,177	0.24	New	0	±0
Family and Life Party (PFyV)	714	0.15	–0.02	0	±0
Blank ballots	3,997	0.83	–0.98		
Total	483,970			8	±0
Valid votes	483,970	99.04	+0.66		
Invalid votes	4,696	0.96	–0.66		
Votes cast / turnout	488,666	63.35	+2.39		
Abstentions	282,715	36.65	–2.39		
Registered voters	771,381				
Sources
Footnotes: ^{1} More for the Balearic Islands results are compared to PSM–Initiative Greens–Agreement–Equo totals in the 2011 election.

=== 2011 ===
Summary of the 20 November 2011 Congress of Deputies election results in the Balearic Islands
Parties and alliances	Popular vote			Seats	
Parties and alliances	Votes	%	±pp	Total	+/−
People's Party (PP)	217,327	49.59	+5.62	5	+1
Spanish Socialist Workers' Party (PSOE)	126,512	28.87	–15.36	3	–1
PSM–Initiative Greens–Agreement–Equo (PSM–IV–ExM–eQuo)	31,417	7.17	+1.80	0	±0
United Left of the Balearic Islands: Plural Left (EUIB)	21,668	4.94	+2.10	0	±0
Union, Progress and Democracy (UPyD)	18,525	4.23	+3.57	0	±0
Republican Left (esquerra)	4,681	1.07	New	0	±0
Blank Seats (EB)	4,271	0.97	New	0	±0
Animalist Party Against Mistreatment of Animals (PACMA)	3,641	0.83	+0.58	0	±0
For a Fairer World (PUM+J)	1,093	0.25	+0.16	0	±0
Family and Life Party (PFyV)	746	0.17	+0.11	0	±0
Communist Unification of Spain (UCE)	450	0.10	New	0	±0
Blank ballots	7,941	1.81	+0.54		
Total	438,272			8	±0
Valid votes	438,272	98.38	–0.77		
Invalid votes	7,216	1.62	+0.77		
Votes cast / turnout	445,488	60.96	–6.61		
Abstentions	285,252	39.04	+6.61		
Registered voters	730,740				

=== 2008 ===
Summary of the 9 March 2008 Congress of Deputies election results in the Balearic Islands
Parties and alliances	Popular vote			Seats	
Parties and alliances	Votes	%	±pp	Total	+/−
Spanish Socialist Workers' Party (PSOE)	209,451	44.23	+4.75	4	±0
People's Party (PP)	208,246	43.97	–1.92	4	±0
Unity for the Isles (UIB)^{1}	25,454	5.37	n/a	0	±0
United Left–The Greens (EU–EV)^{1}	13,447	2.84	n/a	0	±0
Union, Progress and Democracy (UPyD)	3,107	0.66	New	0	±0
The Greens–Green Group (LV–GV)	2,098	0.44	New	0	±0
Anti-Bullfighting Party Against Mistreatment of Animals (PACMA)	1,173	0.25	New	0	±0
Citizens for Blank Votes (CenB)	1,010	0.21	–0.13	0	±0
Citizens–Party of the Citizenry (C's)	723	0.15	New	0	±0
For a Fairer World (PUM+J)	425	0.09	New	0	±0
Communist Party of the Peoples of Spain (PCPE)	415	0.09	New	0	±0
Islander Party of the Balearic Islands (PIIB)	360	0.08	New	0	±0
Spanish Phalanx of the CNSO (FE de las JONS)	334	0.07	±0.00	0	±0
Family and Life Party (PFyV)	284	0.06	New	0	±0
National Democracy (DN)	250	0.05	±0.00	0	±0
Humanist Party (PH)	206	0.04	New	0	±0
Workers for Democracy Coalition (TD)	159	0.03	–0.06	0	±0
Authentic Phalanx (FA)	158	0.03	New	0	±0
Balearic Alliance (ABA)	145	0.03	New	0	±0
Spanish Alternative (AES)	112	0.02	New	0	±0
Blank ballots	6,026	1.27	–0.66		
Total	473,583			8	±0
Valid votes	473,583	99.15	–0.14		
Invalid votes	4,079	0.85	+0.14		
Votes cast / turnout	477,662	67.57	–1.27		
Abstentions	229,276	32.43	+1.27		
Registered voters	706,938				
Sources
Footnotes: ^{1} Within the Progressives for the Balearic Islands alliance in the 2004 election.

=== 2004 ===
Summary of the 14 March 2004 Congress of Deputies election results in the Balearic Islands
Parties and alliances	Popular vote			Seats	
Parties and alliances	Votes	%	±pp	Total	+/−
People's Party (PP)	215,737	45.89	–7.98	4	–1
Spanish Socialist Workers' Party (PSOE)	185,623	39.48	+10.20	4	+2
Progressives for the Balearic Islands (PSM–EN, EU, EV, ER)^{1}	40,289	8.57	–4.07	0	±0
Majorcan Union (UM)	10,558	2.25	+0.15	0	±0
European Green Group (GVE)	2,662	0.57	New	0	±0
Citizens for Blank Votes (CenB)	1,588	0.34	New	0	±0
Independent Social Group (ASI)	1,237	0.26	New	0	±0
Republican Left (IR)	825	0.18	New	0	±0
Union of Centrists of Menorca (UCM)	751	0.16	New	0	±0
Balearic People's Union (UPB)	411	0.09	–0.04	0	±0
Workers for Democracy Coalition (TD)	407	0.09	–0.02	0	±0
Spanish Phalanx of the CNSO (FE de las JONS)^{2}	325	0.07	+0.02	0	±0
The Phalanx (FE)	272	0.06	±0.00	0	±0
National Democracy (DN)	227	0.05	New	0	±0
Republican Social Movement (MSR)	134	0.03	New	0	±0
Blank ballots	9,073	1.93	+0.44		
Total	470,119			8	+1
Valid votes	470,119	99.29	–0.05		
Invalid votes	3,362	0.71	+0.05		
Votes cast / turnout	473,481	68.84	+7.41		
Abstentions	214,353	31.16	–7.41		
Registered voters	652,009				
Sources
Footnotes: ^{1} Progressives for the Balearic Islands results are compared to the combined totals of Socialist Party of Mallorca–Nationalist Agreement, United Left of the Balearic Islands, The Greens of the Balearic Islands and Republican Left of Catalonia in the 2000 election.; ^{2} Spanish Phalanx of the CNSO results are compared to Independent Spanish Phalanx–Phalanx 2000 totals in the 2000 election.

=== 2000 ===
Summary of the 12 March 2000 Congress of Deputies election results in the Balearic Islands
Parties and alliances	Popular vote			Seats	
Parties and alliances	Votes	%	±pp	Total	+/−
People's Party (PP)	214,348	53.87	+7.46	5	+1
Spanish Socialist Workers' Party–Progressives (PSOE–p)	116,515	29.28	–6.67	2	–1
PSM–Nationalist Agreement (PSM–EN)	23,482	5.90	+0.19	0	±0
United Left of the Balearic Islands (EU)	15,928	4.00	–3.69	0	±0
The Greens of the Balearic Islands (EVIB)	9,556	2.40	+0.18	0	±0
Majorcan Union–Independents of Menorca (UM–INME)	8,372	2.10	+0.49	0	±0
Republican Left of Catalonia (ERC)	1,340	0.34	–0.08	0	±0
Balearic People's Union (UPB)	524	0.13	New	0	±0
Workers for Democracy Coalition (TD)	423	0.11	+0.02	0	±0
Centrist Union–Democratic and Social Centre (UC–CDS)	341	0.09	–0.01	0	±0
Balearic Islands Renewal Party (PRIB)	334	0.08	New	0	±0
Spain 2000 Platform (ES2000)	221	0.06	New	0	±0
The Phalanx (FE)	220	0.06	New	0	±0
Independent Spanish Phalanx–Phalanx 2000 (FEI–FE 2000)	182	0.05	New	0	±0
Catalan State (EC)	169	0.04	New	0	±0
Blank ballots	5,943	1.49	+0.49		
Total	397,898			7	±0
Valid votes	397,898	99.34	–0.08		
Invalid votes	2,661	0.66	+0.08		
Votes cast / turnout	400,559	61.43	–10.20		
Abstentions	251,450	38.57	+10.20		
Registered voters	652,009				

=== 1996 ===
Summary of the 3 March 1996 Congress of Deputies election results in the Balearics
Parties and alliances	Popular vote			Seats	
Parties and alliances	Votes	%	±pp	Total	+/−
People's Party (PP)	194,859	45.13	–1.28	4	±0
Spanish Socialist Workers' Party (PSOE)	155,244	35.95	+1.98	3	±0
United Left of the Balearic Islands (IU)	33,224	7.69	+1.73	0	±0
Nationalists of the Balearic Islands (PSM–ENE)	24,644	5.71	+0.83	0	±0
The Greens of the Balearic Islands (EVIB)	9,539	2.21	+0.04	0	±0
Majorcan Union (UM)	6,943	1.61	–0.83	0	±0
Republican Left of Catalonia (ERC)	1,802	0.42	–0.27	0	±0
Centrist Union (UC)	449	0.10	–1.75	0	±0
Republican Coalition (CR)^{1}	384	0.09	±0.00	0	±0
Balearic Alliance (ABA)	379	0.09	New	0	±0
Blank ballots	4,318	1.00	+0.16		
Total	431,785			7	±0
Valid votes	431,785	99.42	–0.02		
Invalid votes	2,503	0.58	+0.02		
Votes cast / turnout	434,288	71.63	–0.93		
Abstentions	172,041	28.31	+0.93		
Registered voters	606,329				
Sources
Footnotes: ^{1} Republican Coalition results are compared to Coalition for a New Socialist Party totals in the 1993 election.

=== 1993 ===
Summary of the 6 June 1993 Congress of Deputies election results in the Balearics
Parties and alliances	Popular vote			Seats	
Parties and alliances	Votes	%	±pp	Total	+/−
People's Party (PP)	191,461	46.41	+5.75	4	+1
Spanish Socialist Workers' Party (PSOE)	140,145	33.97	–0.51	3	±0
United Left of the Islands (IU)	24,574	5.96	+0.87	0	±0
Nationalists of the Balearic Islands (PSM–ENE)	20,118	4.88	+2.56	0	±0
Mallorcan, Menorcan and Pityusic Union (UMMP)	10,053	2.44	New	0	±0
The Greens of the Balearic Islands (EVIB)^{1}	8,971	2.17	–0.37	0	±0
Democratic and Social Centre (CDS)	7,648	1.85	–7.34	0	±0
Republican Left of Catalonia (ERC)	2,848	0.69	New	0	±0
Ruiz-Mateos Group–European Democratic Alliance (ARM–ADE)	1,268	0.31	–2.22	0	±0
Natural Law Party (PLN)	550	0.13	New	0	±0
Spanish Balearic Alternative (ABE)	416	0.10	New	0	±0
Revolutionary Workers' Party (POR)	369	0.09	–0.04	0	±0
Coalition for a New Socialist Party (CNPS)^{2}	357	0.09	±0.00	0	±0
Radical Balearic Party (PRB)	282	0.07	–0.05	0	±0
Communist Unification of Spain (UCE)	0	0.00	New	0	±0
Blank ballots	3,485	0.84	–0.02		
Total	412,545			7	+1
Valid votes	412,545	99.44	+0.61		
Invalid votes	2,316	0.56	–0.61		
Votes cast / turnout	414,861	72.56	+9.02		
Abstentions	156,851	27.44	–9.02		
Registered voters	571,712				
Sources
Footnotes: ^{1} The Greens of the Balearic Islands results are compared to The Greens–Green List totals in the 1989 election.; ^{2} Coalition for a New Socialist Party results are compared to Alliance for the Republic totals in the 1989 election.

=== 1989 ===
Summary of the 29 October 1989 Congress of Deputies election results in the Balearics
Parties and alliances	Popular vote			Seats	
Parties and alliances	Votes	%	±pp	Total	+/−
People's Party (PP)^{1}	140,163	40.66	+6.35	3	±0
Spanish Socialist Workers' Party (PSOE)	118,833	34.48	–5.80	3	±0
Democratic and Social Centre (CDS)	31,671	9.19	–2.10	0	±0
United Left (IU)	17,555	5.09	+2.76	0	±0
The Greens–Green List (EV–LV)	8,762	2.54	New	0	±0
Ruiz-Mateos Group (Ruiz-Mateos)	8,709	2.53	New	0	±0
Nationalist Left (PSM–ENE)	7,989	2.32	+0.11	0	±0
Balearic Union (UB)	2,883	0.84	New	0	±0
Workers' Socialist Party (PST)	1,621	0.47	New	0	±0
Communist Party of the Peoples of Spain (PCPE)	1,050	0.30	New	0	±0
Workers' Party of Spain–Communist Unity (PTE–UC)^{2}	772	0.22	–0.28	0	±0
Spanish Phalanx of the CNSO (FE–JONS)	541	0.16	–0.15	0	±0
Revolutionary Workers' Party of Spain (PORE)	431	0.13	–0.05	0	±0
Balearic Radical Party (PRB)	398	0.12	New	0	±0
Alliance for the Republic (AxR)^{3}	327	0.09	–0.08	0	±0
Social Democratic Coalition (CSD)	0	0.00	New	0	±0
Blank ballots	2,976	0.86	+0.14		
Total	344,681			6	±0
Valid votes	344,681	98.83	+1.01		
Invalid votes	4,098	1.17	–1.01		
Votes cast / turnout	348,779	63.54	–2.48		
Abstentions	200,160	36.46	+2.48		
Registered voters	548,939				
Sources
Footnotes: ^{1} People's Party results are compared to People's Coalition totals in the 1986 election.; ^{2} Workers' Party of Spain–Communist Unity results are compared to Communists' Unity Board totals in the 1986 election.; ^{3} Alliance for the Republic results are compared to Internationalist Socialist Workers' Party totals in the 1986 election.

=== 1986 ===
Summary of the 22 June 1986 Congress of Deputies election results in the Balearics
Parties and alliances	Popular vote			Seats	
Parties and alliances	Votes	%	±pp	Total	+/−
Spanish Socialist Workers' Party (PSOE)	137,363	40.28	–0.17	3	±0
People's Coalition (AP–PDP–PL)^{1}	117,007	34.31	–3.40	3	±0
Democratic and Social Centre (CDS)	38,510	11.29	+6.04	0	±0
Democratic Reformist Party (PRD)	24,379	7.15	New	0	±0
United Left (IU)^{2}	7,942	2.33	+0.66	0	±0
Socialist Party of Mallorca–Nationalist Left (PSM–EN)	7,539	2.21	–0.21	0	±0
Communists' Unity Board (MUC)	1,713	0.50	New	0	±0
Communist Unification of Spain (UCE)	1,105	0.32	+0.17	0	±0
Spanish Phalanx of the CNSO (FE–JONS)	1,062	0.31	+0.31	0	±0
Republican Popular Unity (UPR)^{3}	800	0.23	+0.10	0	±0
Revolutionary Workers' Party of Spain (PORE)	601	0.18	New	0	±0
Internationalist Socialist Workers' Party (POSI)	583	0.17	New	0	±0
Party of the Communists of Catalonia (PCC)	0	0.00	New	0	±0
Blank ballots	2,452	0.72	+0.12		
Total	341,056			6	±0
Valid votes	341,056	97.82	+2.06		
Invalid votes	7,592	2.18	–2.06		
Votes cast / turnout	348,648	66.02	–13.72		
Abstentions	179,474	33.98	+13.72		
Registered voters	528,122				
Sources
Footnotes: ^{1} People's Coalition results are compared to People's Alliance–People's Democratic Party totals in the 1982 election.; ^{2} United Left results are compared to Communist Party of Spain totals in the 1982 election.; ^{3} Republican Popular Unity results are compared to Communist Party of Spain (Marxist–Leninist) totals in the 1982 election.

=== 1982 ===
Summary of the 28 October 1982 Congress of Deputies election results in the Balearics
Parties and alliances	Popular vote			Seats	
Parties and alliances	Votes	%	±pp	Total	+/−
Spanish Socialist Workers' Party (PSOE)	144,232	40.45	+11.07	3	+1
People's Alliance–People's Democratic Party (AP–PDP)^{1}	134,444	37.71	+28.54	3	+3
Union of the Democratic Centre (UCD)	37,148	10.42	–38.50	0	–4
Democratic and Social Centre (CDS)	18,722	5.25	New	0	±0
Socialist Party of Mallorca–Nationalists of the Islands (PSM)	8,633	2.42	–0.92	0	±0
Communist Party of Spain (PCE)	5,962	1.67	–3.24	0	±0
Workers' Socialist Party (PST)	1,716	0.48	New	0	±0
Spanish Communist Workers' Party (PCOE)	1,178	0.33	New	0	±0
New Force (FN)^{2}	879	0.25	–0.80	0	±0
Communist Unification of Spain (UCE)	518	0.15	New	0	±0
Spanish Solidarity (SE)	509	0.14	New	0	±0
Communist Party of Spain (Marxist–Leninist) (PCE (m–l))	450	0.13	New	0	±0
Mallorcan Left (EM)	0	0.00	New	0	±0
Revolutionary Communist League (LCR)	0	0.00	–0.30	0	±0
Spanish Phalanx of the CNSO (FE–JONS)	0	0.00	New	0	±0
Blank ballots	2,148	0.60	+0.22		
Total	356,539			6	±0
Valid votes	356,539	95.76	+0.37		
Invalid votes	15,791	4.24	–0.37		
Votes cast / turnout	372,330	79.74	+10.09		
Abstentions	94,579	20.26	–10.09		
Registered voters	466,909				
Sources
Footnotes: ^{1} People's Alliance–People's Democratic Party results are compared to Democratic Coalition totals in the 1979 election.; ^{2} New Force results are compared to National Union totals in the 1979 election.

=== 1979 ===
Summary of the 1 March 1979 Congress of Deputies election results in the Balearics
Parties and alliances	Popular vote			Seats	
Parties and alliances	Votes	%	±pp	Total	+/−
Union of the Democratic Centre (UCD)	146,927	48.92	–2.97	4	±0
Spanish Socialist Workers' Party (PSOE)^{1}	88,232	29.38	+0.89	2	±0
Democratic Coalition (CD)^{2}	27,554	9.17	+0.14	0	±0
Communist Party of Spain (PCE)	14,757	4.91	+0.45	0	±0
Socialists of Mallorca and Menorca (SMiM)	10,022	3.34	New	0	±0
National Union (UN)^{3}	3,165	1.05	+0.86	0	±0
Party of Labour of Spain (PTE)	1,793	0.60	New	0	±0
Workers' Communist Party (PCT)	1,544	0.51	New	0	±0
Carlist Party (PC)	1,257	0.42	New	0	±0
Communist Movement–Organization of Communist Left (MC–OIC)	1,179	0.39	New	0	±0
Workers' Revolutionary Organization (ORT)^{4}	1,070	0.36	+0.15	0	±0
Revolutionary Communist League (LCR)	893	0.30	New	0	±0
Union for the Freedom of Speech (ULE)	804	0.27	New	0	±0
Blank ballots	1,134	0.38	–0.04		
Total	300,331			6	±0
Valid votes	300,331	95.39	–2.62		
Invalid votes	14,519	4.61	+2.62		
Votes cast / turnout	314,850	69.65	–9.18		
Abstentions	137,211	30.35	+9.18		
Registered voters	452,061				
Sources
Footnotes: ^{1} Spanish Socialist Workers' Party results are compared to the combined totals of Spanish Socialist Workers' Party and People's Socialist Party–Socialist Unity in the 1977 election.; ^{2} Democratic Coalition results are compared to People's Alliance totals in the 1977 election.; ^{3} National Union results are compared to José Antonio Circles totals in the 1977 election.; ^{4} Workers' Revolutionary Organization are compared to Workers' Electoral Group totals in the 1977 election.

=== 1977 ===
Summary of the 15 June 1977 Congress of Deputies election results in the Balearics
Parties and alliances	Popular vote			Seats	
Parties and alliances	Votes	%	±pp	Total	+/−
Union of the Democratic Centre (UCD)	163,536	51.89	n/a	4	n/a
Spanish Socialist Workers' Party (PSOE)	73,554	23.34	n/a	2	n/a
People's Alliance (AP)	28,472	9.03	n/a	0	n/a
People's Socialist Party–Socialist Unity (PSP–US)	16,244	5.15	n/a	0	n/a
Communist Party of Spain (PCE)	14,046	4.46	n/a	0	n/a
Balearic Autonomist Union (UAB)	11,914	3.78	n/a	0	n/a
Democratic Union of the Balearic Islands (UDIB)	2,946	0.93	n/a	0	n/a
Spanish Social Reform (RSE)	1,067	0.34	n/a	0	n/a
Democratic Left Front (FDI)	775	0.25	n/a	0	n/a
Workers' Electoral Group (AET)	669	0.21	n/a	0	n/a
José Antonio Circles (CJA)	613	0.19	n/a	0	n/a
Blank ballots	1,311	0.42	n/a		
Total	315,147			6	n/a
Valid votes	315,147	98.01	n/a		
Invalid votes	6,405	1.99	n/a		
Votes cast / turnout	321,552	78.83	n/a		
Abstentions	86,374	21.17	n/a		
Registered voters	407,899				

== Bibliography ==
- Ley 1/1977, de 4 de enero, para la Reforma Política (Fundamental Law 1/1977). Official State Gazette (in Spanish). 4 January 1977. BOE-A-1977-165.
- Real Decreto-ley 20/1977, de 18 de marzo, sobre Normas Electorales (Royal Decree-Law 20/1977). Official State Gazette (in Spanish). 18 March 1977. BOE-A-1977-7445.
- Constitución Española (Constitution). Official State Gazette (in Spanish). 27 December 1978. BOE-A-1978-31229.
- Ley Orgánica 5/1985, de 19 de junio, del Régimen Electoral General (Organic Law 5/1985). Official State Gazette (in Spanish). 19 June 1985. BOE-A-1985-11672.
- Carreras de Odriozola, Albert; Tafunell Sambola, Xavier (2005) [1989]. Estadísticas históricas de España, siglos XIX-XX (PDF) (in Spanish). Vol. 1 (II ed.). Bilbao: Fundación BBVA. pp. 1072–1097. ISBN 84-96515-00-1. Archived from the original (PDF) on 24 September 2015.
