= Menorca (Senate constituency) =

Senate of Spain constituency

Coordinates: 39°58′N 4°05′W

- Senate of Spain; Electoral constituency
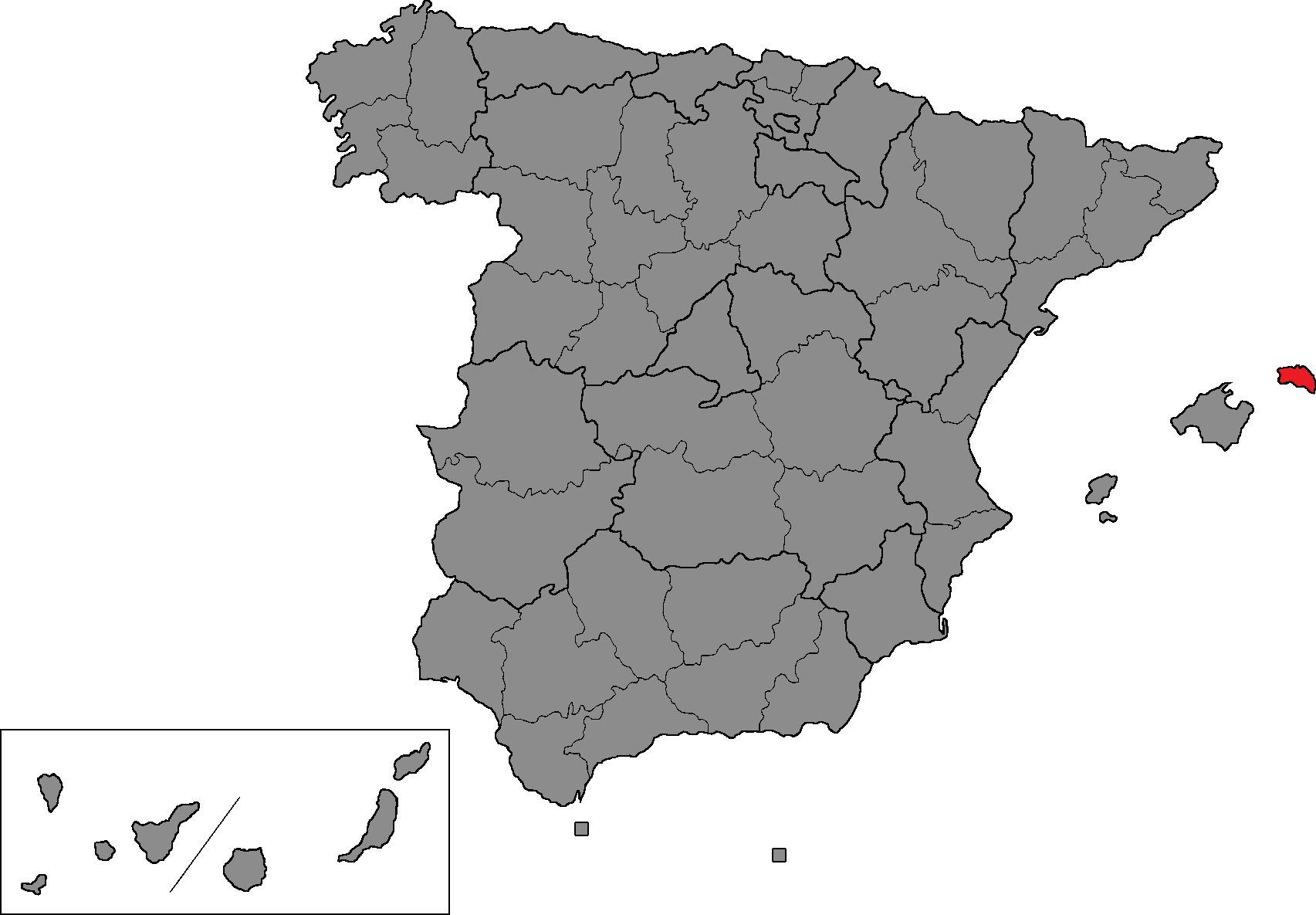
- Location of Menorca within Spain
- Island: Menorca
- Autonomous community: Balearic Islands
- Population: ▲100,323 (2024)
- Electorate: ▲74,582 (2023)
- Major settlements: Ciutadella de Menorca, Mahón

Current constituency
- Created: 1977
- Seats: 1
- Member: PP (1)

Menorca is one of the 60 constituencies represented in the Senate of Spain, the upper chamber of the Spanish parliament, the Cortes Generales. The constituency (whose boundaries correspond to those of the homonymous island) elects one senator. The electoral system uses open-list (Note: Parties can group candidates into lists, although each candidate is treated separately for the purpose of the voting procedure.) partial block voting, with electors voting for individual candidates instead of parties.

== Electoral system ==
The constituency was created as per the Political Reform Law and was first contested in the 1977 general election. The Law provided for the provinces of Spain to be established as multi-member districts in the Senate, with this regulation being maintained under the Spanish Constitution of 1978. Additionally, the Constitution requires for any modification of the provincial limits to be approved under an organic law, needing an absolute majority in the Cortes Generales.

Voting is based on universal suffrage, comprising all Spanish nationals over 18 years of age with full political rights, provided that they have not been deprived of the right to vote by a final sentence. The only exception was in 1977, when this was limited to nationals over 21 years of age and in full enjoyment of their political and civil rights. Amendments in 2011 required non-resident citizens to apply for voting, a system known as "begged" voting (Spanish: Voto rogado). which was abolished in 2022. Further, amendments in 2018 granted the right to vote to those legally incapacitated. 209 Senate seats (207 in 1977, 208 from 1978 to 2026) are elected using open-list partial block voting: voters in constituencies electing four seats can choose up to three candidates; in those with two or three seats, up to two; and in single-member districts, one. Each of the 47 peninsular provinces is allocated four seats, while in insular provinces—such as the Balearic and Canary Islands—the districts are the islands themselves, with the larger ones (Mallorca, Gran Canaria and Tenerife) being allocated three seats each, and the smaller ones (Menorca, Ibiza, Formentera, Fuerteventura, La Gomera, El Hierro, Lanzarote and La Palma) one each. (Note: La Gomera and El Hierro comprised a single constituency for the 1977 election. A constitutional reform in 2026 awarded Formentera an independent senator separate from Ibiza.) Ceuta and Melilla elect two seats each. Until 1985, the law also provided for by-elections to fill Senate seats vacated up to two years into the legislature; subsequently, any vacancies arising after the proclamation of candidates and during the legislative term are filled by the next candidates on the party lists or, when required, by designated substitutes.

The electoral law allows for parties and federations registered in the interior ministry, alliances and groupings of electors to present lists of candidates. Parties and federations intending to form an alliance are required to inform the relevant electoral commission within 10 days of the election call—15 before 1985—whereas groupings of electors need to secure the signature of at least one percent of the electorate in the constituencies for which they seek election—one permille of the electorate, with a compulsory minimum of 500 signatures, until 1985—disallowing electors from signing for more than one list. Also since 2011, parties, federations or alliances that have not obtained a mandate in either chamber of the Cortes at the preceding election are required to secure the signature of at least 0.1 percent of electors in the aforementioned constituencies. Amendments in 2007 required a balanced composition of men and women in the electoral lists, so that candidates of either sex made up at least 40 percent of the total composition; further amendments in 2024 required the use of a zipper system.

== Senators ==
Senators for Menorca 1977–
Key to parties CPM PSOE UCD PP
Legislature	Election	Distribution
Constituent	1977	1
1st	1979	1
2nd	1982	1
3rd	1986	1
4th	1989	1
5th	1993	1
6th	1996	1
7th	2000	1
8th	2004	1
9th	2008	1
10th	2011	1
11th	2015	1
12th	2016	1
13th	2019 (Apr)	1
14th	2019 (Nov)	1
15th	2023	1

== General elections ==
=== 2023 ===
Summary of the 23 July 2023 Senate of Spain election results in Menorca
Parties and alliances	Popular vote			Seats	
Parties and alliances	Votes	%	±pp	Total	+/−
People's Party (PP)	16,222	36.11	+9.14	1	±0
Socialist Party of the Balearic Islands (PSIB–PSOE)	15,156	33.74	+6.85	0	±0
More for Menorca–Unite (MxMe–Sumar)^{1}	8,870	19.75	−7.66	0	±0
Vox (Vox)	3,577	7.96	−0.22	0	±0
Zero Cuts (Recortes Cero)	249	0.55	+0.10	0	±0
Blank ballots (Note: The percentage of blank ballots is calculated over the official number of valid votes cast, irrespective of the total number of votes shown as a result of adding up the individual results for each party.)	848	1.89	−0.01		
Total	44,922			1	±0
Valid votes	44,922	97.47	−0.17		
Invalid votes	1,168	2.53	+0.17		
Votes cast / turnout	46,090	61.80	+6.28		
Abstentions	28,492	38.20	−6.28		
Registered voters	74,582				
Sources
Footnotes: ^{1} More for Menorca–Unite results are compared to the combined totals of United We Can and More for Menorca in the November 2019 election.

=== November 2019 ===
Summary of the 10 November 2019 Senate of Spain election results in Menorca
Parties and alliances	Popular vote			Seats	
Parties and alliances	Votes	%	±pp	Total	+/−
People's Party (PP)	10,406	26.97		1	+1
Spanish Socialist Workers' Party (PSOE)	10,376	26.89		0	−1
United We Can (Podemos–EUIB)	7,266	18.83		0	±0
More Left (Més–esquerra)	3,310	8.58	New	0	±0
Vox (Vox)	3,155	8.18		0	±0
Citizens–Party of the Citizenry (Cs)	2,515	6.52		0	±0
Animalist Party Against Mistreatment of Animals (PACMA)	645	1.67		0	±0
Zero Cuts–Green Group (Recortes Cero–GV)	175	0.45		0	±0
Blank ballots	734	1.90			
Total	38,582			1	±0
Valid votes	38,582	97.64			
Invalid votes	932	2.36			
Votes cast / turnout	39,514	55.52			
Abstentions	31,656	44.48			
Registered voters	71,170				

=== April 2019 ===
Summary of the 28 April 2019 Senate of Spain election results in Menorca
Candidates	Parties and coalitions	Popular vote	
Candidates	Parties and coalitions	Votes	%
Maria del Carme Garcia Querol	PSOE	11,856	26.58
• Aurora Herráiz Águila	PP	8,919	19.99
• Mae de la Concha Garcia-Mauriño	Podemos–EUIB	7,611	17.06
• José Manuel Morales Bosch	Cs	6,897	15.46
• Eduard Riudavets Florit	MxMe	4,524	10.14
• Guillermo Juan Jusué de Olives	Vox	2,468	5.53
• María Elena Pérez de Gracia Jabardo	PACMA	919	2.06
• Joaquin Ferrer Lorenzo	El Pi	440	0.99
• Antonio Triay Castro	Recortes Cero–GV	164	0.37
Blank ballots		815	1.83
Total		44,613	
Valid votes		44,613	96.62
Invalid votes		1,561	3.38
Votes cast / turnout		46,174	65.52
Abstentions		24,295	34.48
Registered voters		70,469	

=== 2016 ===
Summary of the 26 June 2016 Senate of Spain election results in Menorca
Candidates	Parties and coalitions	Popular vote	
Candidates	Parties and coalitions	Votes	%
Juana Francisca Pons Vila	PP	13,255	33.40
• Margarita Juana Benejam Coll	Podemos–EUIB–Més	12,075	30.43
• Miquel Company Pons	PSOE	7,717	19.45
• Manuel Bonmatí Pérez	C's	4,719	11.89
• Catalina Sastre Florit	PACMA	948	2.39
Blank ballots		969	2.44
Total		39,683	
Valid votes		39,683	96.87
Invalid votes		1,283	3.13
Votes cast / turnout		40,966	60.81
Abstentions		26,406	39.19
Registered voters		67,372	

=== 2015 ===
Summary of the 20 December 2015 Senate of Spain election results in Menorca
Candidates	Parties and coalitions	Popular vote	
Candidates	Parties and coalitions	Votes	%
Juana Francisca Pons Vila	PP	11,761	28.62
• Brigida Mora Canet	Podemos	9,657	23.50
• Grácia Mercadal Marqués	PSOE	7,339	17.86
• Manuel Bonmatí Pérez	C's	5,160	12.56
• Pilar Arguimbau Sintes	Som Menorca	4,129	10.05
• Catalina Sastre Florit	PACMA	725	1.76
• Nicolás Bordoy Riera	El Pi	696	1.69
• María Ángeles Fernández Orts	UPyD	242	0.59
Blank ballots		1,381	3.36
Total		41,056	
Valid votes		41,056	96.31
Invalid votes		1,575	3.69
Votes cast / turnout		42,631	63.12
Abstentions		24,904	36.88
Registered voters		67,535	

=== 2011 ===
Summary of the 20 November 2011 Senate of Spain election results in Menorca
Candidates	Parties and coalitions	Popular vote	
Candidates	Parties and coalitions	Votes	%
Juana Francisca Pons Vila	PP	17,224	46.97
• Elena Baquero González	PSOE	10,607	28.93
• Antonio Jesús Carrillos Cantó	EUIB	2,099	5.72
• Joan Carles Villalonga Sintes	PSM–EN	1,733	4.73
• Rafael Muñoz Campos	eQuo	883	2.41
• Pablo Sebastián Sánchez Arnoletto	UPyD	742	2.02
• Guillermo Alonso de Armiño Erce	Hartos.org	633	1.73
Blank ballots		2,746	7.49
Total		36,667	
Valid votes		36,667	93.47
Invalid votes		2,561	6.53
Votes cast / turnout		39,228	59.57
Abstentions		26,623	40.43
Registered voters		65,851	

=== 2008 ===
Summary of the 9 March 2008 Senate of Spain election results in Menorca
Candidates	Parties and coalitions	Popular vote	
Candidates	Parties and coalitions	Votes	%
Arturo Bagur Mercadal	PSOE–EU–PSM–Verds	21,023	52.04
• José Seguí Díaz	PP	16,123	39.91
• Buenaventura Quevedo Roca "Tim"	CMe–C's	577	1.43
• Antonia Ordinas Coll	LV–GV	469	1.16
• Juan Moragues Riutort	PFyV	287	0.71
• Ambrosio Duque Carretero	PCPE	232	0.57
• María Consuelo de la Vega Sestelo	PACMA	220	0.54
• Carlos Granado Rincón	UPyD	194	0.48
• Eduardo Romero Maté	PUM+J	77	0.19
• Rubén Antonio Barranco Medina	DN	44	0.11
• Antonio Morell Pons	FE–JONS	27	0.07
• Paula Estades Castell	TD	13	0.03
• José Antonio de Imaña Barron	AES	6	0.01
• Jesús José Blasco Lagunilla	CTC	3	0.01
Blank ballots		1,104	2.73
Total		40,399	
Valid votes		40,399	96.48
Invalid votes		1,474	3.52
Votes cast / turnout		41,873	65.61
Abstentions		21,950	34.39
Registered voters		63,823	

=== 2004 ===
Summary of the 14 March 2004 Senate of Spain election results in Menorca
Candidates	Parties and coalitions	Popular vote	
Candidates	Parties and coalitions	Votes	%
José Seguí Díaz	PP	17,053	41.85
• Antoni Orell Calafat	PSOE	15,100	37.06
• Joan Manel Martí Llufriu	PSM–EN	4,242	10.41
• Miguel Pons Velasco	EM–IU	2,021	4.96
• Pablo Lluch Mesquida	UCM	802	1.97
• Margarita Pons Martí	FE–JONS	181	0.44
• Joaquín González Barrero	FA	122	0.30
• Vicente Garau Juan	UPB	98	0.24
• Miguel Vallinas García	CTC	27	0.07
Blank ballots		1,099	2.70
Total		40,745	
Valid votes		40,745	97.32
Invalid votes		1,120	2.68
Votes cast / turnout		41,865	67.96
Abstentions		19,734	32.04
Registered voters		61,599	

=== 2000 ===
Summary of the 12 March 2000 Senate of Spain election results in Menorca
Candidates	Parties and coalitions	Popular vote	
Candidates	Parties and coalitions	Votes	%
José Seguí Díaz	PP–INME	16,892	50.00
• Sergi Marí Pons	PPM	14,569	43.12
• Vicente Garau Juan	UPB	580	1.72
• Juana Teresa Soria Bravo	FE	98	0.29
Blank ballots		1,646	4.87
Total		33,785	
Valid votes		33,785	97.66
Invalid votes		810	2.34
Votes cast / turnout		34,595	61.13
Abstentions		21,994	38.87
Registered voters		56,589	

=== 1996 ===
Summary of the 3 March 1996 Senate of Spain election results in Menorca
Candidates	Parties and coalitions	Popular vote	
Candidates	Parties and coalitions	Votes	%
Bernardo Llompart Díaz	PP	15,675	43.51
• Tirso Pons Pons	PSOE	12,673	35.17
• Josep María Foguet Coll	IU	3,470	9.63
• Joan Manel Martí Llufriu	PSM–ENE	2,395	6.65
• Pedro Román Bordera	INME	558	1.55
• Joel Bagur Mellinas	ERC	264	0.73
Blank ballots		994	2.76
Total		36,029	
Valid votes		36,029	97.12
Invalid votes		1,070	2.88
Votes cast / turnout		37,099	69.81
Abstentions		16,046	30.19
Registered voters		53,145	

=== 1993 ===
Summary of the 6 June 1993 Senate of Spain election results in Menorca
Candidates	Parties and coalitions	Popular vote	
Candidates	Parties and coalitions	Votes	%
Martín José Escudero Sirerol	PP	15,759	45.60
• Juana María Barceló Martí	PSOE	11,711	33.88
• Antonio Venancio Casero Rodríguez	IU	2,803	8.11
• Gabriel Martí Barber	CDS	1,488	4.31
• María Juan Benejam	PSM–ENE	1,410	4.08
• Llorenç Lluís Carreras i Murillo	ERC	270	0.78
• José Francisco Xabuch Fortuny	UMMP	205	0.59
• Antonio Colom Covas	CNPS	29	0.08
• Cosme García Torres	PRB	29	0.08
Blank ballots		858	2.48
Total		34,562	
Valid votes		34,562	97.01
Invalid votes		1,067	2.99
Votes cast / turnout		35,629	70.19
Abstentions		15,130	29.81
Registered voters		50,759	

=== 1989 ===
Summary of the 29 October 1989 Senate of Spain election results in Menorca
Candidates	Parties and coalitions	Popular vote	
Candidates	Parties and coalitions	Votes	%
Martín José Escudero Sirerol	PP	11,625	38.67
• Tirso Pons Pons	PSOE	10,355	34.45
• Antonio Anglada Anglada	CDS	2,635	8.77
• Antonio Casero Rodríguez	IU	2,558	8.51
• María Juan Benejam	PSM–ENE	1,629	5.42
• Carlos Morillo Casals	Ruiz-Mateos	374	1.24
• Manuel Muñoz Díaz-Maroto	PTE–UC	88	0.29
• Ramón Enric Carreras Torrent	CEES	75	0.25
• Eusebio Capel Rotger	MCE	34	0.11
• Julián Candel Mataix	PRB	30	0.10
Blank ballots		656	2.18
Total		30,059	
Valid votes		30,059	95.55
Invalid votes		1,400	4.45
Votes cast / turnout		31,459	64.40
Abstentions		17,391	35.60
Registered voters		48,850	

=== 1986 ===
Summary of the 22 June 1986 Senate of Spain election results in Menorca
Candidates	Parties and coalitions	Popular vote	
Candidates	Parties and coalitions	Votes	%
Antonio Villalonga Riudavets	PSOE	11,268	39.67
• Juan Huguet Rotger	AP–PDP–PL	9,647	33.96
• Joan López Casasnovas	EEM	3,687	12.98
• Cristóbal Triay Humbert	PRD	1,543	5.43
• Carlos Ricci Fabre	CDS	1,425	5.02
• Mauricio Sante Patón	MUC	156	0.55
Blank ballots		677	2.38
Total		28,403	
Valid votes		28,403	94.75
Invalid votes		1,575	5.25
Votes cast / turnout		29,978	66.04
Abstentions		15,416	33.96
Registered voters		45,394	

=== 1982 ===
Summary of the 28 October 1982 Senate of Spain election results in Menorca
Candidates	Parties and coalitions	Popular vote	
Candidates	Parties and coalitions	Votes	%
Antonio Villalonga Riudavets	PSOE	12,080	
• Victoria Florit Escrivá	AP–PDP	8,194	
• Josep María Quintana Petrus	CIM	4,259	
• Antonio Casasnovas Franco	UCD	3,655	
• Juli Mascaró Pons	PSM	1,977	
• Sofía Sintes Rosa	PCE	498	
• Octavio Juan Benejam	CDS	0	
• Sebastián Barceló Barceló	FE–JONS	0	
Blank ballots			
Total			
Valid votes			
Invalid votes			
Votes cast / turnout			
Abstentions			
Registered voters		40,213	

=== 1979 ===
Summary of the 1 March 1979 Senate of Spain election results in Menorca
Candidates	Parties and coalitions	Popular vote	
Candidates	Parties and coalitions	Votes	%
Tirso Pons Pons	CPM	11,745	43.90
• Francisco Tutzo Bennasar	UCD	11,553	43.19
• José Allés y Serra	CD	3,217	12.03
Blank ballots		237	0.89
Total		26,752	
Valid votes		26,752	93.73
Invalid votes		1,791	6.27
Votes cast / turnout		28,543	74.17
Abstentions		9,939	25.83
Registered voters		38,482	

=== 1977 ===
Summary of the 15 June 1977 Senate of Spain election results in Menorca
Parties and alliances	Popular vote			Seats	
Parties and alliances	Votes	%	±pp	Total	+/−
Union of the Democratic Centre (UCD)	9,248	32.42	n/a	1	n/a
Independent Democratic Candidacy (CDI)	9,104	31.92	n/a	0	n/a
People's Alliance (AP)	4,355	15.27	n/a	0	n/a
Spanish Socialist Workers' Party (PSOE)	3,201	11.22	n/a	0	n/a
Menorca Island and Regional Problems (MPIA)	1,354	4.75	n/a	0	n/a
Democratic Union of the Balearic Islands (UDIB)	666	2.34	n/a	0	n/a
Spanish Socialist Workers' Party (historical) (PSOEh)	594	2.08	n/a	0	n/a
Blank ballots			n/a		
Total	28,522			1	n/a
Valid votes			n/a		
Invalid votes			n/a		
Votes cast / turnout			n/a		
Abstentions			n/a		
Registered voters	34,971				

== Bibliography ==
- Ley 1/1977, de 4 de enero, para la Reforma Política (Fundamental Law 1/1977). Official State Gazette (in Spanish). 4 January 1977. BOE-A-1977-165.
- Real Decreto-ley 20/1977, de 18 de marzo, sobre Normas Electorales (Royal Decree-Law 20/1977). Official State Gazette (in Spanish). 18 March 1977. BOE-A-1977-7445.
- Constitución Española (Constitution). Official State Gazette (in Spanish). 27 December 1978. BOE-A-1978-31229.
- Ley Orgánica 5/1985, de 19 de junio, del Régimen Electoral General (Organic Law 5/1985). Official State Gazette (in Spanish). 19 June 1985. BOE-A-1985-11672.
- Carreras de Odriozola, Albert; Tafunell Sambola, Xavier (2005) [1989]. Estadísticas históricas de España, siglos XIX-XX (PDF) (in Spanish). Vol. 1 (II ed.). Bilbao: Fundación BBVA. pp. 1072–1097. ISBN 84-96515-00-1. Archived from the original (PDF) on 24 September 2015.
