= Results of the 2016 Spanish Congress election =

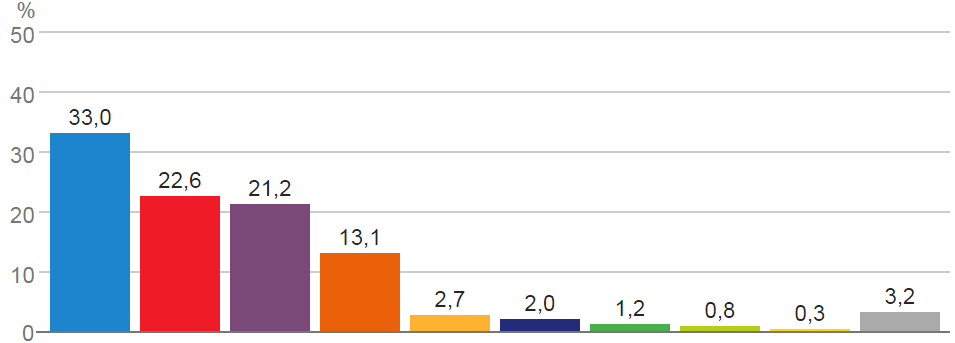
(Spain)	Main: 2016 Spanish general election
← 2015 26 June 2016 2019 (Apr) →
Party		Votes	%	Seats
	PP	7,941,236	33.0%	137
	PSOE	5,443,846	22.6%	85
	Unidos Podemos	5,087,538	21.2%	71
	C's	3,141,570	13.1%	32
	ERC–CatSí	639,652	2.7%	9
	CDC	483,488	2.0%	8
	EAJ/PNV	287,014	1.2%	5
	EH Bildu	184,713	0.8%	2
	CCa–PNC	81,917	0.3%	1
	Others	762,781	3.2%	0
Total		24,053,755	100.0%	350

This article presents the results breakdown of the election to the Congress of Deputies held in Spain on 26 June 2016. The following tables show detailed results in each of the country's 17 autonomous communities and in the autonomous cities of Ceuta and Melilla, as well as a summary of constituency and regional results.

== Nationwide ==
← Summary of the 26 June 2016 Congress of Deputies election results →
Parties and alliances	Popular vote			Seats	
Parties and alliances	Votes	%	±pp	Total	+/−
People's Party (PP)	7,941,236	33.01	+4.30	137	+14
Spanish Socialist Workers' Party (PSOE)	5,443,846	22.63	+0.63	85	−5
United We Can (Unidos Podemos)	5,087,538	21.15	−3.34	71	±0
United We Can (Podemos–IU–Equo)^{1}	3,227,123	13.42	−2.63	45	+1
In Common We Can–Let's Win the Change (ECP)	853,102	3.55	−0.14	12	±0
The Valencian Way (Podemos–Compromís–EUPV)^{2}	659,771	2.74	−0.38	9	±0
In Tide (Podemos–Anova–EU)	347,542	1.44	−0.19	5	−1
Citizens–Party of the Citizenry (C's)	3,141,570	13.06	−0.88	32	−8
Republican Left–Catalonia Yes (ERC–CatSí)	639,652	2.66	+0.26	9	±0
Republican Left–Catalonia Yes (ERC–CatSí)	632,234	2.63	+0.24	9	±0
Sovereignty for the Isles (SI)	7,418	0.03	New	0	±0
Democratic Convergence of Catalonia (CDC)^{3}	483,488	2.01	−0.24	8	±0
Basque Nationalist Party (EAJ/PNV)	287,014	1.19	−0.01	5	−1
Animalist Party Against Mistreatment of Animals (PACMA)	286,702	1.19	+0.32	0	±0
Basque Country Gather (EH Bildu)	184,713	0.77	−0.10	2	±0
Canarian Coalition–Canarian Nationalist Party (CCa–PNC)	78,253	0.33	+0.01	1	±0
Zero Cuts–Green Group (Recortes Cero–GV)	51,907	0.22	+0.03	0	±0
Union, Progress and Democracy (UPyD)	50,247	0.21	−0.41	0	±0
Vox (Vox)	47,182	0.20	−0.03	0	±0
Galician Nationalist Bloc–We–Galician Candidacy (BNG–Nós)^{4}	45,252	0.19	−0.09	0	±0
Communist Party of the Peoples of Spain (PCPE)	26,627	0.11	−0.01	0	±0
Yes to the Future (GBai)	14,343	0.06	−0.06	0	±0
Blank Seats (EB)	11,669	0.05	+0.01	0	±0
Spanish Phalanx of the CNSO (FE de las JONS)	9,909	0.04	+0.01	0	±0
Citizens of Democratic Centre (CCD)	8,945	0.04	±0.00	0	±0
Citizens of Democratic Centre (CCD)	6,273	0.03	−0.01	0	±0
Citizens of Democratic Centre–Independent Candidacy (CCD–CI)	2,672	0.01	New	0	±0
We Are Valencian (SOMVAL)	6,647	0.03	+0.01	0	±0
Internationalist Solidarity and Self-Management (SAIn)	3,110	0.01	−0.01	0	±0
Humanist Party (PH)	3,012	0.01	±0.00	0	±0
The Eco-pacifist Greens (Centro Moderado)	3,011	0.01	±0.00	0	±0
Libertarian Party (P–LIB)	2,996	0.01	±0.00	0	±0
Leonese People's Union (UPL)	2,295	0.01	New	0	±0
Spanish Communist Workers' Party (PCOE)	1,822	0.01	±0.00	0	±0
We Are Andalusians Party, For Andalusia and the Peoples (AND)	1,727	0.01	New	0	±0
Together for Canaries (JxC)	1,190	0.00	New	0	±0
Family and Life Party (PFyV)	846	0.00	±0.00	0	±0
United Free Citizens (CILUS)	830	0.00	±0.00	0	±0
Platform for Catalonia (PxC)	724	0.00	New	0	±0
Social Aragonese Movement (MAS)	723	0.00	New	0	±0
Navarrese Freedom (Ln)	702	0.00	±0.00	0	±0
Navarrese Freedom (Ln)	622	0.00	±0.00	0	±0
Rioja Southern Territory–Navarrese Freedom (HRTS–Ln)	80	0.00	New	0	±0
Revolutionary Anticapitalist Left (IZAR)	687	0.00	New	0	±0
Unity of the People (UP)^{5}	686	0.00	−0.01	0	±0
Regionalist Party of the Leonese Country (PREPAL)	668	0.00	−0.01	0	±0
Political Renovation (RePo)	570	0.00	New	0	±0
Independents for Aragon (i)	550	0.00	±0.00	0	±0
Forward (Entabán)	377	0.00	New	0	±0
Merindades of Castile Initiative (IMC)	356	0.00	New	0	±0
State of Spain Unionist Party (PUEDE)	336	0.00	New	0	±0
The Phalanx (FE)	254	0.00	New	0	±0
Alliance of the Democratic Centre (ALCD)	214	0.00	New	0	±0
Spain Elders' Force (FME)	200	0.00	New	0	±0
Union of Everyone (UdT)	48	0.00	New	0	±0
Blank ballots	179,081	0.74	−0.01		
Total	24,053,755			350	±0
Valid votes	24,053,755	99.07	−0.04		
Invalid votes	225,504	0.93	+0.04		
Votes cast / turnout	24,279,259	66.48	−3.19		
Abstentions	12,241,654	33.52	+3.19		
Registered voters	36,520,913				
Sources
Footnotes: ^{1} United We Can results are compared to the combined totals of We Can, United Left–Popular Unity in Common and More for the Balearic Islands in the 2015 election. It does not include results in Catalonia, Galicia and Valencian Community.; ^{2} The Valencian Way results are compared to the combined totals of It is Time and United Left of the Valencian Country in the 2015 election.; ^{3} Democratic Convergence of Catalonia results are compared to Democracy and Freedom totals in the 2015 election.; ^{4} Galician Nationalist Bloc–We–Galician Candidacy results are compared to We–Galician Candidacy totals in the 2015 election.; ^{5} Unity of the People results are compared to Canaries Decides totals in the 2015 election.

== Summary ==
=== Constituencies ===

Summary of constituency results in the 26 June 2016 Congress of Deputies election
Constituency	PP		PSOE		UP		C's		ERC		CDC		PNV		EH Bildu		CC–PNC	
Constituency	%	S	%	S	%	S	%	S	%	S	%	S	%	S	%	S	%	S
A Coruña	40.1	4	21.8	2	23.1	2	9.4	−										
Álava	20.4	1	15.7	1	30.9	1	5.0	−					15.9	1	9.5	−		
Albacete	40.9	2	27.2	1	15.3	1	14.6	−										
Alicante	37.7	5	21.4	2	22.1	3	15.8	2										
Almería	43.0	3	27.7	2	13.2	−	13.7	1										
Asturias	35.3	3	24.9	2	23.9	2	12.6	1										
Ávila	51.5	2	19.5	1	12.7	−	14.3	−										
Badajoz	39.6	3	35.3	2	12.5	1	10.7	−										
Balearic Islands	35.1	3	20.1	2	25.4	2	14.6	1	1.6	−								
Barcelona	13.5	4	16.8	5	26.3	9	11.5	4	16.6	5	12.2	4						
Biscay	12.7	1	13.9	1	28.9	3	3.3	−					28.2	2	10.9	1		
Burgos	42.9	2	22.1	1	17.3	1	14.7	−										
Cáceres	40.4	2	33.3	2	14.0	−	10.3	−										
Cádiz	32.3	3	28.5	3	21.2	2	14.3	1										
Cantabria	41.5	2	23.5	1	17.7	1	14.4	1										
Castellón	35.7	2	22.1	1	24.2	1	14.7	1										
Ceuta	51.9	1	22.6	–	10.8	–	11.5	–										
Ciudad Real	43.5	3	29.3	2	13.4	–	11.9	–										
Córdoba	34.4	2	31.2	2	19.0	1	12.4	1										
Cuenca	45.8	2	29.7	1	13.2	–	9.4	–										
Gipuzkoa	9.7	–	14.1	1	28.6	2	3.2	–					23.3	2	19.1	1		
Girona	10.1	–	12.5	1	17.3	1	7.7	–	26.3	2	23.2	2						
Granada	35.3	3	30.9	2	17.8	1	13.5	1										
Guadalajara	39.6	2	23.0	1	18.2	–	16.4	–										
Huelva	33.3	2	35.8	2	16.3	1	11.7	–										
Huesca	36.2	1	25.6	1	19.2	1	15.3	–										
Jaén	35.4	2	37.4	2	14.4	1	10.5	–										
La Rioja	42.6	2	24.3	1	16.6	1	14.0	–										
Las Palmas	33.9	3	23.8	2	22.5	2	13.0	1									3.6	–
León	40.1	2	26.2	1	17.6	1	12.8	–										
Lleida	13.5	1	12.4	–	16.7	1	7.0	–	25.1	1	22.6	1						
Lugo	47.4	2	23.7	1	17.0	1	6.9	–										
Madrid	38.2	15	19.6	7	21.3	8	17.8	6										
Málaga	34.4	4	27.0	3	18.9	2	16.3	2										
Melilla	49.9	1	25.1	–	9.8	–	12.4	–										
Murcia	46.7	5	20.3	2	14.5	1	15.7	2										
Navarre	31.9	2	17.3	1	28.3	2	6.1	–							9.4	–		
Ourense	49.7	3	23.3	1	15.6	–	7.1	–										
Palencia	45.7	2	24.6	1	15.0	–	12.4	–										
Pontevedra	38.4	3	21.8	2	25.2	2	8.9	–										
Salamanca	48.2	3	21.4	1	12.6	–	15.7	–										
Santa Cruz de Tenerife	34.2	3	21.2	1	17.9	1	11.0	1									12.6	1
Segovia	45.4	2	21.5	1	15.2	–	15.4	–										
Seville	29.0	4	33.6	4	20.8	3	13.4	1										
Soria	44.9	1	25.7	1	15.3	–	11.4	–										
Tarragona	14.9	1	15.7	1	21.9	1	11.3	1	19.7	1	13.7	1						
Teruel	41.3	2	26.3	1	16.8	–	13.2	–										
Toledo	43.4	3	26.6	2	14.7	1	13.0	–										
Valencia	34.0	6	20.1	3	27.8	5	14.5	2										
Valladolid	41.8	2	22.7	1	16.4	1	15.6	1										
Zamora	48.3	2	23.9	1	14.1	–	11.4	–										
Zaragoza	34.9	3	24.4	2	20.3	1	16.8	1										
Total	33.0	137	22.6	85	21.2	71	13.1	32	2.7	9	2.0	8	1.2	5	0.8	2	0.3	1

=== Regions ===

Summary of regional results in the 26 June 2016 Congress of Deputies election
Region	PP		PSOE		UP		C's		ERC		CDC		PNV		EH Bildu		CC–PNC	
Region	%	S	%	S	%	S	%	S	%	S	%	S	%	S	%	S	%	S
Andalusia	33.5	23	31.2	20	18.6	11	13.6	7										
Aragon	35.8	6	24.8	4	19.7	2	16.2	1										
Asturias	35.3	3	24.9	2	23.9	2	12.6	1										
Balearic Islands	35.1	3	20.1	2	25.4	2	14.6	1	1.6	−								
Basque Country	12.9	2	14.2	3	29.1	6	3.5	−					24.9	5	13.3	2		
Canary Islands	34.1	6	22.5	3	20.3	3	12.0	2									8.0	1
Cantabria	41.5	2	23.5	1	17.7	1	14.4	1										
Castile and León	44.3	18	23.1	9	15.6	3	14.2	1										
Castilla–La Mancha	42.7	12	27.3	7	14.7	2	13.0	−										
Catalonia	13.4	6	16.1	7	24.5	12	10.9	5	18.2	9	13.9	8						
Ceuta	51.9	1	22.6	–	10.8	–	11.5	–										
Extremadura	39.9	5	34.5	4	13.1	1	10.5	−										
Galicia	41.5	12	22.2	6	22.2	5	8.6	−										
La Rioja	42.6	2	24.3	1	16.6	1	14.0	–										
Madrid	38.2	15	19.6	7	21.3	8	17.8	6										
Melilla	49.9	1	25.1	–	9.8	–	12.4	–										
Murcia	46.7	5	20.3	2	14.5	1	15.7	2										
Navarre	31.9	2	17.3	1	28.3	2	6.1	–							9.4	–		
Valencian Community	35.4	13	20.8	6	25.4	9	15.0	5										
Total	33.0	137	22.6	85	21.2	71	13.1	32	2.6	9	2.0	8	1.2	5	0.8	2	0.3	1

== Autonomous communities ==
=== Andalusia ===
← Summary of the 26 June 2016 Congress of Deputies election results in Andalusia →
Parties and alliances	Popular vote			Seats	
Parties and alliances	Votes	%	±pp	Total	+/−
People's Party (PP)	1,426,258	33.53	+4.45	23	+2
Spanish Socialist Workers' Party (PSOE)	1,326,838	31.20	−0.30	20	−2
United We Can for Andalusia (Podemos–IU–Equo)^{1}	792,008	18.62	−4.05	11	+1
Citizens–Party of the Citizenry (C's)	578,123	13.59	−0.19	7	−1
Animalist Party Against Mistreatment of Animals (PACMA)	52,870	1.24	+0.32	0	±0
Union, Progress and Democracy (UPyD)	9,932	0.23	−0.29	0	±0
Vox (Vox)	8,341	0.20	±0.00	0	±0
Zero Cuts–Green Group (Recortes Cero–GV)	7,317	0.17	+0.04	0	±0
Communist Party of the Peoples of Spain (PCPE)	5,482	0.13	+0.01	0	±0
Spanish Phalanx of the CNSO (FE de las JONS)	1,980	0.05	+0.01	0	±0
We Are Andalusians Party, For Andalusia and the Peoples (AND)	1,727	0.04	New	0	±0
Spanish Communist Workers' Party (PCOE)	1,696	0.04	±0.00	0	±0
Blank Seats (EB)	961	0.02	+0.01	0	±0
United Free Citizens (CILUS)	830	0.02	−0.01	0	±0
Revolutionary Anticapitalist Left (IZAR)	687	0.02	New	0	±0
Libertarian Party (P–LIB)	393	0.01	−0.02	0	±0
Blank ballots	37,895	0.89	+0.04		
Total	4,253,338			61	±0
Valid votes	4,253,338	98.94	−0.12		
Invalid votes	45,400	1.06	+0.12		
Votes cast / turnout	4,298,738	66.05	−3.03		
Abstentions	2,210,001	33.95	+3.03		
Registered voters	6,508,739				
Sources
Footnotes: ^{1} United We Can results are compared to the combined totals of We Can and United Left/Greens–Assembly for Andalusia–Popular Unity in Common in the 2015 election.

=== Aragon ===
← Summary of the 26 June 2016 Congress of Deputies election results in Aragon →
Parties and alliances	Popular vote			Seats	
Parties and alliances	Votes	%	±pp	Total	+/−
People's Party–Aragonese Party (PP–PAR)	252,456	35.81	+4.50	6	±0
Spanish Socialist Workers' Party (PSOE)	174,960	24.82	+1.77	4	±0
United We Can in Aragon (Podemos–IU–Equo)^{1}	139,187	19.74	−5.02	2	±0
Citizens–Party of the Citizenry (C's)	114,239	16.21	−1.01	1	±0
Animalist Party Against Mistreatment of Animals (PACMA)	6,336	0.90	+0.19	0	±0
Blank Seats (EB)	3,764	0.53	+0.01	0	±0
Vox (Vox)	2,013	0.29	+0.04	0	±0
Union, Progress and Democracy (UPyD)	1,634	0.23	−0.56	0	±0
Zero Cuts–Green Group (Recortes Cero–GV)	1,478	0.21	+0.01	0	±0
Communist Party of the Peoples of Spain (PCPE)	984	0.14	−0.02	0	±0
Social Aragonese Movement (MAS)	723	0.10	New	0	±0
Independents for Aragon (i)	550	0.08	−0.01	0	±0
Forward (Entabán)	377	0.05	New	0	±0
Spanish Phalanx of the CNSO (FE de las JONS)	160	0.02	New	0	±0
Union of Everyone (UdT)	48	0.01	New	0	±0
Blank ballots	6,032	0.86	−0.07		
Total	704,941			13	±0
Valid votes	704,941	99.13	−0.04		
Invalid votes	6,153	0.87	+0.04		
Votes cast / turnout	711,094	69.92	−2.66		
Abstentions	305,896	30.08	+2.66		
Registered voters	1,016,990				
Sources
Footnotes: ^{1} United We Can results are compared to the combined totals of We Can and United Left–Aragonese Union–Popular Unity in Common in the 2015 election.

=== Asturias ===
← Summary of the 26 June 2016 Congress of Deputies election results in Asturias →
Parties and alliances	Popular vote			Seats	
Parties and alliances	Votes	%	±pp	Total	+/−
People's Party–Forum (PP–Foro)	209,632	35.25	+5.14	3	±0
Spanish Socialist Workers' Party (PSOE)	147,920	24.87	+1.58	2	±0
United We Can (Podemos–IU–Equo–IAS–CLI–AS)^{1}	141,845	23.85	−5.94	2	±0
Citizens–Party of the Citizenry (C's)	74,961	12.60	−0.96	1	±0
Animalist Party Against Mistreatment of Animals (PACMA)	6,398	1.08	+0.35	0	±0
Blank Seats (EB)	2,517	0.42	+0.12	0	±0
Vox (Vox)	1,442	0.24	−0.04	0	±0
Union, Progress and Democracy (UPyD)	1,391	0.23	−0.39	0	±0
Communist Party of the Peoples of Spain (PCPE)	1,383	0.23	+0.03	0	±0
Zero Cuts–Green Group (Recortes Cero–GV)	1,086	0.18	+0.01	0	±0
Humanist Party (PH)	414	0.07	+0.01	0	±0
State of Spain Unionist Party (PUEDE)	336	0.06	New	0	±0
Blank ballots	5,374	0.90	±0.00		
Total	594,699			8	±0
Valid votes	594,699	99.04	−0.13		
Invalid votes	5,764	0.96	+0.13		
Votes cast / turnout	600,463	61.09	−2.68		
Abstentions	382,374	38.91	+2.68		
Registered voters	982,837				
Sources
Footnotes: ^{1} United We Can results are compared to the combined totals of We Can and United Left–Popular Unity in Common–Asturian Left in the 2015 election.

=== Balearic Islands ===
← Summary of the 26 June 2016 Congress of Deputies election results in the Balearic Islands →
Parties and alliances	Popular vote			Seats	
Parties and alliances	Votes	%	±pp	Total	+/−
People's Party (PP)	163,045	35.08	+6.02	3	±0
United We Can–More (Podemos–EUIB–Més)^{1}	118,082	25.41	−7.03	2	±0
Spanish Socialist Workers' Party (PSOE)	93,363	20.09	+1.78	2	±0
Citizens–Party of the Citizenry (C's)	67,700	14.57	−0.21	1	±0
Sovereignty for the Isles (SI)	7,418	1.60	New	0	±0
Animalist Party Against Mistreatment of Animals (PACMA)	7,266	1.56	+0.50	0	±0
Zero Cuts–Green Group (Recortes Cero–GV)	1,644	0.35	+0.11	0	±0
Union, Progress and Democracy (UPyD)	1,197	0.26	−0.21	0	±0
Family and Life Party (PFyV)	846	0.18	+0.03	0	±0
Blank ballots	4,226	0.91	+0.08		
Total	464,787			8	±0
Valid votes	464,787	99.01	−0.03		
Invalid votes	4,650	0.99	+0.03		
Votes cast / turnout	469,437	60.73	−2.62		
Abstentions	303,502	39.27	+2.62		
Registered voters	772,939				
Sources
Footnotes: ^{1} United We Can–More results are compared to the combined totals of We Can, More for the Balearic Islands and United Left–Balearic Popular Unity in the 2015 election.

=== Basque Country ===
← Summary of the 26 June 2016 Congress of Deputies election results in the Basque Country →
Parties and alliances	Popular vote			Seats	
Parties and alliances	Votes	%	±pp	Total	+/−
United We Can (Podemos/Ahal Dugu–IU–Equo)^{1}	335,740	29.08	+0.16	6	+1
Basque Nationalist Party (EAJ/PNV)	287,014	24.86	+0.14	5	−1
Socialist Party of the Basque Country–Basque Country Left (PSE–EE (PSOE))	164,255	14.23	+0.98	3	±0
Basque Country Gather (EH Bildu)	153,339	13.28	−1.78	2	±0
People's Party (PP)	148,553	12.87	+1.25	2	±0
Citizens–Party of the Citizenry (C's)	40,740	3.53	−0.58	0	±0
Animalist Party Against Mistreatment of Animals (PACMA)	9,310	0.81	+0.16	0	±0
Zero Cuts–Green Group (Recortes Cero–GV)	2,947	0.26	+0.06	0	±0
Union, Progress and Democracy (UPyD)	1,542	0.13	−0.20	0	±0
Blank Seats (EB/AZ)	1,026	0.09	−0.03	0	±0
Communist Party of the Peoples of Spain (PCPE)	962	0.08	+0.03	0	±0
Vox (Vox)	947	0.08	New	0	±0
Libertarian Party (P–LIB)	207	0.02	New	0	±0
Navarrese Freedom (Ln)	74	0.01	−0.03	0	±0
Blank ballots	7,696	0.67	−0.04		
Total	1,154,352			18	±0
Valid votes	1,154,352	99.32	+0.01		
Invalid votes	7,887	0.68	−0.01		
Votes cast / turnout	1,162,239	65.17	−3.83		
Abstentions	621,126	34.83	+3.83		
Registered voters	1,783,365				
Sources
Footnotes: ^{1} United We Can results are compared to the combined totals of We Can and United Left–Popular Unity in Common in the 2015 election.

=== Canary Islands ===
← Summary of the 26 June 2016 Congress of Deputies election results in the Canary Islands →
Parties and alliances	Popular vote			Seats	
Parties and alliances	Votes	%	±pp	Total	+/−
People's Party (PP)	333,445	34.05	+5.52	6	+1
Spanish Socialist Workers' Party–New Canaries (PSOE–NCa)	220,471	22.52	+0.55	3	−1
United We Can (Podemos–IU–Equo)^{1}	198,434	20.27	−6.14	3	±0
Citizens–Party of the Citizenry (C's)	117,748	12.03	+0.60	2	±0
Canarian Coalition–Canarian Nationalist Party (CCa–PNC)	78,253	7.99	−0.25	1	±0
Animalist Party Against Mistreatment of Animals (PACMA)	14,973	1.53	+0.33	0	±0
Zero Cuts–Green Group (Recortes Cero–GV)	2,969	0.30	+0.03	0	±0
Communist Party of the Canarian People (PCPC)	1,549	0.16	−0.01	0	±0
Together for Canaries (JxC)	1,190	0.12	New	0	±0
Union, Progress and Democracy (UPyD)	978	0.10	−0.37	0	±0
Vox (Vox)	882	0.09	−0.07	0	±0
Unity of the People (UP)^{2}	686	0.07	−0.22	0	±0
Blank Seats (EB)	647	0.07	New	0	±0
Humanist Party (PH)	450	0.05	+0.01	0	±0
Internationalist Solidarity and Self-Management (SAIn)	212	0.02	−0.01	0	±0
Blank ballots	6,285	0.64	−0.09		
Total	979,172			15	±0
Valid votes	979,172	98.82	+0.10		
Invalid votes	11,710	1.18	−0.10		
Votes cast / turnout	990,882	59.11	−1.22		
Abstentions	685,407	40.89	+1.22		
Registered voters	1,676,289				
Sources
Footnotes: ^{1} United We Can results are compared to the combined totals of We Can and Canarian United Left–Popular Unity in Common in the 2015 election.; ^{2} Unity of the People results are compared to Canaries Decides totals in the 2015 election.

=== Cantabria ===
← Summary of the 26 June 2016 Congress of Deputies election results in Cantabria →
Parties and alliances	Popular vote			Seats	
Parties and alliances	Votes	%	±pp	Total	+/−
People's Party (PP)	140,252	41.55	+4.64	2	±0
Spanish Socialist Workers' Party (PSOE)	79,407	23.52	+1.11	1	±0
United We Can (Podemos–IU–Equo)^{1}	59,845	17.73	−4.56	1	±0
Citizens–Party of the Citizenry (C's)	48,626	14.40	−0.85	1	±0
Animalist Party Against Mistreatment of Animals (PACMA)	3,369	1.00	+0.16	0	±0
Union, Progress and Democracy (UPyD)	1,051	0.31	−0.51	0	±0
Vox (Vox)	713	0.21	−0.05	0	±0
Blank Seats (EB)	596	0.18	New	0	±0
Zero Cuts–Green Group (Recortes Cero–GV)	483	0.14	−0.01	0	±0
Communist Party of the Peoples of Spain (PCPE)	468	0.14	+0.01	0	±0
Internationalist Solidarity and Self-Management (SAIn)	156	0.05	±0.00	0	±0
Libertarian Party (P–LIB)	147	0.04	New	0	±0
Blank ballots	2,454	0.73	−0.08		
Total	337,567			5	±0
Valid votes	337,567	98.89	−0.01		
Invalid votes	3,781	1.11	+0.01		
Votes cast / turnout	341,348	68.52	−2.45		
Abstentions	156,855	31.48	+2.45		
Registered voters	498,203				
Sources
Footnotes: ^{1} United We Can results are compared to the combined totals of We Can and United Left–Popular Unity in Common in the 2015 election.

=== Castile and León ===
← Summary of the 26 June 2016 Congress of Deputies election results in Castile and León →
Parties and alliances	Popular vote			Seats	
Parties and alliances	Votes	%	±pp	Total	+/−
People's Party (PP)	643,093	44.27	+5.17	18	+1
Spanish Socialist Workers' Party (PSOE)	336,286	23.15	+0.68	9	±0
United We Can (Podemos–IU–Equo)^{1}	226,313	15.58	−4.05	3	±0
Citizens–Party of the Citizenry (C's)	205,613	14.15	−1.21	1	−2
Animalist Party Against Mistreatment of Animals (PACMA)	10,330	0.71	+0.14	0	±0
Union, Progress and Democracy (UPyD)	4,520	0.31	−0.56	0	±0
Vox (Vox)	2,741	0.19	−0.08	0	±0
Citizens of Democratic Centre–Independent Candidacy (CCD–CI)	2,672	0.18	+0.08	0	±0
Zero Cuts–Green Group (Recortes Cero–GV)	2,545	0.18	+0.01	0	±0
Leonese People's Union (UPL)	2,295	0.16	New	0	±0
Communist Party of the Peoples of Spain (PCPE)	1,575	0.11	−0.04	0	±0
Spanish Phalanx of the CNSO (FE de las JONS)	1,091	0.08	+0.01	0	±0
Regionalist Party of the Leonese Country (PREPAL)	668	0.05	−0.04	0	±0
Internationalist Solidarity and Self-Management (SAIn)	545	0.04	−0.02	0	±0
Merindades of Castile Initiative (IMC)	356	0.02	New	0	±0
Alliance of the Democratic Centre (ALCD)	214	0.01	New	0	±0
Libertarian Party (P–LIB)	146	0.01	New	0	±0
Blank ballots	11,666	0.80	−0.14		
Total	1,452,669			31	−1
Valid votes	1,452,669	98.85	−0.05		
Invalid votes	16,830	1.15	+0.05		
Votes cast / turnout	1,469,499	68.79	−2.43		
Abstentions	666,619	31.21	+2.43		
Registered voters	2,136,118				
Sources
Footnotes: ^{1} United We Can results are compared to the combined totals of We Can and United Left–Popular Unity in Common in the 2015 election.

=== Castilla–La Mancha ===
← Summary of the 26 June 2016 Congress of Deputies election results in Castilla–La Mancha →
Parties and alliances	Popular vote			Seats	
Parties and alliances	Votes	%	±pp	Total	+/−
People's Party (PP)	475,911	42.73	+4.59	12	+2
Spanish Socialist Workers' Party (PSOE)	303,786	27.28	−1.08	7	±0
United We Can (Podemos–IU–Equo)^{1}	164,160	14.74	−2.50	2	+1
Citizens–Party of the Citizenry (C's)	145,261	13.04	−0.73	0	−3
Animalist Party Against Mistreatment of Animals (PACMA)	9,839	0.88	+0.17	0	±0
Union, Progress and Democracy (UPyD)	2,412	0.22	−0.31	0	±0
Vox (Vox)	1,828	0.16	−0.15	0	±0
Zero Cuts–Green Group (Recortes Cero–GV)	1,718	0.15	±0.00	0	±0
Spanish Phalanx of the CNSO (FE de las JONS)	791	0.07	New	0	±0
Communist Party of the Peoples of Spain (PCPE)	648	0.06	±0.00	0	±0
The Phalanx (FE)	254	0.02	New	0	±0
Spanish Communist Workers' Party (PCOE)	126	0.01	New	0	±0
Internationalist Solidarity and Self-Management (SAIn)	37	0.00	−0.01	0	±0
Blank ballots	6,988	0.63	−0.07		
Total	1,113,759			21	±0
Valid votes	1,113,759	98.89	+0.04		
Invalid votes	12,468	1.11	−0.04		
Votes cast / turnout	1,126,227	71.78	−3.48		
Abstentions	442,857	28.22	+3.48		
Registered voters	1,569,084				
Sources
Footnotes: ^{1} United We Can results are compared to the combined totals of We Can and United Left–Popular Unity in Common in the 2015 election.

=== Catalonia ===
← Summary of the 26 June 2016 Congress of Deputies election results in Catalonia →
Parties and alliances	Popular vote			Seats	
Parties and alliances	Votes	%	±pp	Total	+/−
In Common We Can–Let's Win the Change (ECP)	853,102	24.53	−0.18	12	±0
Republican Left–Catalonia Yes (ERC–CatSí)	632,234	18.18	+2.19	9	±0
Socialists' Party of Catalonia (PSC–PSOE)	559,870	16.10	+0.41	7	−1
Democratic Convergence of Catalonia (CDC)^{1}	483,488	13.90	−1.18	8	±0
People's Party (PP)	464,538	13.36	+2.24	6	+1
Citizens–Party of the Citizenry (C's)	380,497	10.94	−2.11	5	±0
Animalist Party Against Mistreatment of Animals (PACMA)	59,897	1.72	+0.55	0	±0
Zero Cuts–Green Group (Recortes Cero–GV)	9,730	0.28	−0.06	0	±0
Communist Party of the Catalan People (PCPC)	4,348	0.13	−0.06	0	±0
Platform for Catalonia (PxC)	724	0.02	New	0	±0
Vox (Vox)	198	0.01	±0.00	0	±0
Blank ballots	28,939	0.83	+0.15		
Total	3,477,565			47	±0
Valid votes	3,477,565	99.33	−0.06		
Invalid votes	23,400	0.67	+0.06		
Votes cast / turnout	3,500,965	63.42	−5.21		
Abstentions	2,018,917	36.58	+5.21		
Registered voters	5,519,882				
Sources
Footnotes: ^{1} Democratic Convergence of Catalonia results are compared to Democracy and Freedom totals in the 2015 election.

=== Extremadura ===
← Summary of the 26 June 2016 Congress of Deputies election results in Extremadura →
Parties and alliances	Popular vote			Seats	
Parties and alliances	Votes	%	±pp	Total	+/−
People's Party (PP)	245,022	39.90	+5.11	5	+1
Spanish Socialist Workers' Party (PSOE)	212,159	34.54	−1.44	4	−1
United We Can (Podemos–IU–Equo)^{1}	80,346	13.08	−2.60	1	±0
Citizens–Party of the Citizenry (C's)	64,760	10.54	−0.84	0	±0
Animalist Party Against Mistreatment of Animals (PACMA)	4,456	0.73	+0.20	0	±0
Zero Cuts–Green Group (Recortes Cero–GV)	1,073	0.17	+0.04	0	±0
Union, Progress and Democracy (UPyD)	1,054	0.17	−0.23	0	±0
Vox (Vox)	1,026	0.17	+0.09	0	±0
Blank ballots	4,258	0.69	−0.03		
Total	614,154			10	±0
Valid votes	614,154	98.63	−0.05		
Invalid votes	8,562	1.37	+0.05		
Votes cast / turnout	622,716	68.63	−3.54		
Abstentions	284,594	31.37	+3.54		
Registered voters	907,310				
Sources
Footnotes: ^{1} United We Can results are compared to the combined totals of We Can and United Left–Popular Unity in Common in the 2015 election.

=== Galicia ===
← Summary of the 26 June 2016 Congress of Deputies election results in Galicia →
Parties and alliances	Popular vote			Seats	
Parties and alliances	Votes	%	±pp	Total	+/−
People's Party (PP)	650,831	41.53	+4.41	12	+2
Socialists' Party of Galicia (PSdeG–PSOE)	348,014	22.21	+0.88	6	±0
In Tide (Podemos–Anova–EU)	347,542	22.18	−2.83	5	−1
Citizens–Party of the Citizenry (C's)	135,125	8.62	−0.44	0	−1
Galician Nationalist Bloc–We–Galician Candidacy (BNG–Nós)^{1}	45,252	2.89	−1.43	0	±0
Animalist Party Against Mistreatment of Animals (PACMA)	16,964	1.08	+0.26	0	±0
Zero Cuts–Green Group (Recortes Cero–GV)	3,874	0.25	+0.02	0	±0
Communists of Galicia (PCPE–CdG)	1,690	0.11	−0.09	0	±0
Vox (Vox)	1,026	0.07	−0.01	0	±0
Union, Progress and Democracy (UPyD)	975	0.06	−0.45	0	±0
Blank Seats (EB)	785	0.05	New	0	±0
Internationalist Solidarity and Self-Management (SAIn)	392	0.03	±0.00	0	±0
Blank ballots	14,726	0.94	−0.12		
Total	1,567,196			23	±0
Valid votes	1,567,196	98.71	+0.07		
Invalid votes	20,465	1.29	−0.07		
Votes cast / turnout	1,587,661	58.76	−2.77		
Abstentions	1,114,074	41.24	+2.77		
Registered voters	2,701,735				
Sources
Footnotes: ^{1} Galician Nationalist Bloc–We–Galician Candidacy results are compared to We–Galician Candidacy totals in the 2015 election.

=== La Rioja ===
← Summary of the 26 June 2016 Congress of Deputies election results in La Rioja →
Parties and alliances	Popular vote			Seats	
Parties and alliances	Votes	%	±pp	Total	+/−
People's Party (PP)	73,708	42.61	+4.27	2	±0
Spanish Socialist Workers' Party (PSOE)	42,010	24.29	+0.60	1	±0
United We Can (Podemos–IU–Equo)^{1}	28,772	16.63	−3.40	1	±0
Citizens–Party of the Citizenry (C's)	24,180	13.98	−1.15	0	±0
Animalist Party Against Mistreatment of Animals (PACMA)	1,350	0.78	+0.12	0	±0
Union, Progress and Democracy (UPyD)	425	0.25	−0.52	0	±0
Vox (Vox)	366	0.21	New	0	±0
Zero Cuts–Green Group (Recortes Cero–GV)	312	0.18	−0.02	0	±0
Blank Seats (EB)	304	0.18	−0.02	0	±0
Communist Party of the Peoples of Spain (PCPE)	250	0.14	+0.01	0	±0
Rioja Southern Territory–Navarrese Freedom (HRTS–Ln)	80	0.05	New	0	±0
Blank ballots	1,225	0.71	−0.13		
Total	172,982			4	±0
Valid votes	172,982	98.90	+0.05		
Invalid votes	1,931	1.10	−0.05		
Votes cast / turnout	174,913	70.62	−1.81		
Abstentions	72,757	29.38	+1.81		
Registered voters	247,670				
Sources
Footnotes: ^{1} United We Can results are compared to the combined totals of We Can and United Left–Popular Unity in Common in the 2015 election.

=== Madrid ===
← Summary of the 26 June 2016 Congress of Deputies election results in Madrid →
Parties and alliances	Popular vote			Seats	
Parties and alliances	Votes	%	±pp	Total	+/−
People's Party (PP)	1,325,665	38.25	+4.81	15	+2
United We Can (Podemos–IU–Equo–CLI–AS)^{1}	737,885	21.29	−4.95	8	−2
Spanish Socialist Workers' Party (PSOE)	678,340	19.57	+1.73	7	+1
Citizens–Party of the Citizenry (C's)	616,503	17.79	−1.03	6	−1
Animalist Party Against Mistreatment of Animals (PACMA)	39,117	1.13	+0.35	0	±0
Vox (Vox)	16,803	0.48	−0.15	0	±0
Union, Progress and Democracy (UPyD)	14,659	0.42	−0.78	0	±0
Zero Cuts–Green Group (Recortes Cero–GV)	7,377	0.21	+0.10	0	±0
Spanish Phalanx of the CNSO (FE de las JONS)	3,946	0.11	−0.02	0	±0
Communist Party of the Peoples of Spain (PCPE)	3,110	0.09	+0.04	0	±0
Humanist Party (PH)	2,148	0.06	+0.01	0	±0
Libertarian Party (P–LIB)	1,111	0.03	±0.00	0	±0
Internationalist Solidarity and Self-Management (SAIn)	994	0.03	±0.00	0	±0
Blank ballots	18,137	0.52	±0.00		
Total	3,465,795			36	±0
Valid votes	3,465,795	99.32	−0.04		
Invalid votes	23,581	0.68	+0.04		
Votes cast / turnout	3,489,376	70.81	−3.31		
Abstentions	1,438,556	29.19	+3.31		
Registered voters	4,927,932				
Sources
Footnotes: ^{1} United We Can results are compared to the combined totals of We Can and United Left–Popular Unity in Common in the 2015 election.

=== Murcia ===
← Summary of the 26 June 2016 Congress of Deputies election results in Murcia →
Parties and alliances	Popular vote			Seats	
Parties and alliances	Votes	%	±pp	Total	+/−
People's Party (PP)	333,109	46.68	+6.28	5	±0
Spanish Socialist Workers' Party (PSOE)	144,937	20.31	−0.01	2	±0
Citizens–Party of the Citizenry (C's)	111,961	15.69	−1.98	2	±0
United We Can (Podemos–IU–Equo)^{1}	103,522	14.51	−3.82	1	±0
Animalist Party Against Mistreatment of Animals (PACMA)	8,209	1.15	+0.24	0	±0
Vox (Vox)	2,622	0.37	−0.08	0	±0
Union, Progress and Democracy (UPyD)	2,083	0.29	−0.46	0	±0
Zero Cuts–Green Group (Recortes Cero–GV)	1,305	0.18	+0.01	0	±0
Blank Seats (EB)	1,069	0.15	±0.00	0	±0
Communist Party of the Peoples of Spain (PCPE)	627	0.09	−0.05	0	±0
Internationalist Solidarity and Self-Management (SAIn)	235	0.03	−0.02	0	±0
Spain Elders' Force (FME)	200	0.03	New	0	±0
Blank ballots	3,713	0.52	−0.10		
Total	713,592			10	±0
Valid votes	713,592	99.17	+0.04		
Invalid votes	5,944	0.83	−0.04		
Votes cast / turnout	719,536	69.58	−1.56		
Abstentions	314,539	30.42	+1.56		
Registered voters	1,034,075				
Sources
Footnotes: ^{1} United We Can results are compared to the combined totals of We Can and Popular Unity in Common–United Left/Greens in the 2015 election.

=== Navarre ===
← Summary of the 26 June 2016 Congress of Deputies election results in Navarre →
Parties and alliances	Popular vote			Seats	
Parties and alliances	Votes	%	±pp	Total	+/−
Navarrese People's Union–People's Party (UPN–PP)	106,976	31.90	+2.96	2	±0
United We Can (Podemos–IU–Equo–Batzarre)^{1}	94,972	28.32	+1.23	2	±0
Spanish Socialist Workers' Party (PSOE)	58,173	17.35	+1.83	1	±0
Basque Country Gather (EH Bildu)	31,374	9.36	−0.53	0	±0
Citizens–Party of the Citizenry (C's)	20,505	6.11	−0.96	0	±0
Yes to the Future (GBai)	14,343	4.28	−4.39	0	±0
Animalist Party Against Mistreatment of Animals (PACMA)	2,757	0.82	+0.16	0	±0
Zero Cuts–Green Group (Recortes Cero–GV)	1,089	0.32	+0.05	0	±0
Union, Progress and Democracy (UPyD)	591	0.18	−0.23	0	±0
Navarrese Freedom (Ln)	548	0.16	±0.00	0	±0
Internationalist Solidarity and Self-Management (SAIn)	539	0.16	−0.10	0	±0
Blank ballots	3,468	1.03	−0.02		
Total	335,335			5	±0
Valid votes	335,335	99.00	−0.13		
Invalid votes	3,385	1.00	+0.13		
Votes cast / turnout	338,720	67.40	−3.53		
Abstentions	163,810	32.60	+3.53		
Registered voters	502,530				
Sources
Footnotes: ^{1} United We Can results are compared to the combined totals of We Can and United Left–Assembly–Popular Unity in Common in the 2015 election.

=== Valencian Community ===
← Summary of the 26 June 2016 Congress of Deputies election results in the Valencian Community →
Parties and alliances	Popular vote			Seats	
Parties and alliances	Votes	%	±pp	Total	+/−
People's Party (PP)	919,229	35.44	+4.18	13	+2
The Valencian Way (Podemos–Compromís–EUPV)^{1}	659,771	25.44	−3.86	9	±0
Spanish Socialist Workers' Party (PSOE)	539,278	20.79	+0.96	6	−1
Citizens–Party of the Citizenry (C's)	388,127	14.96	−0.88	5	±0
Animalist Party Against Mistreatment of Animals (PACMA)	32,611	1.26	+0.33	0	±0
We Are Valencian (SOMVAL)	6,647	0.26	+0.03	0	±0
Citizens of Democratic Centre (CCD)	6,273	0.24	−0.10	0	±0
Vox (Vox)	6,095	0.23	−0.04	0	±0
Union, Progress and Democracy (UPyD)	5,585	0.22	−0.43	0	±0
Zero Cuts–Green Group (Recortes Cero–GV)	4,798	0.18	−0.01	0	±0
Communist Party of the Peoples of Spain (PCPE)	3,551	0.14	−0.02	0	±0
The Eco-pacifist Greens (Centro Moderado)	3,011	0.12	±0.00	0	±0
Spanish Phalanx of the CNSO (FE de las JONS)	1,941	0.07	New	0	±0
Libertarian Party (P–LIB)	992	0.04	+0.02	0	±0
Political Renovation (RePo)	570	0.02	New	0	±0
Blank ballots	15,415	0.59	−0.01		
Total	2,593,894			33	+1
Valid votes	2,593,894	99.13	−0.01		
Invalid votes	22,874	0.87	+0.01		
Votes cast / turnout	2,616,768	72.37	−2.42		
Abstentions	999,065	27.63	+2.42		
Registered voters	3,615,833				
Sources
Footnotes: ^{1} The Valencian Way results are compared to the combined totals of It is Time and United Left of the Valencian Country–Popular Unity in Common in the 2015 election.

== Autonomous cities ==
=== Ceuta ===
← Summary of the 26 June 2016 Congress of Deputies election results in Ceuta →
Parties and alliances	Popular vote			Seats	
Parties and alliances	Votes	%	±pp	Total	+/−
People's Party (PP)	15,991	51.86	+7.00	1	±0
Spanish Socialist Workers' Party (PSOE)	6,974	22.62	−0.48	0	±0
Citizens–Party of the Citizenry (C's)	3,549	11.51	−1.79	0	±0
United We Can (Podemos–IU–Equo)^{1}	3,345	10.85	−4.53	0	±0
Animalist Party Against Mistreatment of Animals (PACMA)	333	1.08	±0.00	0	±0
Vox (Vox)	139	0.45	New	0	±0
Zero Cuts–Green Group (Recortes Cero–GV)	118	0.38	−0.06	0	±0
Union, Progress and Democracy (UPyD)	72	0.23	−0.37	0	±0
Blank ballots	316	1.02	−0.23		
Total	30,837			1	±0
Valid votes	30,837	98.86	+0.33		
Invalid votes	357	1.14	−0.33		
Votes cast / turnout	31,194	50.65	−3.19		
Abstentions	30,393	49.35	+3.19		
Registered voters	61,587				
Sources
Footnotes: ^{1} United We Can results are compared to the combined totals of We Can and United Left–Popular Unity in Common in the 2015 election.

=== Melilla ===
← Summary of the 26 June 2016 Congress of Deputies election results in Melilla →
Parties and alliances	Popular vote			Seats	
Parties and alliances	Votes	%	±pp	Total	+/−
People's Party (PP)	13,522	49.86	+5.95	1	±0
Spanish Socialist Workers' Party (PSOE)	6,805	25.09	+0.50	0	±0
Citizens–Party of the Citizenry (C's)	3,352	12.36	−3.19	0	±0
United We Can (Unidos Podemos)^{1}	2,667	9.83	−2.92	0	±0
Animalist Party Against Mistreatment of Animals (PACMA)	317	1.17	+0.05	0	±0
Union, Progress and Democracy (UPyD)	146	0.54	−0.31	0	±0
Zero Cuts–Green Group (Recortes Cero–GV)	44	0.16	±0.00	0	±0
Blank ballots	268	0.99	−0.07		
Total	27,121			1	±0
Valid votes	27,121	99.68	−0.04		
Invalid votes	362	1.32	+0.04		
Votes cast / turnout	27,483	47.55	−1.80		
Abstentions	30,312	52.45	+1.80		
Registered voters	57,795				
Sources
Footnotes: ^{1} United We Can results are compared to the combined totals of We Can and Popular Unity–United Left in the 2015 election.
