= Pere Joan Pons =

Spanish politician (born 1970)

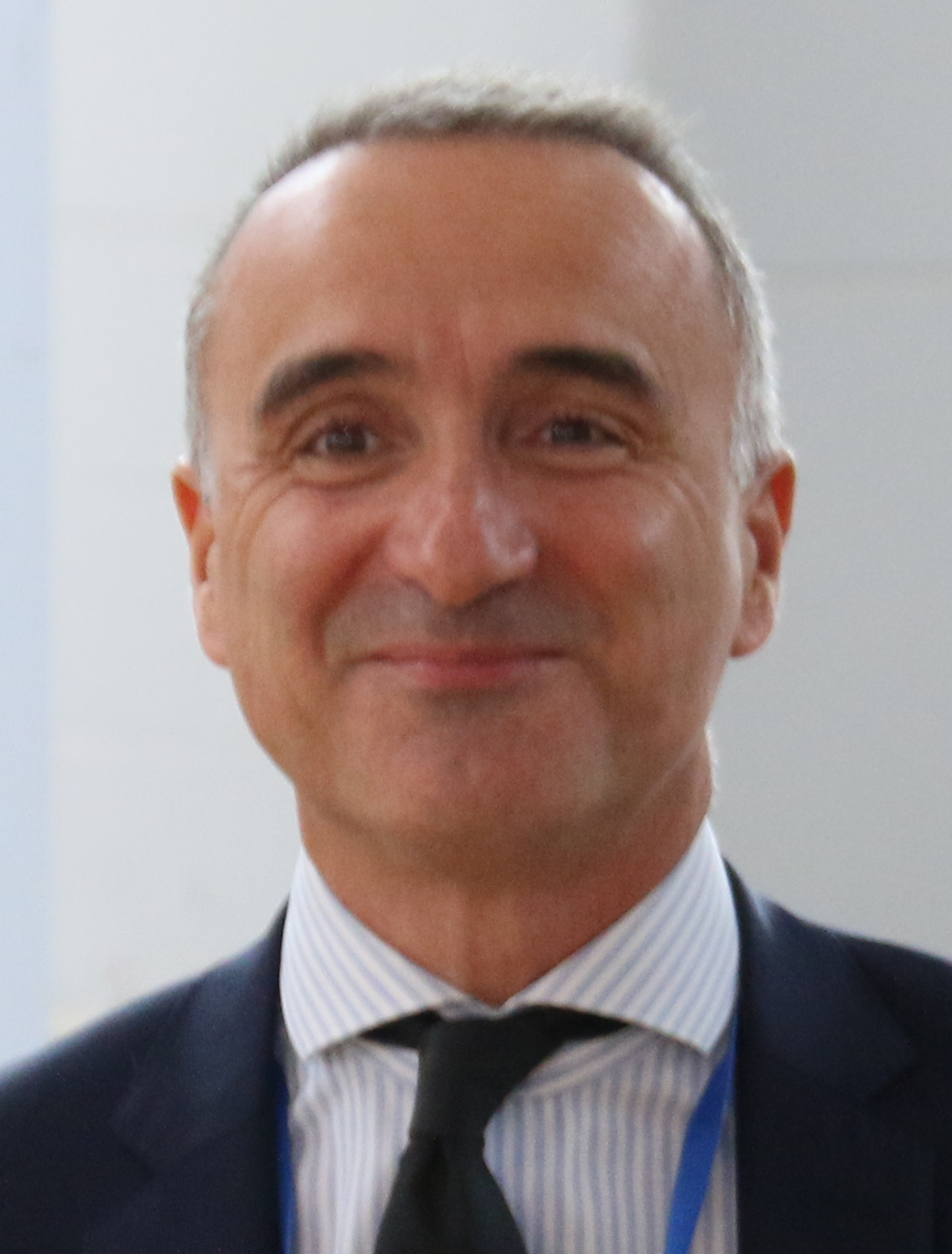
- Pons in 2024

Member of the Senate
- Incumbent
- Assumed office 17 August 2023
- Constituency: Mallorca

Member of the Congress of Deputies
- In office 19 July 2016 – 30 May 2023
- Constituency: Balearic Islands

Personal details
- Born: 24 July 1970 (age 55)
- Party: Spanish Socialist Workers' Party

Pere Joan Pons Sampietro (born 24 July 1970) is a Spanish politician of the Spanish Socialist Workers' Party serving as a member of the Senate since 2023. From 2016 to 2023, he was a member of the Congress of Deputies.
