= Miquel Jerez =

Spanish politician (born 1974)

Member of the Senate
- Incumbent
- Assumed office 28 July 2023
- Appointed by: Parliament of the Balearic Islands

Member of the Congress of Deputies
- In office 3 December 2019 – 17 August 2023
- Constituency: Balearic Islands

Personal details
- Born: 28 January 1974 (age 52)
- Party: People's Party

Miguel Àngel Jerez Juan (born 28 January 1974) is a Spanish politician serving as a member of the Senate since 2023. From 2019 to 2023, he was a member of the Congress of Deputies.
