= Rosa Cursach =

Spanish feminist philosopher, theologian, and politician

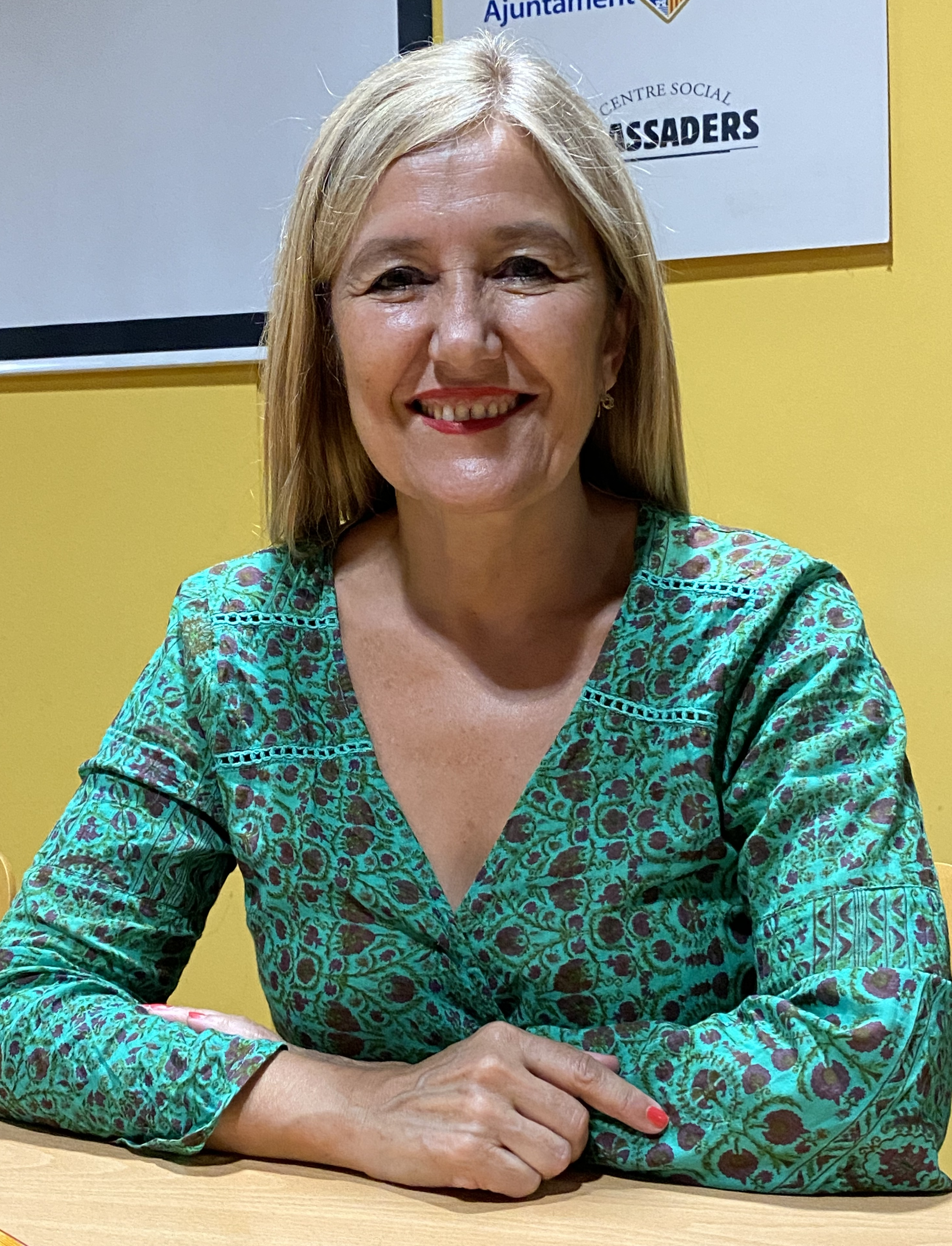
- Born: Rosa Cursach Salas; 15 February 1967 (age 59); Artà, Spain
- Education: Center for Theological Studies of Mallorca; University of the Balearic Islands
- Occupations: Philosopher, theologian, politician
- Political party: Més per Mallorca

Rosa Cursach Salas (born 15 February 1967) is a Spanish feminist philosopher, theologian, and politician.

== Biography ==
Rosa Cursach was born in Artà in 1967. She studied theology at the Center for Theological Studies of Mallorca, and philosophy at the University of the Balearic Islands (UIB). Until 2015, she worked as a teacher of Compulsory Secondary Education and of Baccalaureate Religion, Ethics, and Philosophy at the Colegio Beato Ramon Llull in Inca.

She is the founder of the organization Creients i Feministes, and has also worked with UIB's Inequalities, Gender, and Public Policies group.

Cursach has carried out numerous investigations and publications on feminism and equality, and has given courses and lectures in which she analyzes gender paradigms, public policies, experiences of equality policies in Spain, feminism, and religion and human rights.

In July 2015, she was appointed director of the Balearic Women's Institute. Four years later, in July 2019, as a member of the Més per Mallorca political coalition, Cursach was appointed Director of Equality of the Insular Council of Mallorca, an institution within the Department of the Presidency, in charge of care services for women and victims of gender violence.

Cursach topped the Veus Progressistes coalition's Senate list in the April 2019 Spanish general election. However, none of the candidates obtained a seat.
