= Progressives for the Balearic Islands =

Progressives for the Balearic Islands Progressistes per les Illes Balears
- Leader: Nanda Ramon
- Founded: 2003
- Dissolved: 2004
- Succeeded by: Unity for the Isles
- Ideology: Socialism; Ecologism; Catalan nationalism Regionalism
- Political position: Left-wing

Progressives for the Balearic Islands (Catalan: Progressistes per les Illes Balears), or simply Progressives (Catalan: Progressistes), was a Spanish party alliance formed by PSM–Nationalist Agreement, United Left, The Greens and Republican Left of Catalonia to contest the 2004 general election in the Balearic Islands.

== Composition ==
Party
PSM–Nationalist Agreement (PSM–EN)
United Left (EUIB)
The Greens of the Balearic Islands (EVIB)
Republican Left of Catalonia (ERC)
