= Unity for the Isles =

Unity for the Isles Unitat per les Illes
- Leader: Pere Sampol
- Founded: 2008
- Preceded by: Progressives for the Balearic Islands
- Ideology: Social democracy Socialism; Ecologism; Catalan nationalism Regionalism

Website
- www.unitatxilles.cat

Unity for the Isles (Catalan: Unitat per les Illes, Spanish: Unidad por las Islas, UIB) was a Spanish party alliance formed by PSM–Nationalist Agreement (PSM–EN), Majorcan Union (UM), Republican Left of Catalonia (ERC), Agreement for Majorca (ExM) and The Greens of Menorca (EV–Me) to contest the 2008 general election in the Balearic Islands.

United Left had tried to re-edit the Progressives for the Balearic Islands coalition which had contested the 2004 general election, but the PSM–EN choose instead to form an alliance with UM, ERC and ExM, which had announced their will to field a joint list of candidates.

== Composition ==
Party
PSM–Nationalist Agreement (PSM–EN)
Majorcan Union (UM)
Republican Left of Catalonia (ERC)
Agreement for Majorca (ExM)
The Greens of Menorca (EV–Me)
