= Entesa per Mallorca =

Agreement for Mallorca Entesa per Mallorca
- Leader: Biel Huguet
- Secretary-General: Jaume Sansó
- Founded: 11 August 2006
- Dissolved: 23 February 2013
- Split from: Socialist Party of Majorca
- Merged into: PSM–Agreement
- Headquarters: C/ Morey, 11, 07001; Palma, Majorca
- Ideology: Democratic socialism Ecologism; Catalan nationalism

Website
- entesapermallorca.com

Entesa per Mallorca (English: Agreement for Mallorca, ExM), or Entesa, was a nationalist and progressist political party in Majorca. It was founded in 2006 by former members of the Socialist Party of Majorca (PSM) who disagreed with the creation of the coalition Bloc for Majorca. In October 2006, ExM held its first congress, with the main objective of participating in the 2007 local elections in Majorca.

In 2009, ExM joined Republican Left (ERC) in the Balearic Islands to participate in the 2009 European election, within the coalition Europe of the Peoples–Greens.

Between 2011 and 2013, it was part of a coalition with the PSM and IniciativaVerds (IV), taking part in the 2011 regional election. In 2013, the party merged into the PSM to form the new coalition PSM–Entesa.

== Electoral performance ==
=== Parliament of the Balearic Islands ===
Date	Votes			Seats		Status	Size
Date	#	%	±pp	#	±	Status	Size
2011	36,181	8.6%	—	0 / 59	—	N/A	*

- * Within Socialist Party of Majorca–Initiative Greens–Agreement.

=== Cortes Generales ===
==== Balearic Islands ====
Congress of Deputies
Date	Votes			Seats		Size
Date	#	%	±pp	#	±	Size
2008	25,454	5.4%	—	0 / 8	—	*
2011	31,417	7.2%	N/A	0 / 8	0	**

Senate
Date	Seats		Size
Date	#	±	Size
2008	0 / 5	—	*
2011	0 / 5	0	**

- * Within Unity for the Isles.
- ** Within PSM–Initiative Greens–Agreement–Equo.

=== European Parliament ===
Spain
Date	Votes			Seats		Size
Date	#	%	±pp	#	±	Size
2009	394,938	2.5%	—	0 / 54	—	*

Balearic Islands
Date	Votes			Size
Date	#	%	±pp	Size
2009**	7,651	3.0%	—	4th

- * Within Europe of the Peoples–Greens.
- ** In coalition with Republican Left.
