= Més per Mallorca =

- Secretary-General: David Abril; Bel Busquets
- Founded: 12 July 2013
- Merger of: Socialist Party of Majorca; IniciativaVerds; Entesa per Mallorca; Bloc per Felanitx
- Ideology: Democratic socialism Green politics Left-wing nationalism Catalan nationalism Regionalism
- Political position: Left-wing
- National affiliation: Unidos Podemos (2016–2019); Sumar (since 2023)
- Regional affiliation: Units Podem Més (2016–2019); Veus Progressistes (2019); Més Esquerra (2019); Ara Més (since 2022); Sumar Més (2023–2026)
- Colours
- Congress of Deputies (Balearic seats): 1 / 8
- Senate (Balearic seats): 0 / 7
- European Parliament (Spanish seats): 0 / 61
- Balearic Parliament (Majorcan seats): 4 / 33
- Council of Majorca: 4 / 33
- Mayors: 10 / 54
- Town councilors: 101 / 925

Website
- mespermallorca.cat

Més per Mallorca (English: More for Majorca, MÉS) is a Majorcan political party and coalition formed in 2013 by the Socialist Party of Majorca (PSM), IniciativaVerds (IV) and Entesa per Mallorca (ExM), as well as other small local parties around the island.

== History ==
The predecessor coalition, PSM–Iniciativa–Verds, was created in 2010 in an effort to unite the ecologist and progressive Majorcan nationalist political organisations under a common platform after the dissolution of the Bloc for Majorca (Bloc). In summer 2010, an electoral coalition between the PSM, Iniciativa and EV was established to run the 2011 regional election. In November 2010, Iniciativa and EV merged to become IV, and in early 2011 ExM joined the coalition, renaming it to PSM–IV–Entesa.

At the 2011 regional election, the coalition received 36,149 votes, which translated to four seats in the Parliament of the Balearic Islands. Additionally, it obtained four seats in the Council of Majorca, and three seats in the Palma City Council.

On 2 February 2013, the members of the coalition's three member parties gathered in an open assembly and decided to take the coalition a step further, adopting a "call document" as well as the current name Més per Mallorca. On 26 October 2013, coalition members participated in another assembly where a set of Operating Rules were adopted and an executive commission was elected, with Biel Barceló (PSM) as general coordinator and co-spokesperson, and Fina Santiago (IV) as co-spokesperson.

On 24 May 2015, the coalition got the greatest historical result by any of its member parties in the regional election, receiving 59,069 votes (14%) and 6 out of the 33 seats in the Mallorca electoral district.

In April 2016, David Abril (IV) and Bel Busquets (PSM) were elected co-spokespersons.

In March 2017, a fraudulent contract to the campaign manager of Més made by Barceló, Vice President of the Government, appeared in the media. This fact created a crisis in the Government and ended up with the resignation of the Regional Minister of Transparency, Ruth Mateu, and the withdrawal of her party, More for Menorca, from the Government, although remaining as an outer supporter. In December 2017, Barceló was accused of accepting a personal travel as a gift. This fact, along with controversies and internal disputes since March, made him resign as Vice President and Regional Minister of Tourism, being relieved by Busquets.

In June 2018, Miquel Ensenyat (PSM), president of the Island Council of Majorca, won Més primaries over Santiago, Regional Minister of Social Services, thus becoming its candidate for the 2019 regional election.

== Member parties ==
- Socialist Party of Majorca (PSM)
- IniciativaVerds (IV)
- Agreement for Majorca (ExM)

== Electoral performance ==
=== Parliament of the Balearic Islands ===
Date	Votes			Seats		Status	Size
Date	#	%	±pp	#	±	Status	Size
2015	59,617	13.8%	+5.2	6 / 59	2 (Note: Compared to PSM–IV–ExM totals in the 2011 Balearic regional election.)	Government	4th
2019	39,415	9.2%	–4.6	4 / 59	2	Government	5th
2023	37,651	8.4%	–0.8	4 / 59	0	Opposition	4th

=== Island Council of Majorca ===
Date	Votes			Seats		Status	Size
Date	#	%	±pp	#	±	Status	Size
2015	59,992	17.3%	+6.8	6 / 33	2 (Note: Compared to PSM–IV–ExM totals in the 2011 Island Council of Mallorca elections.)	Government	3rd
2019	42,692	12.7%	–4.6	4 / 33	2	Government	3rd
2023	42,197	11.7%	–1.0	4 / 33	0	Opposition	4th

=== Cortes Generales ===
==== Balearic Islands ====
Congress of Deputies
Date	Votes			Seats		Size
Date	#	%	±pp	#	±	Size
2015	33,877	7.0%	–0.2	0 / 8	0	5th
2016	118,082	25.4%	N/A	0 / 8	0	*
Apr. 2019	25,384	4.9%	N/A	0 / 8	0	**
Nov. 2019	18,295	4.0%	N/A	0 / 8	0	***
2023	83,487	16.59%	N/A	1 / 8	1	****

Senate
Date	Seats		Size
Date	#	±	Size
2015	0 / 5	0	5th
2016	0 / 5	0	*
Apr. 2019	0 / 5	0	**
Nov. 2019	0 / 5	1	***

- * Within Units Podem Més
- ** Within Veus Progressistes
- *** Within Més Esquerra
- **** Within Sumar Més
