= Sovereignty for the Isles =

Sovereignty for the Isles Sobirania per a les Illes
- Leader: Mateu Matas 'Xurí'
- Founded: 2016
- Merger of: Independents; Eivissa Sí
- Merged into: Veus Progressistes
- Ideology: Souverainism; Catalan nationalism
- Congress of Deputies: 0 / 350
- Spanish Senate: 0 / 266

Website
- www.sobirania.cat

Sovereignty for the Isles (Catalan for Sobirania per a les Illes) was a sovereignty coalition formed by independents of Balearic Islands. In 2016 Spanish general election it was driven by Mateu Matas 'Xurí', followed by Joan Albert Pons, Jaume Sastre, Margalida Llompart, Maite Pons, Margalida Miquel, Jonathan Marí, Antònia Font, Josep Planas, Carme Rocamora, Andreu Caballero, Teresa Sastre, Nicolau Dols, Guillem Morro and Maria Antònia Oliver.

The results were 7,413 votes in the Balearic Islands district, meaning a 1.6% of the vote share and no seats.
