= Veus Progressistes =

Balearic Islands political party

Progressive Voices Veus Progressistes
- Abbreviation: VP
- Leader: Guillem Balboa
- Founded: 13 March 2019
- Dissolved: October 2019
- Merger of: Més; MpM; Ara; ERC
- Succeeded by: More Left
- Ideology: Catalan nationalism Progressivism; Ecologism; Souverainism
- Political position: Left-wing

Website
- latevadecisio.cat

Progressive Voices (Catalan: Veus Progressistes) was an electoral alliance formed by More for Mallorca (Més), More for Menorca (MpM), Now Eivissa (Ara Eivissa) and Republican Left of Catalonia (ERC) to contest the April 2019 Spanish general election in the Balearic Islands. Guillem Balboa, then mayor of Alaró, headed the candidacy, which did not win any seat with a score of less than 5% of the valid votes.

In the Senate, in the constituency of Mallorca, Més and ERC ran in coalition with We Can (Podemos) and United Left of the Balearic Islands (EUIB), styling it as Unidas Podemos Veus Progressistes, as a repetition of the 2016 coalition United We Can–More. However, in Menorca, MpM ran alone, as did Ara in the Ibiza–Formentera constituency. None of the candidacies obtained any seat.

== Composition ==
Party
| More for Mallorca (Més) |
| More for Menorca (MpM) |
| Now Eivissa (Ara Eivissa) |
| Republican Left of Catalonia (ERC) |

== Electoral performance ==
=== Cortes Generales ===
Cortes Generales
| Election | Balearic Islands | | | | |
| Election | Congress | | | | |
| Election | Vote | % | Score | Seats | +/– |
| 2019 (Apr) | 25,191 | 4.86% | 6th | 0 / 8 | 0 |
