= Sumar Més =

Unite More Sumar Més
- Leader: Vicenç Vidal
- Founded: 9 June 2023
- Dissolved: 16 October 2026
- Headquarters: Palma (Mallorca)
- Ideology: Democratic socialism Progressivism; Catalanism; Ecologism
- Political position: Left-wing
- Colours: Cerise; Green
- Members: See list of members

Sumar Més (English: "Unite More"), was an electoral coalition formed by More for Mallorca (Més), More for Menorca (MxMe) and Unite (Sumar) in June 2023 to contest that year's 23 July general election in the Balearic Islands. Més Senator Vicenç Vidal is the leading candidate of the coalition.

== Composition ==
Party
More for Mallorca (Més)
More for Menorca (MxMe)
Unite (Sumar)
Unite Movement (SMR)
We Can (Podem)
United Left of the Balearic Islands (EUIB)

== Electoral results ==
=== Cortes Generales ===
Cortes Generales
Election	Balearic Islands			
Election	Congress			
Election	Votes	%	Seats	+/–
2023	83,487	16.59 (#3)	1 / 8	1
