= Més Esquerra =

More Left Més Esquerra
- Leader: Guillem Balboa
- Founded: 23 September 2019
- Dissolved: 2019
- Merger of: Més; MxMe; ERC
- Preceded by: Progressive Voices
- Succeeded by: Ara Més
- Ideology: Catalan nationalism Progressivism; Ecologism
- Political position: Left-wing

More Left (Catalan: Més Esquerra) was an electoral alliance formed by More for Mallorca (Més), More for Menorca (MxMe) and Republican Left of Catalonia (ERC) to contest the November 2019 Spanish general election in the Balearic Islands, as a successor of the Progressive Voices coalition that ran in the April election, without the participation of Now Ibiza (Ara), that gave external support. Guillem Balboa, who headed the predecessor candidacy, was also the candidate for this alliance, which did not win any seat with a score of just over 4% of the valid votes.

== Composition ==
Party
More for Mallorca (Més)
More for Menorca (MxMe)
Republican Left of Catalonia (ERC)

== Electoral performance ==
=== Cortes Generales ===
Cortes Generales
Election	Balearic Islands				
Election	Congress				
Election	Vote	%	Score	Seats	+/–
2019 (Nov)	18,295	4.03	6th	0 / 8	0
