= Popular Unity (Spain) =

Popular Unity Unidad Popular
- Abbreviation: IU–UPeC
- Candidate: Alberto Garzón
- Founded: 22 October 2015
- Dissolved: 9 May 2016
- Merger of: IU; CHA; Batzarre; CLI–AS; IzCa; IAS; Segoviemos
- Preceded by: Plural Left
- Succeeded by: Unidos Podemos
- Ideology: Socialism; Republicanism; Feminism; Anti-capitalism
- Political position: Left-wing

Website
- unidadpopular.es

Popular Unity (Spanish: Unidad Popular) was a political and electoral alliance in Spain. The alliance was organized in 2015 to contest the 2015 general election. Alberto Garzón was its lead candidate. In the 2015 election, it won two seats in the 350-seat Congress of Deputies.

== Composition ==
Party	Scope
United Left (IU)	—
Popular Unity in Common (UPeC)	—
Aragonese Union (CHA)	Aragon
Asturian Left (IAS)	Asturias
Left (I–E)	Navarre
Building the Left–Socialist Alternative (CLI–AS)	—
Segoviemos (Segoviemos)	Segovia
Castilian Left (IzCa)	Valladolid

== Electoral performance ==
=== Cortes Generales ===
Cortes Generales
Election	Leading candidate	Congress			Senate			Gov.
Election	Leading candidate	Votes	%	Seats	Votes	%	Seats	Gov.
2015	Alberto Garzón	926,783	3.7 (#5)	2 / 350	2,372,637	3.6 (#5)	0 / 208	—
