= PSM–Nationalist Agreement =

PSM–Nationalist Agreement PSM–Entesa Nacionalista
- Secretary-General: Bel Busquets
- Founded: 1998
- Dissolved: 2015
- Preceded by: Nationalist Left of the Balearic Islands Federation
- Succeeded by: Més per Mallorca; Més per Menorca
- Headquarters: C/Isidoro Antillón, 9, bajo, 07006 - Palma de Mallorca
- Ideology: Democratic socialism Environmentalism; Catalan nationalism Catalan independentism
- European affiliation: European Free Alliance
- Congress of Deputies: 0 / 350
- Spanish Senate: 0 / 264
- European Parliament: 0 / 50
- Parliament of the Balearic Islands: 4 / 59
- Island Council of Mallorca: 5 / 33
- Island Council of Menorca: 1 / 13

Website
- www.psm-entesa.cat

The PSM–Nationalist Agreement (Catalan: PSM–Entesa Nacionalista, PSM–EN) was a democratic socialist, environmentalist and Catalan nationalist political party of the Balearic Isles, Spain. The PSM–EN was a federated party consisting of five constituent parties.

== Composition ==
Party	Notes
Socialist Party of Mallorca (PSM)	
Socialist Party of Menorca (PSM)	
Nationalist and Ecologist Agreement (ENE)	
Independents of Artà (IA)	from January 2000.
Independents of Puigpunyent and Galilea (IPG)	from February 2003.
Independent Group of Son Carrió (GISCa)	March 2003 – 2007.
