= Units Podem Més =

- Founded: 13 May 2016
- Dissolved: February 2019
- Merger of: Podemos; EUIB; Més per Mallorca
- Headquarters: Palma de Mallorca
- Political position: Left-wing
- National affiliation: Unidos Podemos
- Congress of Deputies: 2 / 8
- Spanish Senate: 1 / 7

Units Podem Més (English: "United We Can–More") was an electoral coalition formed by Podemos, United Left of the Balearic Islands and Més per Mallorca in May 2016 to contest the 2016 Spanish general election in the Balearic Islands.

== Composition ==
Party
We Can (Podemos)
United Left of the Balearic Islands (EUIB)
More for Majorca (Més)

== Electoral performance ==
=== Cortes Generales ===
Cortes Generales
Election	Balearic Islands						
Election	Congress					Senate	
Election	Vote	%	Score	Seats	+/–	Seats	+/–
2016	118,082	25.41%	2nd	2 / 8	0	1 / 5	0
