= Opinion polling for the 2019 Spanish local elections (Balearic Islands) =

In the run up to the 2019 Spanish local elections, various organisations carried out opinion polling to gauge voting intention in local entities in Spain. Results of such polls for municipalities and island councils in the Balearic Islands are displayed in this article. The date range for these opinion polls is from the previous local elections, held on 24 May 2015, to the day the next elections were held, on 26 May 2019.

Polls are listed in reverse chronological order, showing the most recent first and using the dates when the survey fieldwork was done, as opposed to the date of publication. Where the fieldwork dates are unknown, the date of publication is given instead. The highest percentage figure in each polling survey is displayed with its background shaded in the leading party's colour. If a tie ensues, this is applied to the figures with the highest percentages. The "Lead" columns on the right shows the percentage-point difference between the parties with the highest percentages in a given poll.

== Municipalities ==
=== Ibiza (town) ===
Polling firm/Commissioner	Fieldwork date	Sample size	Turnout	PP	PSIB–PSOE	G	EPIC	Más	ERC	AL–in	PxE	Podemos–EUIB	Cs	Ara	Lead
2019 municipal election	26 May 2019	—N/a	47.7	29.3; 8	32.7; 9	(Note: Within Ara.)	4.7; 0	(Note: Within PxE.)			4.2; 0	10.3; 2	9.5; 2	3.7; 0	3.4
IBES/Última Hora	15 Oct–2 Nov 2018	?	?	28.0; 7	26.0; 6	2.0; 0	6.0; 1		2.0; 0		5.0; 1	12.0; 3	12.0; 3	–	2.0
2015 municipal election	24 May 2015	—N/a	47.2	31.3; 8	28.8; 8	16.4; 4	6.7; 1	4.7; 0	3.2; 0	1.5; 0	–	–	–	–	2.5

=== Palma ===
Color key:

Poll conducted after legal ban on opinion polls

Polling firm/Commissioner	Fieldwork date	Sample size	Turnout	PP	PSIB–PSOE	Més	Podem	Cs	EUIB	El Pi	Unidas Podemos	Vox	Lead
2019 municipal election	26 May 2019	—N/a	50.2	18.8; 6	26.5; 9	10.4; 3	(Note: Within Unidas Podemos.)	12.2; 4		3.7; 0	10.8; 3	13.2; 4	7.7
IBES/IB3	20–25 May 2019	800	?	18.8; 5/7	25.0; 8/9	13.5; 4/5		9.9; 2/3		–	13.8; 4/5	11.4; 3/4	6.2
IBES/Última Hora	13–16 May 2019	400	?	19.0; 6/7	26.0; 8/9	12.0; 3/4		15.0; 4/5		3.0; 0	13.0; 3/4	10.0; 2/3	7.0
Sigma Dos/El Mundo	13–14 May 2019	?	?	19.3; 6	25.5; 8	13.6; 4		17.5; 5/6		4.1; 0	11.2; 3/4	6.6; 2	6.2
Gadeso	30 Apr–11 May 2019	?	59–61	17.2; 5	22.0; 7	13.9; 4		18.9; 5/6		6.3; 0/1	13.9; 4	8.3; 2/3	3.1
IBES/Última Hora	18–29 Jun 2018	1,000	?	22.0; 7/8	17.0; 5/6	14.0; 4/5	12.0; 4	20.0; 6/7	3.0; 0	6.0; 1/2	–	–	2.0
IBES/Última Hora	25–29 Sep 2017	400	?	28.0; 9/10	21.0; 7	13.0; 4	12.0; 4	14.0; 4/5	2.0; 0	5.0; 1	–	–	7.0
2015 municipal election	24 May 2015	—N/a	54.1	26.6; 9	18.9; 6	15.7; 5	14.8 (Note: Results for SomPalma.); 5	11.7; 4	4.0 (Note: Result for Guanyem Palma.); 0	3.7; 0	–	–	7.7

=== Sant Josep de sa Talaia ===
Polling firm/Commissioner	Fieldwork date	Sample size	Turnout	PSIB–PSOE	PP	G	AL–in	EPIC	Podemos–EUIB	Cs	PxE	Ara	Vox	Lead
2019 municipal election	26 May 2019	—N/a	46.5	33.2; 8	22.7; 5			2.2; 0	12.0; 3	8.0; 2	5.4; 1	5.4; 1	5.4; 1	10.5
IBES/Última Hora	15 Oct–2 Nov 2018	?	?	29.0; 7	23.0; 5	5.0; 1		2.0; 0	12.0; 3	12.0; 3	9.0; 2	–	–	6.0
2015 municipal election	24 May 2015	—N/a	47.1	32.7; 9	25.0; 6	14.6; 4	8.4; 2	2.8; 0	–	–	–	–	–	7.7

=== Santa Eulària des Riu ===
Polling firm/Commissioner	Fieldwork date	Sample size	Turnout	PP	PSIB–PSOE	G	EPIC	Más	AL–in	PxE	Podem	Cs	Podemos–EUIB	Ara	Lead
2019 municipal election	26 May 2019	—N/a	48.4	51.6; 13	23.4; 6		1.5; 0			0.8; 0		4.9; 0	10.9; 2	2.9; 0	28.2
IBES/Última Hora	15 Oct–2 Nov 2018	?	?	45.0; 11	21.0; 5	2.0; 0	2.0; 0			4.0; 0	12.0; 3	9.0; 2	–	–	24.0
2015 municipal election	24 May 2015	—N/a	46.2	48.3; 12	21.9; 5	15.3; 4	3.2; 0	2.6; 0	1.2; 0	–	–	–	–	–	26.4

== Island Councils ==
=== Ibiza (island) ===
Polling firm/Commissioner	Fieldwork date	Sample size	Turnout	PP	PSIB–PSOE	Podem	GxE	PxE	EPIC	Más	AL–in	Cs	G	Vox	Ara	Unides Podem–EUIB	Lead
2019 island council election	26 May 2019	—N/a	49.4	39.4; 6	28.5; 4		–	2.9; 0	2.0; 0			6.9; 1		4.1; 0	3.0; 0	12.0; 2	10.9
IBES/Última Hora	13–16 May 2019	300	?	26.0; 4/5	28.0; 4/5		–	5.0; 0	3.0; 0			11.0; 1/2		6.0; 0/1	3.0; 0	14.0; 2	2.0
IBES/Última Hora	15–19 Oct 2018	300	?	30.0; 5	22.0; 3/4	16.0; 2	3.0; 0	7.0; 0/1	2.0; 0			14.0; 2	2.0; 0	–	–	–	8.0
2015 island council election	24 May 2015	—N/a	49.3	34.0; 6	23.8; 4	18.9; 3	5.1; 0	4.6; 0	2.5; 0	2.3; 0	1.8; 0	–	–	–	–	–	10.2

=== Mallorca ===
Color key:

Poll conducted after legal ban on opinion polls

Polling firm/Commissioner	Fieldwork date	Sample size	Turnout	PP	PSIB–PSOE	Més	Podem	El Pi	Cs	EUIB	Vox	Unides Podem–EUIB	Lead
2019 island council election	26 May 2019	—N/a	56.2	20.6; 7	26.5; 10	12.7; 4		9.1; 3	10.3; 3		9.1; 3	9.5; 3	5.9
IBES/IB3	20–25 May 2019	1,200	?	17.6; 6/7	25.1; 9/10	13.8; 4/5		7.8; 2/3	12.8; 4/5		9.2; 3/4	10.9; 3/4	7.5
IBES/Última Hora	13–16 May 2019	600	?	21.0; 7/8	24.0; 8/9	14.0; 4/5		7.0; 2/3	12.0; 4/5		8.0; 2/3	11.0; 3/4	3.0
IBES/Última Hora	15–19 Oct 2018	300	?	22.0; 8/9	18.0; 6/7	11.0; 3/4	15.0; 5/6	10.0; 3/4	17.0; 5/6	2.0; 0	3.0; 0	–	4.0
IBES/Última Hora	25–29 Sep 2017	800	?	27.0; 10	20.0; 7/8	14.0; 5	12.0; 4	9.0; 3	11.0; 3/4	2.0; 0	–	–	7.0
2015 island council election	24 May 2015	—N/a	60.2	27.8; 10	17.9; 7	17.3; 6	14.3; 5	9.4; 3	7.3; 2	1.8 (Note: Result for Let's Win the Balearic Islands.); 0	–	–	9.9

=== Menorca ===
Color key:

Poll conducted after legal ban on opinion polls

Polling firm/Commissioner	Fieldwork date	Sample size	Turnout	PP	PSIB–PSOE	MxMe	Podem	Cs	EM	El Pi	Unides Podem–EUIB	Vox	Lead
2019 island council election	26 May 2019	—N/a	58.0	28.6; 4	26.7; 4	17.8; 3		8.6; 1		2.7; 0	11.0; 1	2.7; 0	1.9
IBES/IB3	20–25 May 2019	600	?	20.5; 3	28.0; 4/5	15.0; 2		12.3; 1/2		–	13.2; 1/2	–	7.5
IBES/Última Hora	13–16 May 2019	300	?	23.0; 3/4	27.0; 4/5	14.0; 2		12.0; 1/2		4.0; 0	10.0; 1/2	5.0; 0	4.0
IBES/Última Hora	15–19 Oct 2018	300	?	25.0; 4	24.0; 3/4	13.0; 2	10.0; 1	16.0; 2/3	4.0; 0	4.0; 0	–	–	1.0
2015 island council election	24 May 2015	—N/a	58.4	31.8; 5	22.5; 3	18.7; 3	12.5; 2	5.0 (Note: Result for Citizens of Menorca–Ciutadella de Menorca People's Union.); 0	4.2; 0	3.0; 0	–	–	9.3

== See also ==
- 2019 Balearic island council elections
- 2019 Spanish local elections in the Balearic Islands
