= 2019 Spanish local elections in the Balearic Islands =

This article presents the results breakdown of the local elections held in the Balearic Islands on 26 May 2019. The following tables show detailed results in the autonomous community's most populous municipalities, sorted alphabetically.

== City control ==
The following table lists party control in the most populous municipalities, including provincial capitals (shown in bold). Gains for a party are displayed with the cell's background shaded in that party's colour.

Municipality	Population	Previous control	New control
Calvià	49,333	Socialist Party of the Balearic Islands (PSIB–PSOE)	Socialist Party of the Balearic Islands (PSIB–PSOE)
Ciutadella de Menorca	29,223	Socialist Party of Menorca–More for Menorca (PSM–MxM)	Socialist Party of Menorca–More for Menorca (PSM–MxM)
Ibiza	49,727	Socialist Party of the Balearic Islands (PSIB–PSOE)	Socialist Party of the Balearic Islands (PSIB–PSOE)
Inca	32,137	Socialist Party of the Balearic Islands (PSIB–PSOE)	Socialist Party of the Balearic Islands (PSIB–PSOE)
Llucmajor	36,358	Socialist Party of the Balearic Islands (PSIB–PSOE)	People's Party (PP)
Manacor	42,631	Proposal for the Isles (El Pi)	More for Mallorca–APIB (Més–APIB)
Maó-Mahón	28,592	Now Maó (Ara Maó)	Socialist Party of the Balearic Islands (PSIB–PSOE)
Marratxí	36,725	More for Mallorca–APIB (Més–APIB)	Socialist Party of the Balearic Islands (PSIB–PSOE)
**Palma**	409,661	More for Mallorca–APIB (Més–APIB)	Socialist Party of the Balearic Islands (PSIB–PSOE)
Sant Antoni de Portmany	25,779	Socialist Party of the Balearic Islands (PSIB–PSOE)	People's Party (PP)
Sant Josep de sa Talaia	26,496	Socialist Party of the Balearic Islands (PSIB–PSOE)	Socialist Party of the Balearic Islands (PSIB–PSOE)
Santa Eulària des Riu	36,457	People's Party (PP)	People's Party (PP)

== Municipalities ==
=== Calvià ===
Population: 49,333

← Summary of the 26 May 2019 City Council of Calvià election results →
Parties and alliances	Popular vote			Seats	
Parties and alliances	Votes	%	±pp	Total	+/−
Socialist Party of the Balearic Islands (PSIB–PSOE)	6,717	40.99	+6.57	10	±0
People's Party (PP)	3,628	22.14	−11.40	5	−4
Vox–Citizen Alternative for Tolerance, Unity and Action (Vox–ACTUA Baleares)	1,705	10.40	New	2	+2
Citizens–Party of the Citizenry (Cs)	1,459	8.90	+1.48	2	±0
We Can–More (Més–Podemos)^{1}	1,307	7.98	+0.80	2	±0
Proposal for the Isles (El Pi)	428	2.61	−1.22	0	±0
Transform Calvià (TrC)	284	1.72	New	0	±0
United Left of the Balearic Islands (EUIB)	263	1.60	New	0	±0
Yes We Can Calvià (SSPC)	261	1.59	−8.49	0	−2
Decide Calvià (DeCa)	243	1.48	New	0	±0
Blank ballots	93	0.57	−0.89		
Total	16,388			21	−4
Valid votes	16,388	99.38	+0.49		
Invalid votes	103	0.62	−0.49		
Votes cast / turnout	16,491	50.58	−3.21		
Abstentions	16,110	49.42	+3.21		
Registered voters	32,601				
Sources
Footnotes: ^{1} We Can–More results are compared to Calvià Open Left totals in the 2015 election.

=== Ciutadella de Menorca ===
Population: 29,223

← Summary of the 26 May 2019 City Council of Ciutadella de Menorca election results →
Parties and alliances	Popular vote			Seats	
Parties and alliances	Votes	%	±pp	Total	+/−
Socialist Party of Menorca–More for Menorca (PSM–MxM)	3,391	28.40	+0.67	7	+1
People's Party (PP)	2,632	22.05	−4.99	5	−1
Socialist Party of the Balearic Islands (PSIB–PSOE)	2,144	17.96	+1.88	4	±0
Citizens–Party of the Citizenry (Cs)^{1}	1,594	13.35	+3.83	3	+1
United We Can–People for Ciutadella (Podemos–EM–EUIB–GxC)	1,202	10.07	−2.73	2	−1
Proposal for the Isles (El Pi)	369	3.09	−0.79	0	±0
Vox–Citizen Alternative for Tolerance, Unity and Action (Vox–ACTUA Baleares)	313	2.62	New	0	±0
Act (PACT)	119	1.00	New	0	±0
Spanish Liberal Project (PLIE)	22	0.18	New	0	±0
Blank ballots	153	1.28	−1.67		
Total	11,939			21	±0
Valid votes	11,939	99.21	+0.96		
Invalid votes	95	0.79	−0.96		
Votes cast / turnout	12,034	53.65	+2.18		
Abstentions	10,398	46.35	−2.18		
Registered voters	22,432				
Sources
Footnotes: ^{1} Citizens–Party of the Citizenry results are compared to Ciutadella de Menorca People's Union totals in the 2015 election.

=== Ibiza ===
Population: 49,727

← Summary of the 26 May 2019 City Council of Ibiza election results →
Parties and alliances	Popular vote			Seats	
Parties and alliances	Votes	%	±pp	Total	+/−
Socialist Party of the Balearic Islands (PSIB–PSOE)	5,039	32.66	+3.83	9	+1
People's Party (PP)	4,513	29.25	−1.31	8	±0
United We Can (Podemos–EUIB)	1,591	10.31	New	2	+2
Citizens–Party of the Citizenry (Cs)	1,461	9.47	New	2	+2
EPIC Ibiza Citizen Movement (MC EPIC)	731	4.73	−1.95	0	−1
Vox–Citizen Alternative for Tolerance, Unity and Action (Vox–ACTUA Baleares)	696	4.51	New	0	±0
Proposal for Ibiza (PxE)^{1}	648	4.20	−1.93	0	±0
Now Ibiza–Let's Win the Left (Ara)^{2}	576	3.73	−15.81	0	−4
Blank ballots	172	1.11	−0.35		
Total	15,427			21	±0
Valid votes	15,427	99.11	+0.70		
Invalid votes	138	0.89	−0.70		
Votes cast / turnout	15,565	47.71	+0.48		
Abstentions	17,059	52.29	−0.48		
Registered voters	32,624				
Sources
Footnotes: ^{1} Proposal for Ibiza results are compared to the combined totals of More Ibiza–Democratic Corsairs and Island Alternative in the 2015 election.; ^{2} Now Ibiza–Let's Win the Left results are compared to the combined totals of Let's Win Ibiza and Republican Left–Ibiza Yes–Municipal Agreement in the 2015 election.

=== Inca ===
Population: 32,137

← Summary of the 26 May 2019 City Council of Inca election results →
Parties and alliances	Popular vote			Seats	
Parties and alliances	Votes	%	±pp	Total	+/−
Socialist Party of the Balearic Islands (PSIB–PSOE)	4,902	39.41	+9.08	9	+2
People's Party (PP)	1,865	14.99	−12.57	3	−3
Independents of Inca (INDI)	1,118	8.99	−4.21	2	−1
More for Mallorca–APIB (Més–APIB)	1,072	8.62	−5.58	2	−1
Vox–Citizen Alternative for Tolerance, Unity and Action (Vox–ACTUA Baleares)	986	7.93	New	2	+2
Proposal for the Isles (El Pi)	902	7.25	−0.81	1	−1
Citizens–Party of the Citizenry (Cs)	806	6.48	New	1	+1
United We Can (Podemos–EUIB)^{1}	646	5.19	+1.09	1	+1
Spanish Liberal Project (PLIE)	52	0.42	New	0	±0
Blank ballots	90	0.72	−0.61		
Total	12,439			21	±0
Valid votes	12,439	99.31	+0.16		
Invalid votes	87	0.69	−0.16		
Votes cast / turnout	12,526	56.24	−5.35		
Abstentions	9,746	43.76	+5.35		
Registered voters	22,272				
Sources
Footnotes: ^{1} United We Can results are compared to Let's Win Inca: Unitary Left totals in the 2015 election.

=== Llucmajor ===
Population: 36,358

← Summary of the 26 May 2019 City Council of Llucmajor election results →
Parties and alliances	Popular vote			Seats	
Parties and alliances	Votes	%	±pp	Total	+/−
Socialist Party of the Balearic Islands (PSIB–PSOE)	2,838	21.19	+0.93	5	±0
People's Party (PP)	2,812	20.99	−8.30	5	−3
More for Mallorca–APIB (Més–APIB)	1,375	10.26	−4.73	2	−2
Citizens–Party of the Citizenry (Cs)	1,285	9.59	New	2	+2
Vox–Citizen Alternative for Tolerance, Unity and Action (Vox–ACTUA Baleares)	1,221	9.11	New	2	+2
Freedom Llucmajor (Llibertat Llucmajor)^{1}	1,138	8.50	+6.04	2	+2
Independent Social Group (ASI)	860	6.42	+0.10	1	±0
United We Can (Podemos–EUIB)^{2}	840	6.27	−4.76	1	±0
Proposal for the Isles (El Pi)	801	5.98	−3.55	1	−1
Act (PACT)	76	0.57	New	0	±0
Spanish Liberal Project (PLIE)	17	0.13	−0.72	0	±0
Blank ballots	133	0.99	−1.31		
Total	13,396			21	±0
Valid votes	13,396	99.38	+1.02		
Invalid votes	84	0.62	−1.02		
Votes cast / turnout	13,480	52.41	−3.48		
Abstentions	12,238	47.59	+3.48		
Registered voters	25,718				
Sources
Footnotes: ^{1} Freedom Llucmajor results are compared to the combined totals of Independent Citizens' Union and Independents for the Municipality of Llucmajor in the 2015 election.; ^{2} United We Can results are compared to the combined totals of Yes We Can Llucmajor and Let's Win Llucmajor: Unitary Left in the 2015 election.

=== Manacor ===
Population: 42,631

← Summary of the 26 May 2019 City Council of Manacor election results →
Parties and alliances	Popular vote			Seats	
Parties and alliances	Votes	%	±pp	Total	+/−
More for Manacor–Republican Left–APIB (Més–esquerra–APIB)	3,930	25.62	+3.10	6	+1
Socialist Party of the Balearic Islands (PSIB–PSOE)	2,841	18.52	+4.79	4	+1
People's Party (PP)	2,363	15.40	−3.56	4	±0
Proposal for the Isles (El Pi)	2,264	14.76	−4.75	3	−2
Independent Group of Porto Cristo–S'illoters and Sympathisers (AIPC–SYS)	1,734	11.30	−0.59	3	±0
United We Can (Podemos–EUIB)^{1}	813	5.30	−4.34	1	±0
Vox–Citizen Alternative for Tolerance, Unity and Action (Vox–ACTUA Baleares)	747	4.87	New	0	±0
Citizens–Party of the Citizenry (Cs)	549	3.58	New	0	±0
Blank ballots	126	0.82	−0.98		
Total	15,340			21	±0
Valid votes	15,340	99.37	+0.70		
Invalid votes	98	0.63	−0.70		
Votes cast / turnout	15,438	53.56	−4.05		
Abstentions	13,388	46.44	+4.05		
Registered voters	28,826				
Sources
Footnotes: ^{1} United We Can results are compared to the combined totals of We Want Manacor and Let's Win Manacor: Unitary Left in the 2015 election.

=== Maó-Mahón ===
Population: 28,592

← Summary of the 26 May 2019 City Council of Maó-Mahon election results →
Parties and alliances	Popular vote			Seats	
Parties and alliances	Votes	%	±pp	Total	+/−
People's Party (PP)	4,043	34.08	−1.94	8	±0
Socialist Party of the Balearic Islands (PSIB–PSOE)	3,591	30.27	+4.68	7	+1
Now Maó (aramaó)	2,962	24.97	−2.67	5	−1
Citizens–Party of the Citizenry (Cs)^{1}	705	5.94	+0.30	1	±0
Vox–Citizen Alternative for Tolerance, Unity and Action (Vox–ACTUA Baleares)	309	2.60	New	0	±0
Proposal for the Isles (El Pi)	142	1.20	−1.85	0	±0
Spanish Liberal Project (PLIE)	27	0.23	New	0	±0
Blank ballots	83	0.70	−1.37		
Total	11,862			21	±0
Valid votes	11,862	99.43	+0.74		
Invalid votes	68	0.57	−0.74		
Votes cast / turnout	11,930	56.32	−3.10		
Abstentions	9,252	43.68	+3.10		
Registered voters	21,182				
Sources
Footnotes: ^{1} Citizens–Party of the Citizenry results are compared to Citizens of Menorca totals in the 2015 election.

=== Marratxí ===
Population: 36,725

← Summary of the 26 May 2019 City Council of Marratxí election results →
Parties and alliances	Popular vote			Seats	
Parties and alliances	Votes	%	±pp	Total	+/−
Socialist Party of the Balearic Islands (PSIB–PSOE)	4,061	24.35	+5.61	6	+2
More for Mallorca–APIB (Més–APIB)	3,083	18.49	−2.27	4	−1
People's Party (PP)	3,033	18.19	−16.34	4	−4
Citizens–Party of the Citizenry (Cs)	2,359	14.15	New	3	+3
Vox–Citizen Alternative for Tolerance, Unity and Action (Vox–ACTUA Baleares)	1,814	10.88	New	2	+2
United We Can (Podemos–EUIB)^{1}	1,233	7.39	−4.67	1	−2
Independents of Marratxí–Proposal for the Isles (IdMa–El Pi)	966	5.79	−2.18	1	±0
Blank ballots	126	0.76	−1.69		
Total	16,675			21	±0
Valid votes	16,675	99.17	+0.79		
Invalid votes	139	0.83	−0.79		
Votes cast / turnout	16,814	59.70	−3.34		
Abstentions	11,348	40.30	+3.34		
Registered voters	28,162				
Sources
Footnotes: ^{1} United We Can results are compared to Let's Win Marratxí: Unitary Left totals in the 2015 election.

=== Palma ===
Population: 409,661

← Summary of the 26 May 2019 City Council of Palma election results →
Parties and alliances	Popular vote			Seats	
Parties and alliances	Votes	%	±pp	Total	+/−
Socialist Party of the Balearic Islands (PSIB–PSOE)	38,863	26.49	+7.50	9	+3
People's Party (PP)	27,564	18.79	−7.74	6	−3
Vox–Citizen Alternative for Tolerance, Unity and Action (Vox–ACTUA Baleares)	19,290	13.15	New	4	+4
Citizens–Party of the Citizenry (Cs)	17,941	12.23	+0.51	4	±0
United We Can (Podemos–EUIB)^{1}	15,824	10.79	−8.00	3	−2
More for Palma–We Love Palma (Més–APIB)	15,301	10.43	−5.28	3	−2
Proposal for the Isles (El Pi)	5,389	3.67	−0.02	0	±0
Animalist Party Against Mistreatment of Animals (PACMA)	2,008	1.37	New	0	±0
Call for Palma (Crida per Palma)	1,411	0.96	New	0	±0
We Sum (Sumam)	1,158	0.79	New	0	±0
Act (PACT)	324	0.22	New	0	±0
Spanish Liberal Project (PLIE)	198	0.13	−0.14	0	±0
Seniors in Action (3e en acción)	180	0.12	New	0	±0
With You, We Are Democracy (Contigo)	122	0.08	New	0	±0
Let's Go Now!!! (V Y)	73	0.05	New	0	±0
Blank ballots	1,045	0.71	−1.13		
Total	146,691			29	±0
Valid votes	146,691	99.37	+0.67		
Invalid votes	935	0.63	−0.67		
Votes cast / turnout	147,626	50.24	−4.25		
Abstentions	146,214	49.76	+4.25		
Registered voters	293,840				
Sources
Footnotes: ^{1} United We Can results are compared to the combined totals of We Are Palma and Let's Win Palma: Unitary Left in the 2015 election.

=== Sant Antoni de Portmany ===
Population: 25,779

← Summary of the 26 May 2019 City Council of Sant Antoni de Portmany election results →
Parties and alliances	Popular vote			Seats	
Parties and alliances	Votes	%	±pp	Total	+/−
People's Party (PP)	3,046	36.27	+2.39	9	+1
Socialist Party of the Balearic Islands (PSIB–PSOE)^{1}	2,850	33.94	−11.59	8	−2
United We Can (Podemos–EUIB)	870	10.36	New	2	+2
Proposal for Ibiza (PxE)^{2}	458	5.49	−11.03	1	−2
Citizens–Party of the Citizenry (Cs)	436	5.19	New	1	+1
Vox–Citizen Alternative for Tolerance, Unity and Action (Vox–ACTUA Baleares)	375	4.47	New	0	±0
Now Ibiza–Let's Win the Left–Municipal Agreement (Ara)	142	1.69	New	0	±0
EPIC Ibiza Citizen Movement (MC EPIC)	123	1.46	New	0	±0
Blank ballots	97	1.16	−0.80		
Total	8,397			21	±0
Valid votes	8,397	99.28	+0.34		
Invalid votes	61	0.72	−0.34		
Votes cast / turnout	8,458	49.13	−4.24		
Abstentions	8,756	50.87	+4.24		
Registered voters	17,214				
Sources
Footnotes: ^{1} Socialist Party of the Balearic Islands results are compared to the combined totals of Socialist Party of the Balearic Islands and Restart Sant Antoni in the 2015 election.; ^{2} Proposal for Ibiza results are compared to the combined totals of Proposal for the Isles and More Ibiza–Democratic Corsairs in the 2015 election.

=== Sant Josep de sa Talaia ===
Population: 26,496

← Summary of the 26 May 2019 City Council of Sant Josep de sa Talaia election results →
Parties and alliances	Popular vote			Seats	
Parties and alliances	Votes	%	±pp	Total	+/−
Socialist Party of the Balearic Islands (PSIB–PSOE)	2,931	33.17	+0.50	8	−1
People's Party (PP)	2,002	22.66	−2.33	5	−1
United We Can (Podemos–EUIB)	1,062	12.02	New	3	+3
Citizens–Party of the Citizenry (Cs)	708	8.01	New	2	+2
Now Ibiza–Let's Win the Left–Municipal Agreement (Ara)^{1}	481	5.44	−13.76	1	−3
Vox–Citizen Alternative for Tolerance, Unity and Action (Vox–ACTUA Baleares)	480	5.43	New	1	+1
Proposal for Ibiza (PxE)^{2}	475	5.38	−6.87	1	−1
Commitment to Sant Josep (Compromís amb Sant Josep)	402	4.55	New	0	±0
EPIC Ibiza Citizen Movement (MC EPIC)	198	2.24	−0.57	0	±0
Blank ballots	96	1.09	−1.56		
Total	8,835			21	±0
Valid votes	8,835	98.96	−0.14		
Invalid votes	93	1.04	+0.14		
Votes cast / turnout	8,928	46.49	−0.60		
Abstentions	10,275	53.51	+0.60		
Registered voters	19,203				
Sources
Footnotes: ^{1} Now Ibiza–Let's Win the Left–Municipal Agreement results are compared to the combined totals of Let's Win Sant Josep de sa Talaia and Republican Left–Ibiza Yes–Municipal Agreement in the 2015 election.; ^{2} Proposal for Ibiza results are compared to the combined totals of Island Alternative and More Ibiza–Democratic Corsairs in the 2015 election.

=== Santa Eulària des Riu ===
Population: 36,457

← Summary of the 26 May 2019 City Council of Santa Eulària des Riu election results →
Parties and alliances	Popular vote			Seats	
Parties and alliances	Votes	%	±pp	Total	+/−
People's Party (PP)	5,916	51.57	+3.30	13	+1
Socialist Party of the Balearic Islands (PSIB–PSOE)	2,680	23.36	+1.44	6	+1
United We Can (Podemos–EUIB)	1,248	10.88	New	2	+2
Citizens–Party of the Citizenry (Cs)	559	4.87	New	0	±0
Vox–Citizen Alternative for Tolerance, Unity and Action (Vox–ACTUA Baleares)	381	3.32	New	0	±0
Now Ibiza–Let's Win the Left–Municipal Agreement (Ara)^{1}	327	2.85	−14.93	0	−4
EPIC Ibiza Citizen Movement (MC EPIC)	175	1.53	−1.64	0	±0
Proposal for Ibiza (PxE)^{2}	94	0.82	−3.04	0	±0
Blank ballots	92	0.80	−1.90		
Total	11,472			21	±0
Valid votes	11,472	99.10	+0.70		
Invalid votes	104	0.90	−0.70		
Votes cast / turnout	11,576	48.36	+2.17		
Abstentions	12,360	51.64	−2.17		
Registered voters	23,936				
Sources
Footnotes: ^{1} Now Ibiza–Let's Win the Left–Municipal Agreement results are compared to the combined totals of Let's Win Ibiza and Republican Left–Ibiza Yes–Municipal Agreement in the 2015 election.; ^{2} Proposal for Ibiza results are compared to the combined totals of More Ibiza–Democratic Corsairs and Island Alternative in the 2015 election.

== See also ==
- 2019 Balearic regional election
