= 2019 Balearic island council elections =

Elections in the Spanish region of the Balearic Islands

Island council elections were held in the Balearic Islands on 26 May 2019 to elect the 11th Consells Insulars of Mallorca and Menorca and the 4th Consells Insulars of Formentera and Ibiza. All 76 seats in the four island councils were up for election. They were held concurrently with regional elections in twelve autonomous communities and local elections all across Spain, as well as the 2019 European Parliament election.

== Island control ==
The following table lists party control in the island councils. Gains for a party are highlighted in that party's colour.

Island	Population	Previous control	New control
Formentera	12,216	People for Formentera (GxF)	People for Formentera (GxF)
Ibiza	144,659	Socialist Party of the Balearic Islands (PSIB–PSOE)	People's Party (PP)
Mallorca	880,113	More for Mallorca (Més)	Socialist Party of the Balearic Islands (PSIB–PSOE)
Menorca	91,920	Socialist Party of the Balearic Islands (PSIB–PSOE)	Socialist Party of the Balearic Islands (PSIB–PSOE)

== Islands ==
=== Formentera ===
← Summary of the 26 May 2019 Island Council of Formentera election results →
Parties and alliances	Popular vote			Seats	
Parties and alliances	Votes	%	±pp	Total	+/−
People for Formentera (GxF)	1,398	35.50	−14.25	6	−3
The Union of Formentera (PP–CompromísFormentera) (Sa Unió)^{1}	1,329	33.75	−0.81	6	±0
Socialist Party of the Balearic Islands (PSIB–PSOE)	1,058	26.87	+12.99	5	+3
Vox–Citizen Alternative for Tolerance, Unity and Action (Vox–ACTUA Baleares)	107	2.72	New	0	±0
Blank ballots	46	1.17	−0.64		
Total	3,938			17	±0
Valid votes	3,938	98.55	+1.34		
Invalid votes	58	1.45	−1.34		
Votes cast / turnout	3,996	51.52	±0.00		
Abstentions	3,760	48.48	±0.00		
Registered voters	7,756				
Sources
Footnotes: ^{1} The Union of Formentera results are compared to the combined totals of People's Party and Commitment to Formentera in the 2015 election.

=== Ibiza ===
← Summary of the 26 May 2019 Island Council of Ibiza election results →
Parties and alliances	Popular vote			Seats	
Parties and alliances	Votes	%	±pp	Total	+/−
People's Party (PP)	17,831	39.43	+5.39	6	±0
Socialist Party of the Balearic Islands (PSIB–PSOE)	12,906	28.54	+4.70	4	±0
United We Can (Podemos–EUIB)^{1}	5,429	12.01	−6.85	2	−1
Citizens–Party of the Citizenry (Cs)	3,120	6.90	New	1	+1
Vox–Citizen Alternative for Tolerance, Unity and Action (Vox–ACTUA Baleares)	1,876	4.15	New	0	±0
Now Ibiza–Let's Win the Left (Ara)^{2}	1,373	3.04	+1.27	0	±0
Proposal for Ibiza (PxE)^{3}	1,303	2.88	−5.84	0	±0
EPIC Ibiza Citizen Movement (mcEPIC)	925	2.05	−0.49	0	±0
Blank ballots	456	1.01	−1.46		
Total	45,219			13	±0
Valid votes	45,219	99.05	+0.29		
Invalid votes	436	0.95	−0.29		
Votes cast / turnout	45,655	49.39	+0.09		
Abstentions	46,776	50.61	−0.09		
Registered voters	92,431				
Sources
Footnotes: ^{1} United We Can results are compared to We Can totals in the 2015 election.; ^{2} Now Ibiza–Let's Win the Left results are compared to Republican Left–Ibiza Yes totals in the 2015 election.; ^{3} Proposal for Ibiza results are compared to the combined totals of Proposal for the Isles, More Ibiza–Democratic Corsairs and Island Alternative in the 2015 election.

=== Mallorca ===
← Summary of the 26 May 2019 Island Council of Mallorca election results →
Parties and alliances	Popular vote			Seats	
Parties and alliances	Votes	%	±pp	Total	+/−
Socialist Party of the Balearic Islands (PSIB–PSOE)	89,245	26.52	+8.61	10	+3
People's Party (PP)	69,286	20.59	−7.24	7	−3
More for Mallorca (Més)	42,692	12.69	−4.64	4	−2
Citizens–Party of the Citizenry (Cs)	34,696	10.31	+3.02	3	+1
United We Can (Podemos–EUIB)^{1}	31,986	9.51	−6.58	3	−2
El Pi–Proposal for the Isles (El Pi)	30,746	9.14	−0.21	3	±0
Vox–Citizen Alternative for Tolerance, Unity and Action (Vox–ACTUA Baleares)	30,592	9.09	New	3	+3
Act (PACT)	912	0.27	New	0	±0
Independent Social Group (ASI)	869	0.26	−0.04	0	±0
Four Islands Movement (M4illes)	770	0.23	New	0	±0
Spanish Liberal Project (PLIE)	422	0.13	−0.06	0	±0
Spanish Phalanx of the CSNO (FE–JONS)	331	0.10	New	0	±0
Blank ballots	3,911	1.16	−0.70		
Total	336,458			33	±0
Valid votes	336,458	98.79	+0.20		
Invalid votes	4,121	1.21	−0.20		
Votes cast / turnout	340,579	56.18	−3.98		
Abstentions	265,677	43.82	+3.98		
Registered voters	606,256				
Sources
Footnotes: ^{1} United We Can results are compared to the combined totals of We Can and Let's Win the Balearic Islands in the 2015 election.

=== Menorca ===
← Summary of the 26 May 2019 Island Council of Menorca election results →
Parties and alliances	Popular vote			Seats	
Parties and alliances	Votes	%	±pp	Total	+/−
People's Party (PP)	11,176	28.64	−3.13	4	−1
Socialist Party of the Balearic Islands (PSIB–PSOE)	10,410	26.68	+4.14	4	+1
More for Menorca (MxMe)	6,953	17.82	−0.92	3	±0
United We Can (Podemos–EUIB)^{1}	4,307	11.04	−5.58	1	−1
Citizens–Party of the Citizenry (Cs)^{2}	3,357	8.60	+3.62	1	+1
El Pi–Proposal for the Isles (El Pi)	1,062	2.72	−0.32	0	±0
Vox–Citizen Alternative for Tolerance, Unity and Action (Vox–ACTUA Baleares)	1,053	2.70	New	0	±0
Act (PACT)	165	0.42	New	0	±0
Spanish Liberal Project (PLIE)	58	0.15	New	0	±0
Blank ballots	484	1.24	−1.07		
Total	39,025			13	±0
Valid votes	39,025	98.97	+0.57		
Invalid votes	407	1.03	−0.57		
Votes cast / turnout	39,432	58.02	−0.36		
Abstentions	28,525	41.98	+0.36		
Registered voters	67,957				
Sources
Footnotes: ^{1} United We Can results are compared to the combined totals of We Can and Left of Menorca–United Left in the 2015 election.; ^{2} Citizens–Party of the Citizenry results are compared to Citizens of Menorca–Ciutadella de Menorca People's Union totals in the 2015 election.

== See also ==
- 2019 Balearic regional election
