= 2023 Spanish local elections in the Balearic Islands =

This article presents the results breakdown of the local elections held in the Balearic Islands on 28 May 2023. The following tables show detailed results in the autonomous community's most populous municipalities, sorted alphabetically.

== City control ==
The following table lists party control in the most populous municipalities, including provincial capitals (shown in bold). Gains for a party are displayed with the cell's background shaded in that party's colour.

Municipality	Population	Previous control	New control
Calvià	52,458	Socialist Party of the Balearic Islands (PSIB–PSOE)	People's Party of the Balearic Islands (PP)
Ciutadella de Menorca	30,811	Socialist Party of Menorca–More for Menorca (PSM–MxM)	People's Party of the Balearic Islands (PP) (PSIB–PSOE in 2024)
Ibiza	50,715	Socialist Party of the Balearic Islands (PSIB–PSOE)	People's Party of the Balearic Islands (PP)
Inca	34,093	Socialist Party of the Balearic Islands (PSIB–PSOE)	Socialist Party of the Balearic Islands (PSIB–PSOE)
Llucmajor	38,722	People's Party (PP)	People's Party (PP)
Manacor	45,352	More for Mallorca (Més)	More for Mallorca (Més)
Maó	29,445	Socialist Party of the Balearic Islands (PSIB–PSOE)	Socialist Party of the Balearic Islands (PSIB–PSOE)
Marratxí	38,902	Socialist Party of the Balearic Islands (PSIB–PSOE)	People's Party (PP)
**Palma**	415,940	Socialist Party of the Balearic Islands (PSIB–PSOE)	People's Party (PP)
Sant Antoni de Portmany	27,431	People's Party (PP)	People's Party (PP)
Sant Josep de sa Talaia	28,831	Socialist Party of the Balearic Islands (PSIB–PSOE)	People's Party (PP)
Santa Eulària des Riu	40,548	People's Party (PP)	People's Party (PP)

== Municipalities ==
=== Calvià ===
Population: 52,458

← Summary of the 28 May 2023 City Council of Calvià election results →
Parties and alliances	Popular vote			Seats	
Parties and alliances	Votes	%	±pp	Total	+/−
Socialist Party of the Balearic Islands (PSIB–PSOE)	6,612	38.03	−2.96	12	+2
People's Party (PP)	4,932	28.37	+6.23	8	+3
Vox (Vox)	2,859	16.45	+6.05	5	+3
More Left of Calvià (Més–Decide)^{1}	707	4.07	n/a	0	−1
United We Can (EUIB–Podemos)^{1}	617	3.55	n/a	0	−1
Alliance for Calvià (AxCalviá)	562	3.23	New	0	±0
Proposal for the Isles (El Pi)	361	2.08	−0.53	0	±0
Neighbourhood Party of Calvià (Vecinos Calviá)	360	2.07	New	0	±0
Citizens–Party of the Citizenry (Cs)	149	0.86	−8.04	0	−2
Blank ballots	225	1.29	+0.72		
Total	17,384			25	+4
Valid votes	17,384	99.12	−0.26		
Invalid votes	155	0.88	+0.26		
Votes cast / turnout	17,539	55.59	+5.01		
Abstentions	14,010	44.41	−5.01		
Registered voters	31,549				
Sources
Footnotes: ^{1} Within the We Can–More alliance in the 2019 election.

=== Ciutadella de Menorca ===
Population: 30,811

← Summary of the 28 May 2023 City Council of Ciutadella de Menorca election results →
Parties and alliances	Popular vote			Seats	
Parties and alliances	Votes	%	±pp	Total	+/−
People's Party (PP)	4,142	36.01	13.96	9	+4
Socialist Party of the Balearic Islands (PSIB–PSOE)	2,650	23.04	+5.08	5	+1
Socialist Party of Menorca–More for Menorca (PSM–MxM)	2,485	21.61	−6.79	5	−2
Ciutadella Forward (Ciutadella Endavant)^{1}	844	7.34	−2.73	1	−1
Vox (Vox)	736	6.40	+3.78	1	+1
Citizens–Party of the Citizenry (Cs)	348	3.03	−10.32	0	−3
Spanish Liberal Project (PLIE)	80	0.70	+0.52	0	±0
Blank ballots	216	1.88	+0.60		
Total	11,501			21	±0
Valid votes	11,501	98.33	−0.88		
Invalid votes	195	1.67	+0.88		
Votes cast / turnout	11,696	49.48	−4.17		
Abstentions	11,943	50.52	+4.17		
Registered voters	23,639				
Sources
Footnotes: ^{1} Ciutadella Forward results are compared to United We Can–People for Ciutadella totals in the 2019 election.

=== Ibiza ===
Population: 50,715

← Summary of the 28 May 2023 City Council of Ibiza election results →
Parties and alliances	Popular vote			Seats	
Parties and alliances	Votes	%	±pp	Total	+/−
People's Party (PP)	7,448	47.55	+18.30	15	+7
Socialist Party of the Balearic Islands (PSIB–PSOE)	3,879	24.77	−7.89	7	−2
Vox (Vox)	1,375	8.78	+4.27	2	+2
United We Can (EUIB–Podemos)	858	5.48	−4.83	1	−1
Now Ibiza–Municipal Agreement (Ara Eivissa–AM)	657	4.19	+0.46	0	±0
EPIC Ibiza Citizen Movement–El Pi (EPIC–El Pi)^{1}	576	3.68	−5.25	0	±0
For the Balearics (PerxB)	347	2.22	New	0	±0
Citizens–Party of the Citizenry (Cs)	255	1.63	−7.84	0	−2
Blank ballots	267	1.70	+0.59		
Total	15,662			25	+4
Valid votes	15,662	98.58	−0.53		
Invalid votes	225	1.42	+0.53		
Votes cast / turnout	15,887	48.29	+0.58		
Abstentions	17,010	51.71	−0.58		
Registered voters	32,897				
Sources
Footnotes: ^{1} EPIC Ibiza Citizen Movement–El Pi results are compared to the combined totals of EPIC Ibiza Citizen Movement and Proposal for Ibiza in the 2019 election.

=== Inca ===
Population: 34,093

← Summary of the 28 May 2023 City Council of Inca election results →
Parties and alliances	Popular vote			Seats	
Parties and alliances	Votes	%	±pp	Total	+/−
Socialist Party of the Balearic Islands (PSIB–PSOE)	5,214	38.85	−0.56	10	+1
People's Party (PP)	3,042	22.66	+7.67	6	+3
Vox (Vox)	1,998	14.89	+6.96	3	+1
More for Mallorca (Més)	1,025	7.64	−0.98	2	±0
Independents of Inca (INDI)	646	4.81	−4.18	0	−2
Proposal for the Isles (El Pi)	385	2.87	−4.38	0	−1
Citizens–Party of the Citizenry (Cs)	369	2.75	−3.73	0	−1
For the Balearics (PerxB)	313	2.33	New	0	±0
United We Can (EUIB–Podemos)	300	2.24	−2.95	0	−1
Blank ballots	130	0.97	+0.25		
Total	13,422			21	±0
Valid votes	13,422	99.00	−0.31		
Invalid votes	135	1.00	+0.31		
Votes cast / turnout	13,557	59.39	+3.15		
Abstentions	9,269	40.61	−3.15		
Registered voters	22,826				

=== Llucmajor ===
Population: 38,722

← Summary of the 28 May 2023 City Council of Llucmajor election results →
Parties and alliances	Popular vote			Seats	
Parties and alliances	Votes	%	±pp	Total	+/−
People's Party (PP)	3,891	26.13	+5.14	7	+2
Socialist Party of the Balearic Islands (PSIB–PSOE)	2,574	17.28	−3.91	4	−1
Vox (Vox)	2,186	14.68	+5.57	3	+1
Freedom Llucmajor (Llibertat Llucmajor)	1,647	11.06	+2.56	2	±0
More for Mallorca (Més)	1,520	10.21	−0.05	2	±0
S'Arenal–Urbanisations–Llucmajor (S'ULL)	1,116	7.49	New	2	+2
Independent Social Group (ASI)	797	5.35	−1.07	1	±0
Proposal for the Isles (El Pi)	444	2.98	−3.00	0	−1
United We Can (EUIB–Podemos)	386	2.59	−3.68	0	−1
Spanish Phalanx of the CNSO (FE de las JONS)	62	0.42	New	0	±0
Spanish Liberal Project (PLIE)	57	0.38	+0.25	0	±0
Citizens–Party of the Citizenry (Cs)	n/a	n/a	−9.59	n/a	−2
Blank ballots	213	1.43	+0.44		
Total	14,893			21	±0
Valid votes	14,893	99.04	−0.34		
Invalid votes	145	0.96	+0.34		
Votes cast / turnout	15,038	56.22	+3.81		
Abstentions	11,709	43.78	−3.81		
Registered voters	26,747				

=== Manacor ===
Population: 45,352

← Summary of the 28 May 2023 City Council of Manacor election results →
Parties and alliances	Popular vote			Seats	
Parties and alliances	Votes	%	±pp	Total	+/−
More for Mallorca (Més)	4,566	28.00	+2.38	7	+1
People's Party (PP)	4,160	25.51	+10.11	6	+2
Socialist Party of the Balearic Islands (PSIB–PSOE)	2,983	18.30	−0.22	4	±0
Independent Group of Porto Cristo–S'illoters and Sympathisers (AIPC–SYS)	1,884	11.55	+0.25	2	−1
Vox (Vox)	1,292	7.92	+3.05	2	+2
Proposal for the Isles (El Pi)	733	4.50	−10.26	0	−3
United We Can (EUIB–Podemos)	320	1.96	−3.34	0	−1
New National Order (Orden)	194	1.19	New	0	±0
Blank ballots	173	1.06	+0.24		
Total	16,305			21	±0
Valid votes	16,305	99.01	−0.36		
Invalid votes	163	0.99	+0.36		
Votes cast / turnout	16,468	55.34	+1.78		
Abstentions	13,291	44.66	−1.78		
Registered voters	29,759				

=== Maó ===
Population: 29,445

← Summary of the 28 May 2023 City Council of Maó election results →
Parties and alliances	Popular vote			Seats	
Parties and alliances	Votes	%	±pp	Total	+/−
Socialist Party of the Balearic Islands (PSIB–PSOE)	4,277	36.56	+6.27	8	+1
People's Party (PP)	4,188	35.80	+1.72	8	±0
Now Maó (aramaó)	2,061	17.62	−7.35	4	−1
Vox (Vox)	771	6.59	+3.99	1	+1
Citizens–Party of the Citizenry (Cs)	197	1.68	−4.26	0	−1
Blank ballots	203	1.74	+1.04		
Total	11,697			21	±0
Valid votes	11,697	98.63	−0.80		
Invalid votes	162	1.37	+0.80		
Votes cast / turnout	11,859	54.60	−1.72		
Abstentions	9,859	45.40	+1.72		
Registered voters	21,718				

=== Marratxí ===
Population: 38,902

← Summary of the 28 May 2023 City Council of Marratxí election results →
Parties and alliances	Popular vote			Seats	
Parties and alliances	Votes	%	±pp	Total	+/−
People's Party (PP)	6,480	34.02	+15.83	8	+4
Socialist Party of the Balearic Islands (PSIB–PSOE)	5,175	27.17	+2.82	7	+1
Vox (Vox)	3,430	18.01	+7.13	4	+2
More for Mallorca (Més)	1,937	10.17	−8.32	2	−2
Proposal for the Isles (El Pi)^{1}	888	4.66	−1.13	0	−1
United We Can (EUIB–Podemos)	503	2.64	−4.75	0	−1
Citizens–Party of the Citizenry (Cs)	354	1.86	−12.29	0	−3
Blank ballots	281	1.48	+0.72		
Total	19,048			21	±0
Valid votes	19,048	98.95	−0.22		
Invalid votes	203	1.05	+0.22		
Votes cast / turnout	19,251	64.21	+4.51		
Abstentions	10,729	35.79	−4.51		
Registered voters	29,980				
Sources
Footnotes: ^{1} Proposal for the Isles results are compared to Independents of Marratxí–Proposal for the Isles totals in the 2019 election.

=== Palma ===
Population: 415,940

← Summary of the 28 May 2023 City Council of Palma election results →
Parties and alliances	Popular vote			Seats	
Parties and alliances	Votes	%	±pp	Total	+/−
People's Party (PP)	51,228	32.19	+13.40	11	+5
Socialist Party of the Balearic Islands (PSIB–PSOE)	39,585	24.87	−1.62	8	−1
Vox (Vox)	32,586	20.47	+7.32	6	+2
More for Mallorca (Més)	14,865	9.34	−1.09	3	±0
United We Can (EUIB–Podemos)	8,127	5.11	−5.68	1	−2
Proposal for the Isles (El Pi)	3,647	2.29	−1.38	0	±0
Citizens–Party of the Citizenry (Cs)	2,969	1.87	−10.36	0	−4
Progress in Green–PACMA (Progreso en Verde–PACMA)^{1}	1,938	1.22	−0.15	0	±0
CUP–Call for Palma–Municipalist Alternative (CUP–CxP–AMunt)^{2}	901	0.57	−0.39	0	±0
Coalition for the Balearics (CperB)	518	0.33	New	0	±0
Spanish Liberal Project (PLIE)	296	0.19	+0.06	0	±0
Political Reset (Reset)	213	0.13	New	0	±0
Blank ballots	2,292	1.44	+0.73		
Total	159,165			29	±0
Valid votes	159,165	98.89	−0.48		
Invalid votes	1,784	1.11	+0.48		
Votes cast / turnout	160,949	54.52	+4.28		
Abstentions	134,346	45.48	−4.28		
Registered voters	295,395				
Sources
Footnotes: ^{1} Progress in Green–PACMA results are compared to Animalist Party Against Mistreatment of Animals totals in the 2019 election.; ^{2} CUP–Call for Palma–Municipalist Alternative results are compared to Call per Palma totals in the 2019 election.

=== Sant Antoni de Portmany ===
Population: 27,431

← Summary of the 28 May 2023 City Council of Sant Antoni de Portmany election results →
Parties and alliances	Popular vote			Seats	
Parties and alliances	Votes	%	±pp	Total	+/−
People's Party (PP)	4,168	51.11	+14.84	12	+3
Socialist Party of the Balearic Islands (PSIB–PSOE)^{1}	2,307	28.29	−5.65	7	−1
Vox–Citizen Alternative for Tolerance, Unity and Action (Vox–ACTUA Baleares)	647	7.93	+3.46	1	+1
United We Can (EUIB–Podemos)	585	7.17	−3.19	1	−1
Proposal for the Isles (El Pi)^{1}	304	3.73	−3.22	0	−1
Citizens–Party of the Citizenry (Cs)	n/a	n/a	−5.19	n/a	−1
Blank ballots	144	1.77	+0.61		
Total	8,155			21	±0
Valid votes	8,155	98.68	−0.60		
Invalid votes	109	1.32	+0.60		
Votes cast / turnout	8,264	46.58	−2.55		
Abstentions	9,479	53.42	+2.55		
Registered voters	17,743				
Sources
Footnotes: ^{1} Proposal for the Isles results are compared to the combined totals of Proposal for Ibiza and EPIC Ibiza Citizen Movement in the 2019 election.

=== Sant Josep de sa Talaia ===
Population: 28,831

← Summary of the 28 May 2023 City Council of Sant Josep de sa Talaia election results →
Parties and alliances	Popular vote			Seats	
Parties and alliances	Votes	%	±pp	Total	+/−
People's Party (PP)^{1}	3,816	44.78	+16.74	10	+4
Socialist Party of the Balearic Islands (PSIB–PSOE)	2,524	29.62	−3.55	7	−1
Vox (Vox)	730	8.57	+3.14	2	+1
Now Ibiza–Municipal Agreement (Ara)	562	6.59	+1.15	1	±0
United We Can (EUIB–Podemos)	554	6.50	−5.52	1	−2
For the Balearics (PerxB)^{2}	173	2.03	−2.52	0	±0
Citizens–Party of the Citizenry (Cs)	n/a	n/a	−8.01	n/a	−2
Blank ballots	163	1.91	+0.82		
Total	8,522			21	±0
Valid votes	8,522	98.77	−0.19		
Invalid votes	106	1.23	+0.19		
Votes cast / turnout	8,628	43.71	−2.78		
Abstentions	11,110	56.29	+2.78		
Registered voters	19,738				
Sources
Footnotes: ^{2} People's Party results are compared to the combined totals of People's Party and Proposal for Ibiza in the 2019 election.; ^{2} For the Balearics results are compared to Commitment to Sant Josep totals in the 2019 election.

=== Santa Eulària des Riu ===
Population: 40,548

← Summary of the 28 May 2023 City Council of Santa Eulària des Riu election results →
Parties and alliances	Popular vote			Seats	
Parties and alliances	Votes	%	±pp	Total	+/−
People's Party (PP)	6,737	62.16	+10.59	14	+1
Socialist Party of the Balearic Islands (PSIB–PSOE)	2,336	21.55	−1.81	5	−1
United We Can (EUIB–Podemos)	819	7.56	−3.32	1	−1
Vox (Vox)	771	7.11	+3.79	1	+1
Blank ballots	175	1.61	+0.81		
Total	10,838			21	±0
Valid votes	10,838	98.44	−0.66		
Invalid votes	172	1.56	+0.66		
Votes cast / turnout	11,010	44.12	−4.24		
Abstentions	13,945	55.88	+4.24		
Registered voters	24,955				

== See also ==
- 2023 Balearic regional election
