= 2015 Balearic island council elections =

Elections in the Spanish region of the Balearic Islands

Island council elections were held in the Balearic Islands on 24 May 2015 to elect the 10th Consells Insulars of Mallorca and Menorca and the 3rd Consells Insulars of Formentera and Ibiza. All 76 seats in the four island councils were up for election. They were held concurrently with regional elections in thirteen autonomous communities and local elections all across Spain.

== Island control ==
The following table lists party control in the island councils. Gains for a party are highlighted in that party's colour.

Island	Population	Previous control	New control
Formentera	11,545	People for Formentera (GxF)	People for Formentera (GxF)
Ibiza	140,271	People's Party (PP)	Socialist Party of the Balearic Islands (PSIB–PSOE)
Mallorca	858,313	People's Party (PP)	More for Mallorca (Més)
Menorca	93,313	People's Party (PP)	More for Menorca (MpM) (PSIB–PSOE in 2017)

== Islands ==
=== Formentera ===
← Summary of the 24 May 2015 Island Council of Formentera election results →
Parties and alliances	Popular vote			Seats	
Parties and alliances	Votes	%	±pp	Total	+/−
People for Formentera (GxF)	1,817	49.75	+5.71	9	+3
People's Party (PP)^{1}	802	21.96	n/a	4	+1
Socialist Party of the Balearic Islands (PSIB–PSOE)	507	13.88	−1.41	2	±0
Commitment to Formentera (CompromísFormentera)^{1}	460	12.60	n/a	2	±0
Blank ballots	66	1.81	−0.18		
Total	3,652			17	+4
Valid votes	3,652	97.21	−0.99		
Invalid votes	105	2.79	+0.99		
Votes cast / turnout	3,757	51.52	−9.34		
Abstentions	3,535	48.48	+9.34		
Registered voters	7,292				
Sources
Footnotes: ^{1} Within the Union of Formentera coalition in the 2011 election.

=== Ibiza ===
← Summary of the 24 May 2015 Island Council of Ibiza election results →
Parties and alliances	Popular vote			Seats	
Parties and alliances	Votes	%	±pp	Total	+/−
People's Party (PP)	14,782	34.04	−17.34	6	−2
Socialist Party of the Balearic Islands (PSIB–PSOE)^{1}	10,354	23.84	n/a	4	±0
We Can (Podemos/Podem)	8,188	18.86	New	3	+3
People for Ibiza (GxE)^{1}	2,193	5.05	n/a	0	−1
El Pi–Proposal for the Isles (El Pi)	2,006	4.62	New	0	±0
EPIC Ibiza Citizen Movement (mcEPIC)	1,102	2.54	New	0	±0
More Ibiza–Democratic Corsairs (MEC)	1,002	2.31	New	0	±0
Island Alternative (AL–in)^{2}	777	1.79	−2.68	0	±0
Republican Left–Ibiza Yes (ER–Eivissa Sí)^{1}	769	1.77	n/a	0	±0
Union, Progress and Democracy (UPyD)	696	1.60	−0.50	0	±0
Renewal Party of Ibiza and Formentera (PREF)	486	1.12	New	0	±0
Blank ballots	1,070	2.46	−0.86		
Total	43,425			13	±0
Valid votes	43,425	98.76	+0.34		
Invalid votes	545	1.24	−0.34		
Votes cast / turnout	43,970	49.30	−2.85		
Abstentions	45,222	50.70	+2.85		
Registered voters	89,192				
Sources
Footnotes: ^{1} Within the PSOE–Pact for Ibiza coalition in the 2011 election.; ^{2} Island Alternative results are compared to New Alternative totals in the 2011 election.

=== Mallorca ===
← Summary of the 24 May 2015 Island Council of Mallorca election results →
Parties and alliances	Popular vote			Seats	
Parties and alliances	Votes	%	±pp	Total	+/−
People's Party (PP)	96,314	27.83	−18.25	10	−9
Socialist Party of the Balearic Islands (PSIB–PSOE)	62,018	17.91	−5.65	7	−3
More for Mallorca–PSM–Agreement–Initiative Greens (Més–PSM–Entesa–IV)^{1}	59,992	17.33	+6.76	6	+2
We Can (Podemos/Podem)	49,652	14.34	New	5	+5
El Pi–Proposal for the Isles (El Pi)^{2}	32,387	9.35	+1.83	3	+3
Citizens–Party of the Citizenry (C's)	25,236	7.29	+7.04	2	+2
Let's Win the Balearic Islands (Guanyem)^{3}	6,091	1.75	−1.18	0	±0
Union, Progress and Democracy (UPyD)	3,131	0.90	−1.29	0	±0
Independent Green Ecologists of the Balearics (ECOVIB)	2,185	0.63	New	0	±0
Independent Social Group (ASI)	1,060	0.30	−0.02	0	±0
Family and Life Party (PFyV)	955	0.27	+0.12	0	±0
Spanish Liberal Project (PLIE)	677	0.19	+0.02	0	±0
Blank ballots	6,440	1.86	−1.00		
Total	346,138			33	±0
Valid votes	346,138	98.59	+0.19		
Invalid votes	4,928	1.41	−0.19		
Votes cast / turnout	351,082	60.16	−0.81		
Abstentions	232,480	39.84	+0.81		
Registered voters	583,562				
Sources
Footnotes: ^{1} More for Majorca–PSM–Agreement–Initiative Greens results are compared to Socialist Party of Mallorca–Initiative Greens–Agreement totals in the 2011 election.; ^{2} El Pi–Proposal for the Isles results are compared to the combined totals of Regionalist League of the Balearic Islands and Convergence for the Isles in the 2011 election.; ^{3} Let's Win the Balearic Islands results are compared to United Left of the Balearic Islands totals in the 2011 election.

=== Menorca ===
← Summary of the 24 May 2015 Island Council of Menorca election results →
Parties and alliances	Popular vote			Seats	
Parties and alliances	Votes	%	±pp	Total	+/−
People's Party (PP)	11,928	31.77	−15.05	5	−3
Socialist Party of the Balearic Islands (PSIB–PSOE)	8,462	22.54	−3.17	3	−1
More for Menorca (MpM)^{1}	7,038	18.74	+5.78	3	+2
We Can (Podemos/Podem)	4,681	12.47	New	2	+2
Citizens of Menorca–Ciutadella de Menorca People's Union (CMe–UPCM)	1,869	4.98	+3.75	0	±0
Left of Menorca–United Left (EM–EU)	1,560	4.15	−0.06	0	±0
El Pi–Proposal for the Isles (El Pi)^{2}	1,141	3.04	+0.23	0	±0
Blank ballots	868	2.31	−0.66		
Total	37,547			13	±0
Valid votes	37,547	98.40	+0.04		
Invalid votes	610	1.60	−0.04		
Votes cast / turnout	38,155	58.38	−1.81		
Abstentions	27,199	41.62	+1.81		
Registered voters	65,356				
Sources
Footnotes: ^{1} More for Menorca results are compared to the combined totals of Socialist Party of Menorca–Nationalist Agreement and The Greens of Menorca in the 2011 election.; ^{2} El Pi–Proposal for the Isles results are compared to Menorcan Union totals in the 2011 election.

== See also ==
- 2015 Balearic regional election
