= Jorge Campos (disambiguation) =

Jorge Campos (born 1966) is a Mexican football goalkeeper

Jorge Campos may also refer to:

- Jorge Campos (Paraguayan footballer) (born 1970), Paraguayan football attacking midfielder
- Jorge Campos (footballer, born 1979), Mexican football midfielder and manager
- Jorge Campos (table tennis) (born 1991), Cuban table tennis player
- Jorge Campos Asensi (born 1975), Spanish politician
