= Gent per Formentera =

- Founded: 2007
- Ideology: Environmentalism; Democratic socialism Catalan nationalism
- Political position: Left-wing
- Parliament of the Balearic Islands (Formentera seats): 0 / 1
- Island Council of Formentera: 5 / 17

Website
- www.gentxformentera.cat

Gent per Formentera (English: People for Formentera, GxF), is a political grouping of the island of Formentera that appeared in 2007 to contest the elections to the Island Council of Formentera and the elections to the Parliament of the Balearic Islands (in coalition with PSIB). They describe themselves as a left-wing, environmentalist and nationalist party dedicated to fulfilling the specific needs of the island.

== History ==
In the 2007 Island Council elections, GxF was the most voted party, obtaining five councilors. This result, along with a post-election pact with the two councilors of the PSIB, resulted in the GxF leader Jaume Ferrer Ribas becoming president of the newly formed Island Council of Formentera. In the 2011 election, GxF obtained six island councilors, returning the incumbent insular government to power. The group also won the regional deputy of the island of Formentera for the Parliament of the Balearic Islands. In 2015, GxF won the election in the Island Council by absolute majority and retained its sole representative in the regional Parliament.

== Electoral performance ==
=== Parliament of the Balearic Islands ===
Date	Votes			Seats		Status	Size	Notes
Date	#	%	±pp	#	±	Status	Size	Notes
2007	1,456	0.4%	+0.1	0 / 59	0	N/A	*	
2011	1,904	0.5%	+0.1	1 / 59	1	Opposition	*	
2015	2,006	0.5%	±0.0	1 / 59	0	Opposition	*	government support
2019	2,036	0.5%	±0.0	1 / 59	0	Opposition	**	government support
2023	1,679	0.4%	–0.1	0 / 59	1	N/A	*	

- * Within People for Formentera+PSOE
- ** Within People for Formentera+PSOE+EUIB

=== Island Council of Formentera ===
Date	Votes			Seats		Status	Size
Date	#	%	±pp	#	±	Status	Size
2007	1,134	32.8%	–	5 / 13	–	Government	1st
2011	1,662	44.0%	+11.2	6 / 13	1	Government	1st
2015	1,817	49.8%	+5.8	9 / 17	3	Government	1st
2019	1,398	35.5%	–14.3	6 / 17	3	Government	1st
2023	1,030	26.0%	–9.5	5 / 17	1	Opposition	2nd
