= 2019 Balearic regional election =

Election in the Spanish region of the Balearic Islands

- 26 May 2019

All 59 seats in the Parliament of the Balearic Islands 30 seats needed for a majority
- Opinion polls
- Registered: 801,618 ▲4.6%
- Turnout: 432,279 (53.9%) ▼3.2 pp
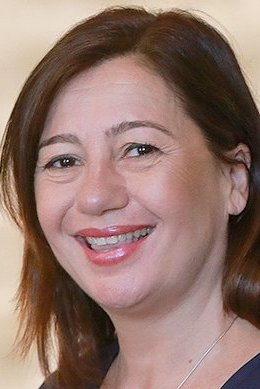

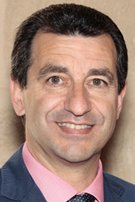

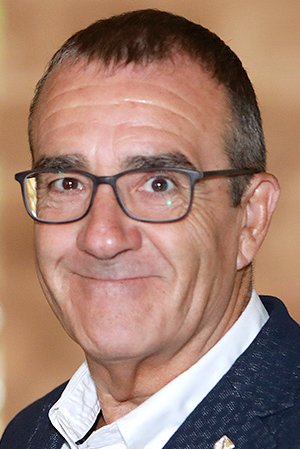

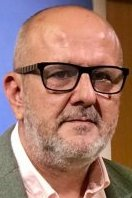

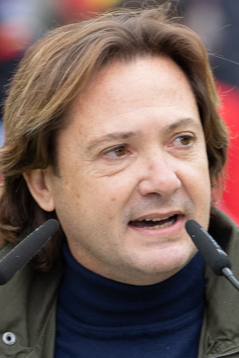

| | First party | Second party | Third party |
|---|---|---|---|
| Leader | Francina Armengol | Biel Company | Juan Pedro Yllanes |
| Party | PSIB–PSOE | PP | Podemos–EUIB |
| Leader since | 25 February 2012 | 26 March 2017 | 27 November 2018 |
| Leader's seat | Mallorca | Mallorca | Mallorca |
| Last election | 14 seats, 18.9% | 20 seats, 28.3% (Note: Results for PP in the 2015 election, not including Formentera.) | 10 seats, 16.4% (Note: Results for Podemos (14.7%, 10 seats) and Guanyem (1.7%, 0 seats)—not including Ibiza—in the 2015 election.) |
| Seats won | 19 | 16 | 6 |
| Seat change | ▲5 | ▼4 | ▼4 |
| Popular vote | 117,480 | 95,295 | 41,824 |
| Percentage | 27.4% | 22.2% | 9.7% |
| Swing | ▲8.5 pp | ▼6.1 pp | ▼6.7 pp |
| | Fourth party | Fifth party | Sixth party |
| Leader | Marc Pérez-Ribas | Miquel Ensenyat | Jorge Campos |
| Party | Cs | Més | Vox |
| Leader since | 9 March 2019 | 9 June 2018 | 1 April 2019 |
| Leader's seat | Mallorca | Mallorca | Mallorca |
| Last election | 2 seats, 6.4% (Note: Results for C's (5.9%, 2 seats) and CMe–UPCM (0.4%, 0 seats) in the 2015 election.) | 6 seats, 13.8% | Did not contest |
| Seats won | 5 | 4 | 3 |
| Seat change | ▲3 | ▼2 | ▲3 |
| Popular vote | 42,519 | 39,415 | 34,871 |
| Percentage | 9.9% | 9.2% | 8.1% |
| Swing | ▲3.5 pp | ▼4.6 pp | New party |
| | Seventh party | Eighth party | Ninth party |
| Leader | Jaume Font | Josep Castells | Sílvia Tur |
| Party | El Pi | MxMe | GxF+PSOE+EUIB |
| Leader since | 2 November 2012 | 16 December 2018 | 10 April 2015 |
| Leader's seat | Mallorca | Menorca | Formentera |
| Last election | 3 seats, 7.4% (Note: Results for El Pi in the 2015 election, not including Ibiza.) | 3 seats, 1.5% | 1 seat, 0.5% |
| Seats won | 3 | 2 | 1 |
| Seat change | 0 | ▼1 | 0 |
| Popular vote | 31,348 | 6,058 | 2,036 |
| Percentage | 7.3% | 1.4% | 0.5% |
| Swing | ▼0.1 pp | ▼0.1 pp | 0.0 pp |
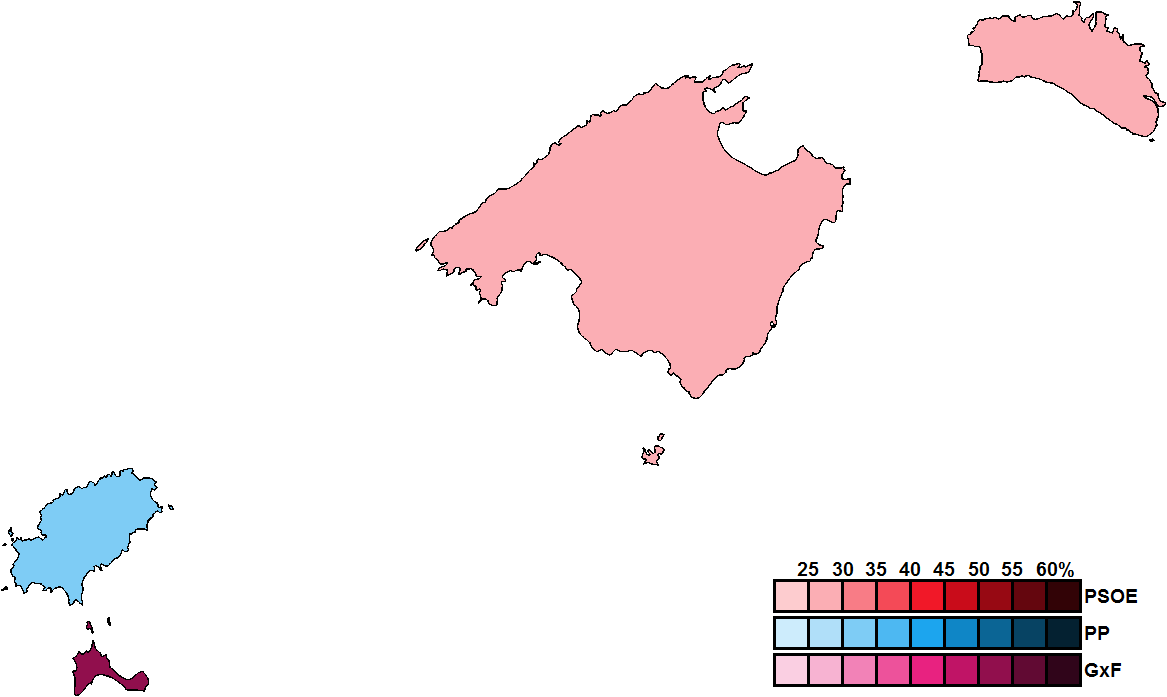
- Constituency results map for the Parliament of the Balearic Islands
President before election
Francina Armengol
PSOE
President after election
Francina Armengol
PSOE

A regional election was held in the Balearic Islands on 26 May 2019 to elect the 10th Parliament of the autonomous community. All 59 seats in the Parliament were up for election. It was held concurrently with regional elections in eleven other autonomous communities and local elections all across Spain, as well as the 2019 European Parliament election.

== Background ==
The previous election saw a left-wing majority in the Parliament of the Balearic Islands for the first time. After the election, on 30 June 2015, Francina Armengol was elected president, forming a government with the Socialist Party of the Balearic Islands (PSIB), More for Mallorca (Més) and More for Menorca (MpM), with the external support of We Can (Podemos) and the representative of People for Formentera (GxF). Xelo Huertas, of Podem, took office as the Parliament's speaker, the second authority of the region.

In November 2016, Podemos decided to cease two party deputies, including Huertas, for trying to benefit another party member's personal interests. On 25 January 2017, Huertas resigned as Speaker, although she continued in the Mixed Group as an independent deputy, along with Montse Seijas, the other expelled Podemos deputy. The parties of the pact, with some disputes, agreed to vote for Podemos deputy Baltasar Picornell to become new Speaker on 14 February 2017.

In March 2017, a fraudulent contract to the campaign manager of Més made by the regional vice president, Gabriel Barceló, appeared in the media. This fact created a crisis in the Government and ended up with the resignation of transparency minister Ruth Mateu and the withdrawal of her party, MpM, from the government, although remaining as an outer supporter.

In June 2017, the People's Party (PP) member Álvaro Gijón resigned from the party but continued as a deputy in the Mixed Group. The cause was a fraudulent contract for a municipal company in Palma made by the time Gijón was deputy mayor, also involving part of his family.

In December 2017, Barceló was accused of accepting a personal travel as a gift. This fact, along with controversies and internal disputes since March, made him resign as regional vice president and tourism minister. Barceló was relieved by Bel Busquets, of Més.

== Overview ==
Under the 2007 Statute of Autonomy, the Parliament of the Balearic Islands was the unicameral legislature of the homonymous autonomous community, having legislative power in devolved matters, as well as the ability to grant or withdraw confidence from a regional president. The electoral and procedural rules were supplemented by national law provisions.

=== Date ===
The term of the Parliament of the Balearic Islands expired four years after the date of its previous election, unless it was dissolved earlier. The election decree was required to be issued no later than 25 days before the scheduled expiration date of parliament and published on the following day in the Official Gazette of the Balearic Islands (BOIB), with election day taking place 54 days after the decree's publication. The previous election was held on 24 May 2015, which meant that the chamber's term would have expired on 24 May 2019. The election decree was required to be published in the BOIB no later than 30 April 2019, setting the latest possible date for election day on 23 June 2019.

The regional president had the prerogative to dissolve the Parliament of the Balearic Islands at any given time and call a snap election, provided that no motion of no confidence was in process and that dissolution did not occur before one year after a previous one under this procedure. In the event of an investiture process failing to elect a regional president within a 60-day period from the first ballot, the Parliament was to be automatically dissolved and a fresh election called.

The Parliament of the Balearic Islands was officially dissolved on 2 April 2019 with the publication of the corresponding decree in the BOIB, setting election day for 26 May.

=== Electoral system ===
Voting for the Parliament was based on universal suffrage, comprising all Spanish nationals over 18 years of age, registered in the Balearic Islands and with full political rights, provided that they had not been deprived of the right to vote by a final sentence. (Note: Amendments in 2018 granted the right to vote to those legally incapacitated.) Additionally, non-resident citizens were required to apply for voting, a system known as "begged" voting (Spanish: Voto rogado).

The Parliament of the Balearic Islands had 59 seats. All were elected in four multi-member constituencies—corresponding to the islands of Mallorca, Menorca, Ibiza and Formentera, each of which was assigned a fixed number of seats—using the D'Hondt method and closed-list proportional voting, with a five percent-threshold of valid votes (including blank ballots) in each constituency. The use of this electoral method resulted in a higher effective threshold depending on district magnitude and vote distribution.

As a result of the aforementioned allocation, each Parliament constituency was entitled the following seats:

| Seats | Constituencies |
|---|---|
| 33 | Mallorca |
| 13 | Menorca |
| 12 | Ibiza |
| 1 | Formentera |

The law did not provide for by-elections to fill vacant seats; instead, any vacancies arising after the proclamation of candidates and during the legislative term were filled by the next candidates on the party lists or, when required, by designated substitutes.

=== Outgoing parliament ===
The table below shows the composition of the parliamentary groups in the chamber at the time of dissolution.

Parliamentary composition in April 2019
| Groups | Parties | Legislators | |
| Groups | Parties | Seats | Total |
|---|---|---|---|
| People's Parliamentary Group | PP | 19 | 19 |
| Socialist Parliamentary Group | PSIB–PSOE | 14 | 14 |
| We Can Balearic Islands Parliamentary Group | Podemos | 7 | 7 |
| More for Mallorca Parliamentary Group | Més | 5 | 6 |
| More for Mallorca Parliamentary Group | ERC | 1 | 6 |
| El Pi–Proposal for the Isles Parliamentary Group | El Pi | 3 | 3 |
| More for Menorca Parliamentary Group | MxMe | 3 | 3 |
| Mixed Parliamentary Group | Cs | 2 | 7 |
| Mixed Parliamentary Group | GxF | 1 | 7 |
| Mixed Parliamentary Group | INDEP | 4 (Note: Xelo Huertas, Montse Seijas and Salvador Aguilera, former Podemos legislators; Álvaro Gijón, former PP legislator.) | 7 |

== Parties and candidates ==
The electoral law allowed for parties and federations registered in the interior ministry, alliances and groupings of electors to present lists of candidates. Parties and federations intending to form an alliance were required to inform the relevant electoral commission within 10 days of the election call, whereas groupings of electors needed to secure the signature of at least one percent of the electorate in the constituencies for which they sought election, disallowing electors from signing for more than one list. Additionally, a balanced composition of men and women was required in the electoral lists, so that candidates of either sex made up at least 40 percent of the total composition.

Below is a list of the main parties and alliances which contested the election:

| Candidacy | Parties and alliances | Leading candidate | Ideology | Previous result | | Gov. | Ref. |
| Candidacy | Parties and alliances | Leading candidate | Ideology | Vote % | Seats | Gov. | Ref. |
|---|---|---|---|---|---|---|---|
| PP | List: People's Party (PP) | Biel Company | Conservatism; Christian democracy | 28.3% | 20 | No | |
| PSIB–PSOE | List: Socialist Party of the Balearic Islands (PSIB–PSOE) | Francina Armengol | Social democracy | 18.9% | 14 | Yes | |
| Podemos– EUIB | List: We Can (Podemos); United Left of the Balearic Islands (EUIB) (Note: In Mallorca, Menorca and Ibiza.) – Communist Party of the Balearic Islands (PCIB) – The Dawn Marxist Organization (La Aurora (OM)) – Republican Left (IR) – Feminist Party of Spain (PFE) | Juan Pedro Yllanes | Left-wing populism Direct democracy Democratic socialism | 16.4% | 10 | No | |
| Més | List: More for Mallorca (Més); InitiativeGreens (IV); Republican Left of Catalonia (ERC) | Miquel Ensenyat | Left-wing nationalism Democratic socialism Green politics | 13.8% | 6 | Yes | |
| El Pi | List: Proposal for the Isles (El Pi); More Ibiza (Más Eivissa); Insular Alternative (AL–in) | Jaume Font | Regionalism; Liberalism | 7.4% | 3 | No | |
| MxMe | List: More for Menorca (MxMe) | Josep Castells | Left-wing nationalism Democratic socialism Green politics | 1.5% | 3 | No | |
| Cs | List: Citizens–Party of the Citizenry (Cs) | Marc Pérez-Ribas | Liberalism | 6.4% | 2 | No | |
| GxF | List: People for Formentera (GxF); Socialist Party of the Balearic Islands (PSIB–PSOE) (Note: In Formentera.); United Left of the Balearic Islands (EUIB) | Silvia Tur | Environmentalism; Democratic socialism | 0.5% | 1 | No | |
| Vox–ACTUA; Baleares | List: Vox (Vox); Citizen Alternative for Tolerance, Unity and Action in the Balearics (ACTUA Baleares) | Jorge Campos | Right-wing populism Ultranationalism; National conservatism | —N/a | | No | |

The main opposition party, the People's Party (PP), held its regional congress in March 2017, electing Biel Company as new party leader over former regional president José Ramón Bauzá, who had resigned as the PP leader after the 2015 election. On 23 January 2019, Bauzà announced his withdrawal as PP member, resigning from his senator post, accusing his former party of "sowing and watering a [Catalan] nationalism" allegedly "exploited" by left-wing parties. It was later revealed that Bauzà would be running for Citizens (Cs) in the 2019 European Parliament election.

In May 2017, More for Menorca (MpM) was transformed into a party, electing 2015 candidate Nel Martí as its coordinator. In December 2018, Josep Castells was elected as its 2019 candidate. In June 2018, president of the Island Council of Mallorca Miquel Ensenyat won the More for Mallorca (Més) primaries to become its candidate.

In November 2018, We Can (Podemos) chose that its candidate would be Juan Pedro Yllanes, who was member of the Congress of Deputies at the time. In March 2019, Cs held its primaries, having Marc Pérez-Ribas winning over the regional leader and 2015 candidate Xavier Pericay.

== Campaign ==
=== Party slogans ===
| Party or alliance | Original slogan | English translation | Ref. |
|---|---|---|---|
| PP | « Ho farem bé » | "We will do it the right way" | |
| PSIB–PSOE | « Sempre endavant » | "Always forward" | |
| Podemos–EUIB | « La vida en el centro » | "Life at the centre" | |
| Més | « La teva decisió » | "Your decision" | |
| El Pi | « Ara toca Balears » | "Now it's time for the Balearics" | |
| MxMe | « Tenim projecte. Som futur » | "We have a project. We are the future" | |
| Cs | « ¡Vamos! » | "Come on!" | |
| GxF | « Formentera en bones mans » | "Formentera in good hands" | |
| Vox | « Tu voz en Baleares » | "Your voice in the Balearics" | |

=== Debates ===
2019 Balearic regional election debates
| Date | Organizer(s) | Moderator(s) | P Present (Note: Denotes a main invitee attending the event.) S Surrogate (Note: Denotes a main invitee not attending the event, sending a surrogate in their place.) NI Non-invitee A Absent invitee | | | | | | | | | | | |
| Date | Organizer(s) | Moderator(s) | PP | PSIB | UP | Més | El Pi | Cs | MxMe | GxF | Vox | PACT | Audience | Ref. |
|---|---|---|---|---|---|---|---|---|---|---|---|---|---|---|
| 15 May | IB3 | Neus Albis; Elena Gregori | P Company | P Armengol | P Yllanes | P Ensenyat | P Font | P P.-Ribas | P Castells | P Tur | NI | NI | 3.3% (12,000) | |
| 16 May | Canal4 TV | Cristina Roig | P Company | S Negueruela | S Martín | P Ensenyat | P Font | P P.-Ribas | P Castells | NI | P Campos | NI | — | |
| 20 May | Última Hora | Nekane Domblás | P Company | P Armengol | P Yllanes | P Ensenyat | P Font | P P.-Ribas | NI | NI | P Campos | P Gual | — | |
| 21 May | Student Council of the UIB (Note: University professors debate.) | Joan March | S Garcia | S March | S Martín | S Pons | S Serra | A | NI | NI | NI | NI | — | |
| 21 May | Student Council of the UIB | Rafel Gallego | S Duran | S Cano | S Martín | S Santiago | S Sureda | S Ballester | NI | NI | NI | NI | — | |
| 21 May | IB3 | Elena Serra | P Company | P Armengol | NI | NI | NI | NI | NI | NI | NI | NI | — | |
| 22 May | Diario de Mallorca | Marisa Goñi | P Company | P Armengol | P Yllanes | P Ensenyat | P Font | P P.-Ribas | NI | NI | P Campos | NI | — | |

== Opinion polls ==
The tables below list opinion polling results in reverse chronological order, showing the most recent first and using the dates when the survey fieldwork was done, as opposed to the date of publication. Where the fieldwork dates are unknown, the date of publication is given instead. The highest percentage figure in each polling survey is displayed with its background shaded in the leading party's colour. If a tie ensues, this is applied to the figures with the highest percentages. The "Lead" column on the right shows the percentage-point difference between the parties with the highest percentages in a poll.

=== Voting intention estimates ===
The table below lists weighted voting intention estimates. Refusals are generally excluded from the party vote percentages, while question wording and the treatment of "don't know" responses and those not intending to vote may vary between polling organisations. When available, seat projections determined by the polling organisations are displayed below (or in place of) the percentages in a smaller font; 30 seats were required for an absolute majority in the Parliament of the Balearic Islands.

Color key:

Poll conducted after legal ban on opinion polls

| Polling firm/Commissioner | Fieldwork date | Sample size | Turnout | PP | PSIB–PSOE | Més | Podemos | El Pi | Cs | EUIB | GxF | MxMe | Unidas Podemos | Vox | Lead |
|---|---|---|---|---|---|---|---|---|---|---|---|---|---|---|---|
| 2019 regional election | 26 May 2019 | —N/a | 53.9 | 22.2; 16 | 27.4; 19 | 9.2; 4 | (Note: Within Unidas Podemos.) | 7.3; 3 | 9.9; 5 | | 0.5; 1 | 1.4; 2 | 9.7; 6 | 8.1; 3 | 5.2 |
| IBES/IB3 | 20–25 May 2019 | 2,600 | ? | 19.1; 12/14 | 26.3; 17/19 | 10.7; 4/5 | | 7.0; 2/3 | 12.1; 7/9 | | 0.6; 1 | 1.7; 2 | 11.4; 6/8 | 8.0; 3/4 | 7.2 |
| ElectoPanel/Electomanía | 22–23 May 2019 | ? | ? | 19.6; 12 | 24.2; 18 | 11.9; 6 | | 6.8; 3 | 14.5; 7 | | 0.4; 1 | 1.6; 2 | 11.6; 7 | 7.1; 3 | 4.6 |
| ElectoPanel/Electomanía | 21–22 May 2019 | ? | ? | 20.0; 12 | 24.3; 18 | 11.8; 6 | | 6.9; 3 | 14.2; 7 | | 0.4; 1 | 1.6; 2 | 11.4; 7 | 6.9; 3 | 4.3 |
| ElectoPanel/Electomanía | 20–21 May 2019 | ? | ? | 19.9; 12 | 24.4; 17 | 11.9; 5 | | 6.8; 3 | 14.3; 7 | | 0.4; 1 | 1.6; 2 | 11.2; 7 | 7.5; 5 | 4.5 |
| ElectoPanel/Electomanía | 19–20 May 2019 | ? | ? | 19.7; 12 | 24.5; 18 | 11.9; 6 | | 6.9; 3 | 14.6; 7 | | 0.4; 1 | 1.6; 2 | 11.3; 7 | 7.2; 3 | 4.8 |
| NC Report/La Razón | 19 May 2019 | ? | ? | 19.1; 13/15 | 24.3; 16/18 | ? 5/6 | | ? 3/4 | ? 10/11 | | (Note: Within PSIB–PSOE.) | (Note: Within Més.) | ? 7/8 | ? 2/3 | 5.2 |
| IBES/Última Hora | 19 May 2019 | ? | ? | 22.0; 14/16 | 25.0; 17/19 | 11.0; 4/5 | | 6.0; 2/3 | 12.0; 6/8 | | ? 1 | 1.0; 2/3 | 11.0; 6/8 | 7.0; 2/3 | 3.0 |
| ElectoPanel/Electomanía | 16–19 May 2019 | ? | ? | 19.2; 12 | 24.7; 18 | 11.9; 5 | | 6.8; 3 | 15.2; 8 | | 0.4; 1 | 1.5; 2 | 11.0; 7 | 7.2; 3 | 5.5 |
| ElectoPanel/Electomanía | 13–16 May 2019 | ? | ? | 17.8; 12 | 25.1; 17 | 11.3; 5 | | 6.6; 3 | 17.0; 9 | | 0.4; 1 | 1.2; 2 | 11.0; 7 | 7.3; 3 | 7.3 |
| Sigma Dos/El Mundo | 13–14 May 2019 | ? | ? | 19.7; 13/15 | 27.1; 17/20 | 10.4; 5/6 | | 7.1; 2/3 | 12.7; 8/9 | | 0.5; 1 | | 11.8; 6 | 8.3; 3 | 7.4 |
| ElectoPanel/Electomanía | 10–13 May 2019 | ? | ? | 17.9; 10 | 23.4; 15 | 12.0; 5 | | 6.6; 3 | 18.4; 10 | | 0.4; 1 | 1.4; 3 | 10.5; 7 | 8.3; 5 | 5.0 |
| Gadeso | 30 Apr–11 May 2019 | 900 | 62–64 | 22.7; 14/15 | 27.2; 17/18 | 12.5; 7/8 | | 5.3; 2/3 | 13.7; 8/10 | | 0.5; 1 | | 13.1; 8/10 | 5.0; 2/3 | 4.5 |
| ElectoPanel/Electomanía | 7–10 May 2019 | ? | ? | 17.0; 10 | 23.4; 15 | 11.7; 5 | | 6.9; 3 | 19.1; 10 | | 0.4; 1 | 1.4; 3 | 10.6; 7 | 8.7; 5 | 4.3 |
| ElectoPanel/Electomanía | 4–7 May 2019 | ? | ? | 16.4; 10 | 23.3; 15 | 11.5; 5 | | 7.1; 3 | 19.6; 10 | | 0.4; 1 | 1.4; 3 | 10.4; 7 | 9.0; 5 | 3.7 |
| ElectoPanel/Electomanía | 29 Apr–4 May 2019 | ? | ? | 16.2; 10 | 23.7; 16 | 11.3; 5 | | 7.0; 3 | 19.7; 10 | | 0.4; 1 | 1.4; 3 | 10.3; 6 | 8.8; 5 | 4.0 |
| April 2019 general election | 28 Apr 2019 | —N/a | 65.4 | 16.8 (10) | 26.4 (19) | 4.9 (2) | | 2.3 (0) | 17.4 (10) | | – | | 17.8 (12) | 11.3 (6) | 8.6 |
| CIS | 21 Mar–23 Apr 2019 | 577 | ? | 20.7; 14/16 | 25.2; 17/19 | 11.9; 7/8 | | 6.0; 2/3 | 13.1; 9/10 | | | | 12.9; 7/8 | 5.1; 0/1 | 4.5 |
| ElectoPanel/Electomanía | 31 Mar–7 Apr 2019 | ? | ? | 17.9; 11 | 21.1; 16 | 12.6; 6 | | 7.5; 3 | 13.5; 7 | | 0.5; 1 | 1.5; 3 | 10.3; 7 | 10.1; 5 | 3.2 |
| ElectoPanel/Electomanía | 24–31 Mar 2019 | ? | ? | 17.4; 11 | 21.3; 16 | 13.0; 6 | | 7.6; 3 | 14.0; 7 | | 0.5; 1 | 1.5; 3 | 10.0; 6 | 10.2; 6 | 3.9 |
| ElectoPanel/Electomanía | 17–24 Mar 2019 | ? | ? | 17.5; 11 | 22.1; 16 | 13.1; 6 | | 7.7; 3 | 13.6; 7 | | 0.5; 1 | 1.5; 3 | 9.7; 6 | 9.9; 6 | 4.6 |
| ElectoPanel/Electomanía | 10–17 Mar 2019 | ? | ? | 17.3; 11 | 21.1; 15 | 13.4; 6 | | 7.6; 3 | 12.9; 6 | | 0.5; 1 | 1.5; 3 | 9.9; 7 | 11.4; 7 | 3.8 |
| ElectoPanel/Electomanía | 3–10 Mar 2019 | ? | ? | 16.9; 11 | 20.6; 15 | 13.3; 6 | | 8.0; 3 | 13.5; 7 | | 0.5; 1 | 1.5; 3 | 10.0; 6 | 11.5; 7 | 3.7 |
| ElectoPanel/Electomanía | 22 Feb–3 Mar 2019 | ? | ? | 16.3; 11 | 20.5; 15 | 14.1; 7 | | 8.0; 3 | 13.7; 6 | | 0.5; 1 | 1.5; 3 | 9.7; 6 | 11.9; 7 | 4.2 |
| IBES/Última Hora | 15–19 Oct 2018 | 900 | ? | 23.0; 17 | 19.0; 12/13 | 9.0; 3/4 | 15.0; 8/9 | 9.0; 4 | 17.0; 10 | 2.0; 0 | ? 1 | 1.0; 2 | – | – | 4.0 |
| IBES/Última Hora | 2–15 Jan 2018 | 1,400 | ? | 25.0; 19/20 | 20.0; 14/15 | 11.0; 6/7 | 12.0; 7 | 10.0; 4 | 13.0; 6/7 | 3.0; 0 | ? 1 | | – | – | 5.0 |
| IBES/Última Hora | 8–19 May 2017 | 1,200 | ? | 26.0; 20 | 21.0; 13 | 13.0; 7 | 13.0; 8 | 8.0; 4 | 11.0; 6 | 2.0; 0 | ? 1 | | – | – | 5.0 |
| IBES/Última Hora | 19–29 Jul 2016 | 2,400 | ? | 27.0; 17 | 20.0; 13 | 15.0; 9 | 14.0; 10 | 9.0; 3 | 11.0; 6 | 2.0; 0 | ? 1 | | – | – | 7.0 |
| 2016 general election | 26 Jun 2016 | —N/a | 60.7 | 35.1 (22) | 20.1 (12) | (Note: Within Units Podem Més.) | | – | 14.6 (9) | | – | – | 25.4 (16) | – | 9.7 |
| 2015 general election | 20 Dec 2015 | —N/a | 63.3 | 29.1 (20) | 18.3 (11) | 7.0 (4) | 23.1 (15) | 2.7 (0) | 14.8 (9) | 2.4 (0) | – | – | – | – | 6.0 |
| 2015 regional election | 24 May 2015 | —N/a | 57.1 | 28.5; 20 | 18.9; 14 | 15.3; 9 | 14.7; 10 | 7.9; 3 | 6.4; 2 | 2.0; 0 | 0.5; 1 | | – | – | 9.1 |

== Results ==
=== Overall ===
← Summary of the 26 May 2019 Parliament of the Balearic Islands election results →
| Parties and alliances | Popular vote | | | Seats | |
| Parties and alliances | Votes | % | ±pp | Total | +/− |
|---|---|---|---|---|---|
| Socialist Party of the Balearic Islands (PSIB–PSOE) | 117,480 | 27.37 | +8.43 | 19 | +5 |
| People's Party (PP)^{1} | 95,295 | 22.20 | −6.11 | 16 | −4 |
| Citizens–Party of the Citizenry (Cs)^{2} | 42,519 | 9.90 | +3.51 | 5 | +3 |
| United We Can (Podemos–EUIB)^{3} | 41,824 | 9.74 | −6.66 | 6 | −4 |
| More for Mallorca (Més) | 39,415 | 9.18 | −4.62 | 4 | −2 |
| Vox–Citizen Alternative for Tolerance, Unity and Action (Vox–ACTUA Baleares) | 34,871 | 8.12 | New | 3 | +3 |
| El Pi–Proposal for the Isles (El Pi)^{4} | 31,348 | 7.30 | −0.05 | 3 | ±0 |
| More for Menorca (MxMe) | 6,058 | 1.41 | −0.11 | 2 | −1 |
| Animalist Party Against Mistreatment of Animals (PACMA) | 6,021 | 1.40 | +0.60 | 0 | ±0 |
| People for Formentera+PSOE+EUIB (GxF+PSOE+EUIB) | 2,036 | 0.47 | +0.01 | 1 | ±0 |
| Proposal for Ibiza (PxE)^{5} | 1,748 | 0.41 | −0.59 | 0 | ±0 |
| The Union of Formentera (PP–CompromísFormentera) (Sa Unió)^{6} | 1,420 | 0.33 | +0.03 | 0 | ±0 |
| Now Ibiza–Let's Win the Left (Ara)^{7} | 1,239 | 0.29 | −0.21 | 0 | ±0 |
| EPIC Ibiza Citizen Movement (MC EPIC) | 1,006 | 0.23 | ±0.00 | 0 | ±0 |
| Act (PACT) | 838 | 0.20 | New | 0 | ±0 |
| Independent Social Group (ASI) | 785 | 0.18 | −0.04 | 0 | ±0 |
| Four Islands Movement (M4illes) | 576 | 0.14 | New | 0 | ±0 |
| Spanish Liberal Project (PLIE) | 443 | 0.10 | −0.02 | 0 | ±0 |
| Blank ballots | 4,348 | 1.01 | −0.86 | | |
| Total | 429,270 | | | 59 | ±0 |
| Valid votes | 429,270 | 99.30 | +0.67 | | |
| Invalid votes | 3,009 | 0.70 | −0.67 | | |
| Votes cast / turnout | 432,279 | 53.93 | −3.20 | | |
| Abstentions | 369,339 | 46.07 | +3.20 | | |
| Registered voters | 801,618 | | | | |
Sources
Footnotes: ^{1} People's Party does not include results in Formentera.; ^{2} Citizens–Party of the Citizenry results are compared to the combined totals of Citizens–Party of the Citizenry and Citizens of Menorca–Ciutadella de Menorca People's Union in the 2015 election.; ^{3} United We Can results are compared to the combined totals of We Can and Let's Win the Balearic Islands in the 2015 election, not including results in Ibiza.; ^{4} El Pi–Proposal for the Isles does not include results in Ibiza.; ^{5} Proposal for Ibiza results are compared to the combined totals of Proposal for the Isles, More Ibiza–Democratic Corsairs and Island Alternative in Ibiza in the 2015 election.; ^{6} The Union of Formentera results are compared to the combined totals of People's Party and Commitment to Formentera in Formentera in the 2015 election.; ^{7} Now Ibiza–Let's Win the Left results are compared to the combined totals of Let's Win the Balearic Islands and Republican Left–Ibiza Yes in Ibiza in the 2015 election.

Popular vote
| PSIB–PSOE | 27.37% |
| PP | 22.20% |
| Cs | 9.90% |
| Podemos–EUIB | 9.74% |
| Més | 9.18% |
| Vox–AB | 8.12% |
| El Pi | 7.30% |
| MxMe | 1.41% |
| PACMA | 1.40% |
| GxF+PSOE+EUIB | 0.47% |
| Others | 1.88% |
| Blank ballots | 1.01% |

Seats
| PSIB–PSOE | 32.20% |
| PP | 27.12% |
| Podemos–EUIB | 10.17% |
| Cs | 8.47% |
| Més | 6.78% |
| Vox–AB | 5.08% |
| El Pi | 5.08% |
| MxMe | 3.39% |
| GxF+PSOE+EUIB | 1.69% |

=== Distribution by constituency ===
| Constituency | PSIB | | PP | | Cs | | UP | | Més | | Vox–AB | | El Pi | | MxMe | | GxF | |
| Constituency | % | S | % | S | % | S | % | S | % | S | % | S | % | S | % | S | % | S |
|---|---|---|---|---|---|---|---|---|---|---|---|---|---|---|---|---|---|---|
| Formentera | | | | | | | | | | | | | | | | | 54.8 | 1 |
| Ibiza | 30.5 | 5 | 32.5 | 5 | 8.8 | 1 | 11.6 | 1 | | | 5.0 | − | | | | | | |
| Mallorca | 27.2 | 10 | 20.5 | 7 | 10.2 | 3 | 9.4 | 3 | 11.6 | 4 | 9.2 | 3 | 8.9 | 3 | | | | |
| Menorca | 27.9 | 4 | 26.7 | 4 | 9.8 | 1 | 11.3 | 2 | | | 3.0 | − | 2.6 | − | 15.4 | 2 | | |
| Total | 27.4 | 19 | 22.2 | 16 | 9.9 | 5 | 9.7 | 6 | 9.2 | 4 | 8.1 | 3 | 7.3 | 3 | 1.4 | 2 | 0.5 | 1 |

== Aftermath ==
=== Government formation ===
Investiture; Nomination of Francina Armengol (PSIB)
| Ballot → | 27 June 2019 |
| Required majority → | 30 out of 59 |
| Yes: • PSIB (19); • Podemos–EUIB (6); • Més (4); • MxMe (2); • GxF (1) | 32 / 59 |
| No: • PP (16); • Cs (5); • Vox (3) | 24 / 59 |
| Abstentions: • El Pi (3) | 3 / 59 |
| Absentees | 0 / 59 |

== Bibliography ==
- Ley Orgánica 5/1985, de 19 de junio, del Régimen Electoral General (Organic Law 5/1985). Official State Gazette (in Spanish). 19 June 1985 [version as of 6 March 2019]. BOE-A-1985-11672.
- Ley 8/1986, de 26 de noviembre, Electoral de la Comunidad Autónoma de las Islas Baleares (Law 8/1986). Official State Gazette (in Spanish). 26 November 1986 [version as of 2 February 2019]. BOE-A-1987-2903.
- Ley Orgánica 1/2007, de 28 de febrero, de reforma del Estatuto de Autonomía de las Illes Balears (Organic Law 1/2007). Official State Gazette (in Spanish). 28 February 2007 [version as of 17 July 2010]. BOE-A-2007-4233.
- Ley 1/2019, de 31 de enero, del Gobierno de las Illes Balears (Law 1/2019). Official State Gazette (in Spanish). 31 January 2019 [version as of 2 February 2019]. BOE-A-2019-2862.
- Decreto 2/2019, de 1 de abril, de la presidenta de las Illes Balears, de disolución del Parlamento de las Illes Balears y de convocatoria de elecciones (Decree 2/2019). Official Gazette of the Balearic Islands (in Spanish). 1 April 2019.
