= 2015 Balearic regional election =

Election in the Spanish region of the Balearic Islands

- 24 May 2015

All 59 seats in the Parliament of the Balearic Islands 30 seats needed for a majority
- Opinion polls
- Registered: 766,383 ▲5.5%
- Turnout: 437,838 (57.1%) ▼1.7 pp
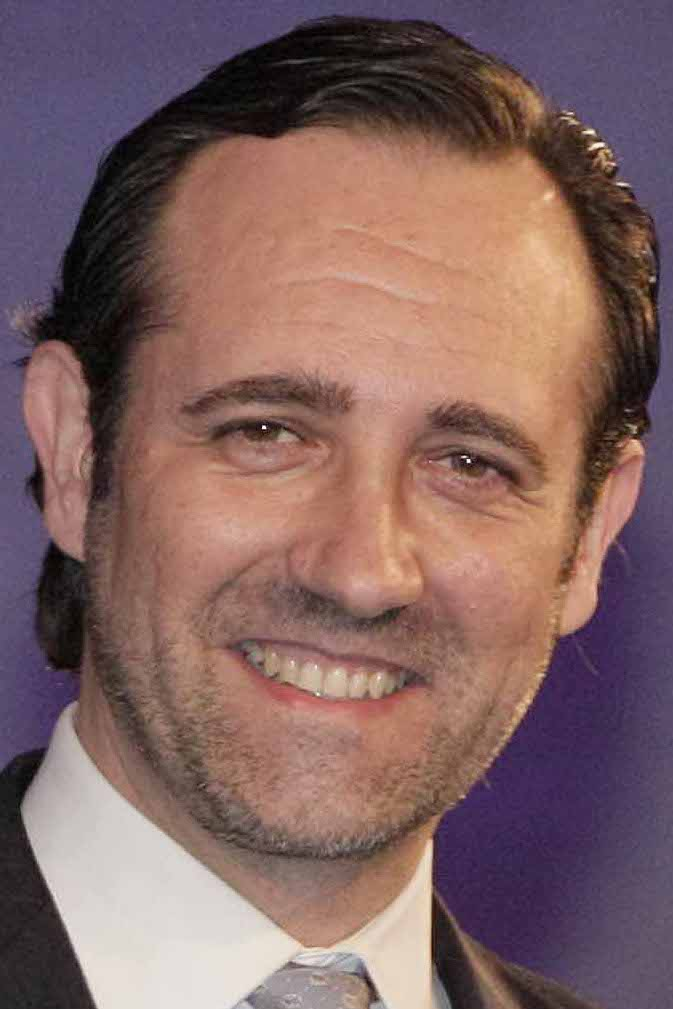

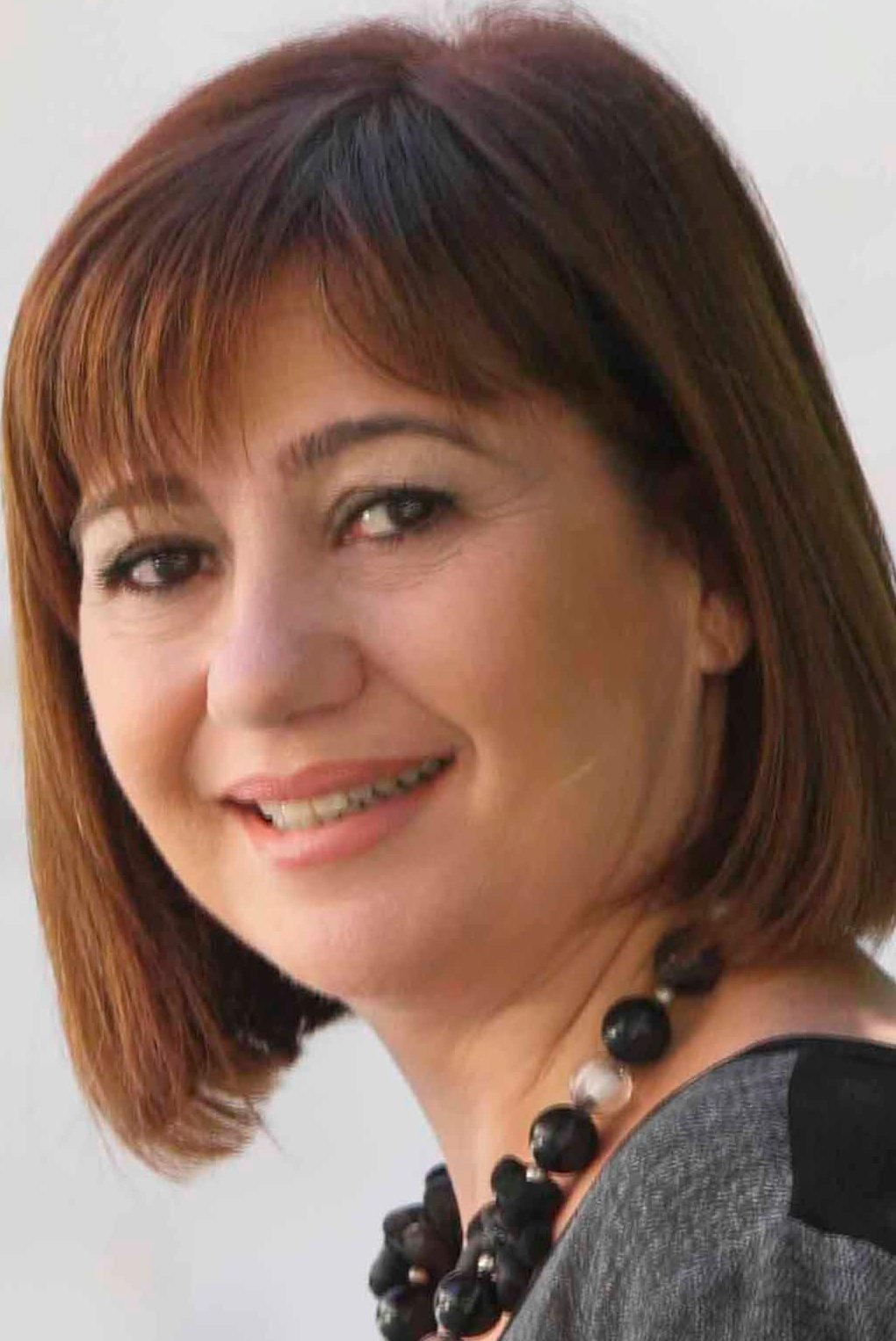

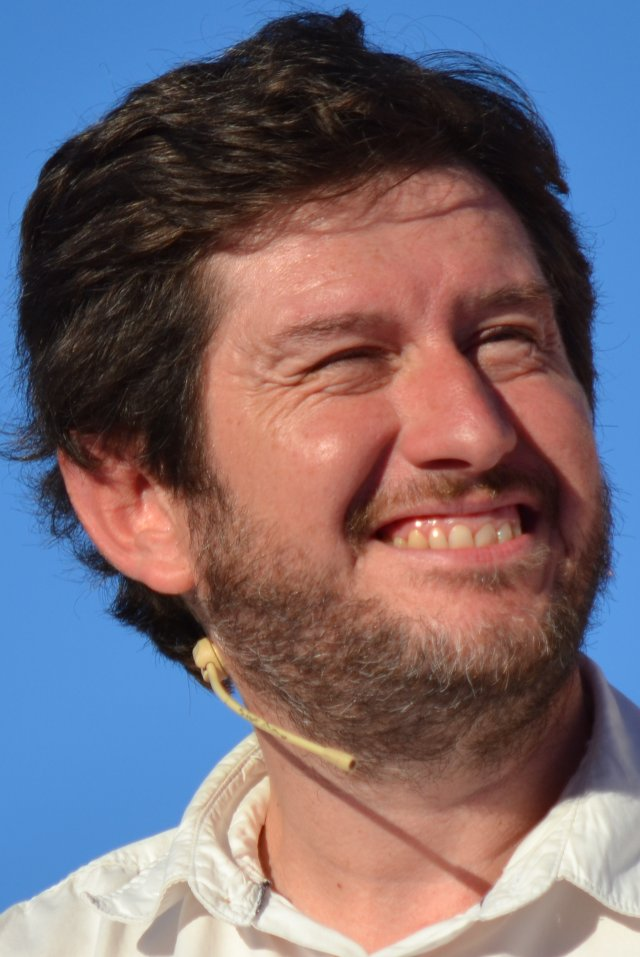

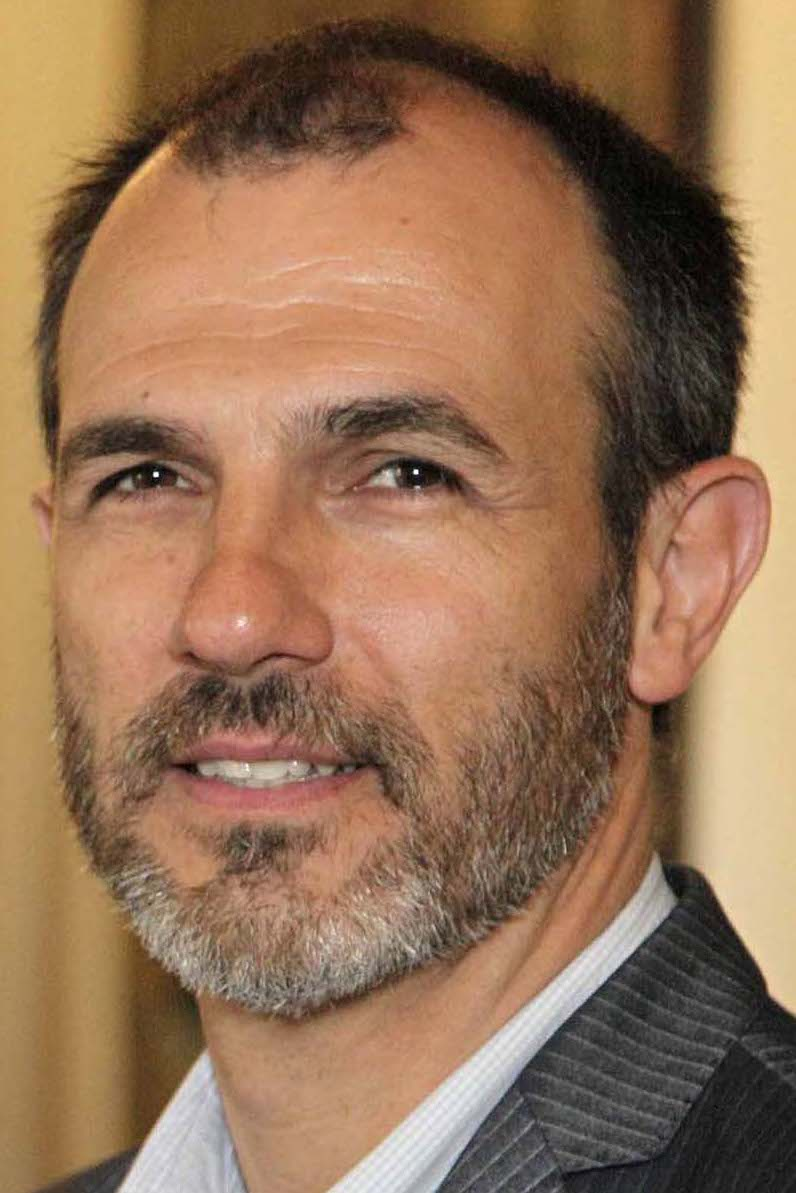

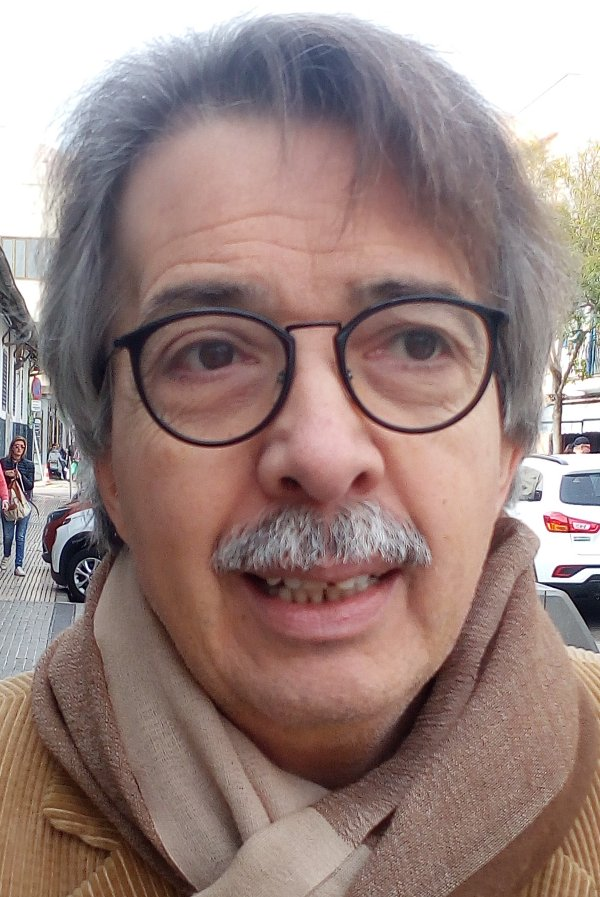

	First party	Second party	Third party
Leader	José Ramón Bauzá	Francina Armengol	Alberto Jarabo
Party	PP	PSIB–PSOE	Podemos/Podem
Leader since	11 September 2009	25 February 2012	14 February 2015
Leader's seat	Mallorca	Mallorca	Mallorca
Last election	35 seats, 46.7% (Note: Results for PP (46.4%, 35 seats) and PP–GUIF–Sa Unió (0.3%, 0 seats) in the 2015 election.)	18 seats, 24.4% (Note: Results for PSIB–PSOE (21.4%, 14 seats) and PSOE–PxE (3.0%, 4 seats) in the 2011 election.)	Did not contest
Seats won	20	14	10
Seat change	▼15	▼4	▲10
Popular vote	123,183	81,798	63,489
Percentage	28.5%	18.9%	14.7%
Swing	▼18.2 pp	▼5.5 pp	New party
	Fourth party	Fifth party	Sixth party
Leader	Biel Barceló	Jaume Font	Nel Martí
Party	Més	El Pi	MpM
Leader since	12 July 2013	2 November 2012	5 January 2015
Leader's seat	Mallorca	Mallorca	Menorca
Last election	4 seats, 8.6% (Note: Results for PSM–IV–ExM in the 2011 election.)	0 seats, 6.0% (Note: Results for IB–Lliga (2.9%, 0 seats), CxI (2.8%, 0 seats) and UMe (0.2%, 0 seats) in the 2011 election.)	1 seat, 1.0% (Note: Results for PSM–EN (0.9%, 1 seat) and EV–Me (0.2%, 0 seats) in the 2011 election.)
Seats won	6	3	3
Seat change	▲2	▲3	▲2
Popular vote	59,617	34,237	6,582
Percentage	13.8%	7.9%	1.5%
Swing	▲5.2 pp	▲1.9 pp	▲0.6 pp
	Seventh party	Eighth party
Leader	Xavier Pericay	Sílvia Tur
Party	C's	GxF+PSOE
Leader since	13 April 2015	10 April 2015
Leader's seat	Mallorca	Formentera
Last election	0 seats, 0.2%	1 seat, 0.5%
Seats won	2	1
Seat change	▲2	0
Popular vote	25,651	2,006
Percentage	5.9%	0.5%
Swing	▲5.7 pp	0.0 pp
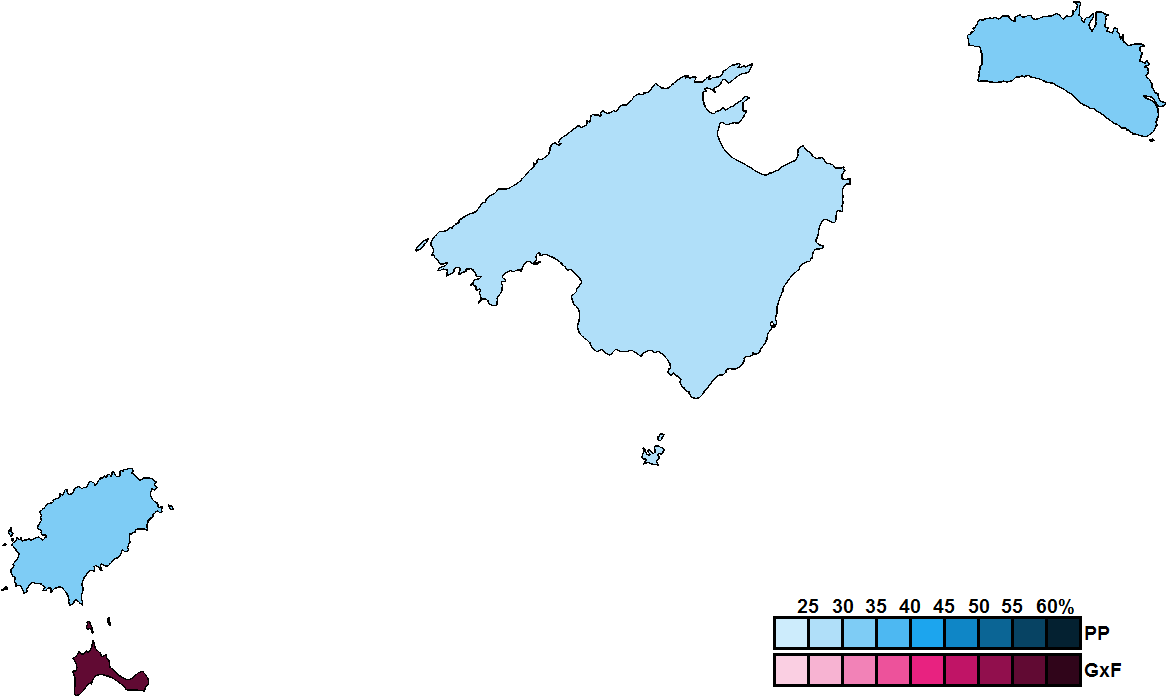
- Constituency results map for the Parliament of the Balearic Islands
President before election
José Ramón Bauzá
PP
President after election
Francina Armengol
PSOE

A regional election was held in the Balearic Islands on 24 May 2015 to elect the 9th Parliament of the autonomous community. All 59 seats in the Parliament were up for election. It was held concurrently with regional elections in twelve other autonomous communities and local elections all across Spain.

All in all, the election resulted in the loss of the parliamentary majority by the People's Party (PP), together with its worst election result ever in the islands. The Socialist Party of the Balearic Islands (PSIB) also saw losses, but could form a coalition government, led by socialist Francina Armengol, together with More for Mallorca (Més) and More for Menorca (MpM), obtaining confidence and supply support from We Can (Podemos/Podem) and the People for Formentera (GxF) deputy. It was the first time that left-wing parties had a majority of seats in the Balearic parliament, with previous PSIB-led governments having required the support of centrist Majorcan Union (UM) to rule in 1999 and 2007. Opposition, aside from PP, was formed by Proposta per les Illes (El Pi) and Citizens (C's), both obtaining their whole representation in Mallorca, but being close to winning seats in Ibiza and Menorca, respectively—in the latter, Ciutadella de Menorca People's Union represented the C's Menorcan branch.

== Background ==
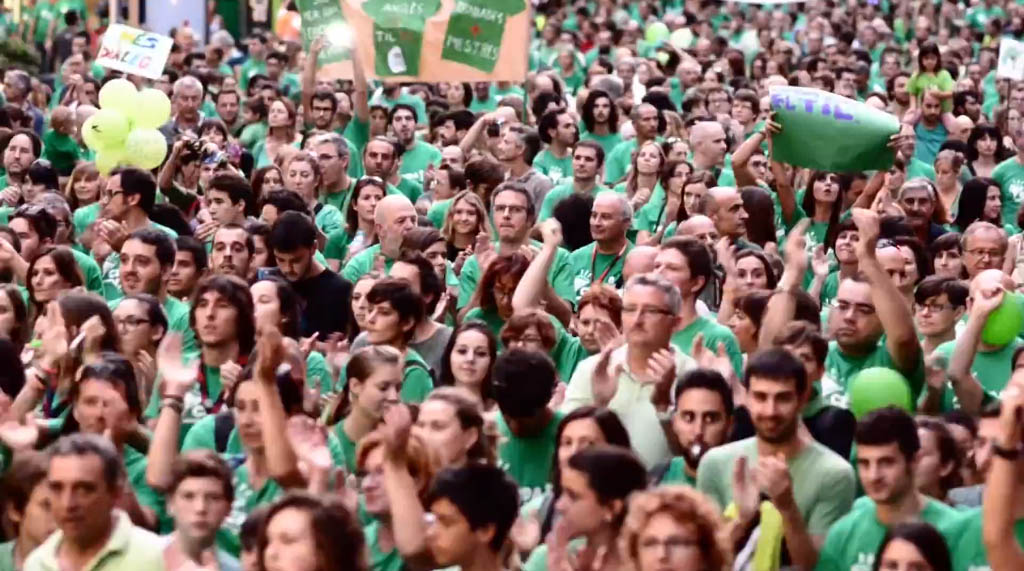
29 September 2013 demonstration.

In the 2011 election, the People's Party (PP), led by José Ramón Bauzá, regained an absolute majority, and Bauzá was elected president on 15 June 2011. A series of controversial and unpopular decrees and laws followed, the most discussed involving the language of the Balearic Islands—Catalan in its island dialects—and the education. These generated record-attendance demonstrations, the most important one on 29 September 2013, when more than 70,000 people demonstrated in Palma protesting, amongst other things, against the changes in the language decree. It established more school hours in Spanish and English, however the majority of public schools and their teachers were not prepared to carry it out.

The main opposition party, the Socialist Party of the Balearic Islands, elected Francina Armengol as its new leader in February 2012 in place of former regional president Francesc Antich.

During the 2011–2015 legislature, Agreement for Mallorca joined the coalition between the Socialist Party of Mallorca (PSM) and InitiativeGreens in 2013. It was renamed as More for Mallorca in October 2013, with PSM leader Biel Barceló as its secretary general. Its sister party Socialist Party of Menorca formed the coalition More for Menorca with the Greens of Menorca and Equo in July 2014.

The disbanded Majorcan Union (UM) had resulted in two parties with similar political views in the 2011 election: Convergence for the Isles—the political heir of UM—and Regionalist League of the Balearic Islands (IB–Lliga). None of them obtained representation in the Parliament. In November 2012, they both united with other local parties to create a new party called Proposal for the Isles to contest in the 2015 election not only in Mallorca, but also in Menorca and Ibiza. Jaume Font, former PP member and IB–Lliga leader, was elected as its president.

In addition, the Spanish politics were observing the growth of new parties like We Can (Spanish: Podemos) in the left and young parties like Citizens (C's) in the centre-right. In their regional branches, Alberto Jarabo was elected as the secretary general of Podemos in February 2015, while Xavier Pericay was elected as C's candidate in April 2015.

== Overview ==
Under the 2007 Statute of Autonomy, the Parliament of the Balearic Islands was the unicameral legislature of the homonymous autonomous community, having legislative power in devolved matters, as well as the ability to grant or withdraw confidence from a regional president. The electoral and procedural rules were supplemented by national law provisions.

=== Date ===
The term of the Parliament of the Balearic Islands expired four years after the date of its previous election, unless it was dissolved earlier. The election decree was required to be issued no later than 25 days before the scheduled expiration date of parliament and published on the following day in the Official Gazette of the Balearic Islands (BOIB), with election day taking place 54 days after the decree's publication. The previous election was held on 22 May 2011, which meant that the chamber's term would have expired on 22 May 2015. The election decree was required to be published in the BOIB no later than 28 April 2015, setting the latest possible date for election day on 21 June 2015.

The regional president had the prerogative to dissolve the Parliament of the Balearic Islands at any given time and call a snap election, provided that no motion of no confidence was in process and that dissolution did not occur before one year after a previous one under this procedure. In the event of an investiture process failing to elect a regional president within a 60-day period from the first ballot, the Parliament was to be automatically dissolved and a fresh election called.

The Parliament of the Balearic Islands was officially dissolved on 31 March 2015 with the publication of the corresponding decree in the BOIB, setting election day for 24 May.

=== Electoral system ===
Voting for the Parliament was based on universal suffrage, comprising all Spanish nationals over 18 years of age, registered in the Balearic Islands and with full political rights, provided that they had not been deprived of the right to vote by a final sentence, nor were legally incapacitated. Additionally, non-resident citizens were required to apply for voting, a system known as "begged" voting (Spanish: Voto rogado).

The Parliament of the Balearic Islands had 59 seats. All were elected in four multi-member constituencies—corresponding to the islands of Mallorca, Menorca, Ibiza and Formentera, each of which was assigned a fixed number of seats—using the D'Hondt method and closed-list proportional voting, with a five percent-threshold of valid votes (including blank ballots) in each constituency. The use of this electoral method resulted in a higher effective threshold depending on district magnitude and vote distribution.

As a result of the aforementioned allocation, each Parliament constituency was entitled the following seats:

Seats	Constituencies
33	Mallorca
13	Menorca
12	Ibiza
1	Formentera

The law did not provide for by-elections to fill vacant seats; instead, any vacancies arising after the proclamation of candidates and during the legislative term were filled by the next candidates on the party lists or, when required, by designated substitutes.

=== Outgoing parliament ===
The table below shows the composition of the parliamentary groups in the chamber at the time of dissolution.

Parliamentary composition in March 2015
Groups	Parties	Legislators	
Groups	Parties	Seats	Total
People's Parliamentary Group	PP	34	34
Socialist Parliamentary Group	PSIB–PSOE	17	18
Socialist Parliamentary Group	GxE	1	18
More Parliamentary Group	Més	3	5
More Parliamentary Group	IV	1	5
More Parliamentary Group	PSMe	1	5
Non-Inscrits	GxF	1	2
Non-Inscrits	El Pi	1 (Note: Antoni Pastor, former PP legislator.)	2

== Parties and candidates ==
The electoral law allowed for parties and federations registered in the interior ministry, alliances and groupings of electors to present lists of candidates. Parties and federations intending to form an alliance were required to inform the relevant electoral commission within 10 days of the election call, whereas groupings of electors needed to secure the signature of at least one percent of the electorate in the constituencies for which they sought election, disallowing electors from signing for more than one list. Additionally, a balanced composition of men and women was required in the electoral lists, so that candidates of either sex made up at least 40 percent of the total composition.

Below is a list of the main parties and alliances which contested the election:

Candidacy	Parties and alliances	Leading candidate	Ideology	Previous result		Gov.	Ref.
Candidacy	Parties and alliances	Leading candidate	Ideology	Vote %	Seats	Gov.	Ref.
PP	List: People's Party (PP)	José Ramón Bauzá	Conservatism; Christian democracy	46.7%	35	Yes	
PSIB–PSOE	List: Socialist Party of the Balearic Islands (PSIB–PSOE)	Francina Armengol	Social democracy	24.4%	18	No	
Més	List: More for Mallorca (Més); InitiativeGreens (IV); Equo (Equo)	Biel Barceló	Left-wing nationalism Democratic socialism Green politics	8.6%	4	No	
MpM	List: More for Menorca (MpM)	Nel Martí	Left-wing nationalism Democratic socialism Green politics	1.0%	1	No	
GxF	List: People for Formentera (GxF); Socialist Party of the Balearic Islands (PSIB–PSOE) (Note: In Formentera.); United Left of the Balearic Islands (EUIB)	Silvia Tur	Environmentalism; Democratic socialism	0.5%	1	No	
El Pi	List: Proposal for the Isles (El Pi)	Jaume Font	Regionalism; Liberalism	6.0%	0	No	
C's	List: Citizens–Party of the Citizenry (C's)	Xavier Pericay	Liberalism	0.2%	0	No	
GxE	List: People for Ibiza (GxE)	Juanjo Cardona	Progressivism	Contested in alliance (Note: GxE (1 seat) contested the 2011 election in alliance with the PSIB–PSOE.)		No	
Podemos/ Podem	List: We Can (Podemos)	Alberto Jarabo	Left-wing populism Direct democracy Democratic socialism	Did not contest		No	

== Campaign ==
=== Debates ===
2015 Balearic regional election debates
Date	Organizer(s)	Moderator(s)	P Present (Note: Denotes a main invitee attending the event.) S Surrogate (Note: Denotes a main invitee not attending the event, sending a surrogate in their place.) NI Non-invitee A Absent invitee											
Date	Organizer(s)	Moderator(s)	PP	PSIB	Més	El Pi	Guanyem	UPyD	C's	PREF	Podem	RC	Audience	Ref.
12 May	Deacorde Marketing		P Bauzá	P Armengol	P Barceló	S Melià	P Carmona	P Prieto	P Pericay	NI	P Jarabo	NI	—	
18 May	Student Council of the UIB (Note: University and employment debate.)	Àlvar Moreno	S Ferrer	S Negueruela	S Apesteguia	S Cabrera	S Martín	S Nieto	S Ballester	A	S Palmer	P González	—	
20 May	Student Council of the UIB (Note: Education and university debate.)	Neus Albis	S Alcover	S March	S Capellà	S Serra	S Martín	A	S Ballester	NI	S Camargo	NI	—	
20 May	IB3	Cristina Bugallo	P Bauzá	P Armengol	NI	NI	NI	NI	NI	NI	NI	NI	7.4% (89,000)	
21 May	Diario de Mallorca	Miguel Borrás	S Prohens	P Armengol	P Barceló	P Font	P Carmona	NI	P Pericay	NI	P Jarabo	NI	—	

== Opinion polls ==
The tables below list opinion polling results in reverse chronological order, showing the most recent first and using the dates when the survey fieldwork was done, as opposed to the date of publication. Where the fieldwork dates are unknown, the date of publication is given instead. The highest percentage figure in each polling survey is displayed with its background shaded in the leading party's colour. If a tie ensues, this is applied to the figures with the highest percentages. The "Lead" column on the right shows the percentage-point difference between the parties with the highest percentages in a poll.

=== Voting intention estimates ===
The table below lists weighted voting intention estimates. Refusals are generally excluded from the party vote percentages, while question wording and the treatment of "don't know" responses and those not intending to vote may vary between polling organisations. When available, seat projections determined by the polling organisations are displayed below (or in place of) the percentages in a smaller font; 30 seats were required for an absolute majority in the Parliament of the Balearic Islands.

Color key:

Poll conducted after legal ban on opinion polls

Polling firm/Commissioner	Fieldwork date	Sample size	Turnout	PP	PSIB–PSOE	Més	Guanyem	Lliga	CxI	UPyD	ERC	GxF	C's	El Pi	Podemos/Podem	CMe	Lead
2015 regional election	24 May 2015	—N/a	57.1	28.5; 20	18.9; 14	15.3; 9	2.0; 0	(Note: Within El Pi.)		0.9; 0	0.2; 0	0.5; 1	5.9; 2	7.9; 3	14.7; 10	0.4; 0	9.6
GAD3/Antena 3	11–22 May 2015	?	?	? 20/23	? 13/15	? 4/6	? 0/1			–	–	? 1	? 5/7	? 0/2	? 9/11	–	?
NC Report/La Razón	17 May 2015	600	?	33.8; 22/23	21.2; 14/15	8.2; 4/5	4.2; 1/2			0.4; 0	–	(Note: Within PSIB–PSOE.)	13.6; 8/9	4.5; 0	12.0; 8/9	–	12.6
IBES/Última Hora	27 Apr–8 May 2015	1,500	?	31.0; 19/22	21.0; 13/15	9.0; 4/6	4.0; 0/2			–	–	? 1	15.0; 5/6	4.0; 0/2	16.0; 8/11	1.0; 0/1	10.0
Sigma Dos/El Mundo	22–27 Apr 2015	1,000	?	33.6; 22/25	17.5; 13/14	11.6; 6	4.5; 0/1			–	–	0.4; 1	10.0; 4/5	3.5; 0	14.1; 8/11	–	16.1
Gadeso	18 Apr 2015	1,300	?	38.0– 40.0; 23/26	21.0– 23.0; 14/17	9.0– 10.0; 5/6	2.0– 4.0; 0			1.0– 2.0; 0	–	? 1	7.0– 8.0; 3/5	4.0– 6.0; 0/2	15.0– 17.0; 7/10	(Note: Within C's.)	17.0
CIS	23 Mar–19 Apr 2015	1,199	?	30.0; 19/20	22.3; 14/15	9.6; 5	2.1; 0			0.5; 0	–	0.4; 1	12.4; 9	2.4; 0	14.5; 10	–	7.7
IBES/Última Hora	16–25 Mar 2015	950	?	33.0; 22/24	18.0; 13/15	7.0; 4/6	5.0; 1/2			3.0; 0	–	? 1	9.0; 3/5	5.0; 2/3	16.0; 8/10	–	15.0
NC Report/La Razón	16–23 Mar 2015	600	?	35.2; 24/25	20.3; 14/15	6.8; 4/5	5.1; 1/2			0.8; 0	–		12.3; 6/7	5.1; 2/3	12.2; 6/7	–	14.9
IBES/Última Hora	26 Jan–6 Feb 2015	950	?	35.0; 26/27	19.0; 12/15	8.0; 3/4	4.0; 0/1			2.0; 0	–	1.0; 1	5.0; 0/1	5.0; 1/3	19.0; 12/13	–	16.0
Llorente & Cuenca	31 Oct 2014	?	?	? 24/28	? 13/17	? 7/10	–	–	–	? 2	(Note: Within Més.)		–	–	? 6/11	–	?
IBES/Última Hora	10–18 Sep 2014	1,000	?	38.0; 27	21.0; 15	9.0; 5	3.0; 0/1			4.0; 0/1		? 1	–	4.0; 1	15.0; 8/10	–	17.0
IBES/Última Hora	3–13 Jun 2014	900	?	? 27	? 14	? 6	? 3/4			? 2		? 1	–	? 0/1	? 5	–	?
2014 EP election	25 May 2014	—N/a	35.6	27.5 (20)	22.0 (18)	–	8.9 (6)	–	–	6.7 (5)	7.3 (4)	–	2.3 (0)	–	10.3 (6)	–	5.5
NC Report/La Razón	15 Oct–12 Nov 2013	?	?	? 28/29	? 19/20	? 6/7	? 1/2			? 1/2	–		–	? 1/2	–	–	?
IBES/Última Hora	3–14 Jun 2013	900	?	41.0; 28/29	27.0; 20	10.0; 5	6.0; 2/3			5.0; 1	–	? 1	–	4.0; 1	–	–	14.0
NC Report/La Razón	15 Apr–10 May 2013	200	?	42.2; 31/32	30.1; 19/20	14.3; 7/9	–	–	–	–	–		–	–	–	–	12.1
IBES/Última Hora	3–10 Dec 2012	1,000	?	41.0; 28	24.0; 18	11.0; 6	5.0; 2			5.0; 2	–	? 1	–	6.0; 2	–	–	17.0
IBES/Última Hora	28–31 May 2012	900	?	43.0; 33	23.0; 17	12.0; 6	4.0; 0	5.0; 1/2		5.0; 0/1	–	? 1	–	–	–	–	20.0
Gadeso	18 Mar 2012	900	?	39.0– 40.0	22.0– 23.0	8.0– 9.0	3.0– 4.0	3.0– 4.0	3.0– 4.0	2.0– 3.0	0.0– 1.0		–	–	–	–	17.0
IBES/Última Hora	1–15 Feb 2012	?	?	45.0; 31/33	23.0; 17	10.0; 5	5.0; 1/3	3.0; 0		5.0; 2	–	? 1	–	–	–	–	22.0
2011 general election	20 Nov 2011	—N/a	61.0	49.6 (34)	28.9 (20)	7.2 (4)	4.9 (1)	–	–	4.2 (0)	1.1 (0)	–	–	–	–	–	20.7
IBES/Última Hora	6–13 Sep 2011	600	?	48.0; 33/34	22.0; 16	10.0; 5	6.0; 2	2.0; 0		5.0; 1/2	–	? 1	–	–	–	–	26.0
2011 regional election	22 May 2011	—N/a	58.8	46.7; 35	24.4; 18	9.6; 5	3.2; 0	2.9; 0	2.8; 0	2.1; 0	1.3; 0	0.5; 1	0.2; 0	–	–	–	21.8

== Results ==
=== Overall ===
← Summary of the 24 May 2015 Parliament of the Balearic Islands election results →
Parties and alliances	Popular vote			Seats	
Parties and alliances	Votes	%	±pp	Total	+/−
People's Party (PP)^{1}	123,183	28.52	−18.16	20	−15
Socialist Party of the Balearic Islands (PSIB–PSOE)^{2}	81,798	18.94	−5.50	14	−4
We Can (Podemos/Podem)	63,489	14.70	New	10	+10
More for Mallorca (Més)^{3}	59,617	13.80	+5.19	6	+2
El Pi–Proposal for the Isles (El Pi)^{4}	34,237	7.93	+1.95	3	+3
Citizens–Party of the Citizenry (C's)	25,651	5.94	+5.74	2	+2
Let's Win the Balearic Islands (Guanyem)	8,740	2.02	−1.49	0	±0
Let's Win the Balearic Islands (Guanyem)^{5}	7,303	1.69	−1.45	0	±0
Left of Menorca–United Left (EM–EU)	1,437	0.33	−0.04	0	±0
More for Menorca (MpM)^{6}	6,582	1.52	+0.48	3	+2
Union, Progress and Democracy (UPyD)	3,896	0.90	−1.18	0	±0
Animalist Party Against Mistreatment of Animals (PACMA)	3,476	0.80	+0.41	0	±0
People for Formentera+PSOE (GxF+PSOE)	2,006	0.46	+0.01	1	±0
Citizens of Menorca–Ciutadella de Menorca People's Union (CMe–UPCM)	1,938	0.45	+0.33	0	±0
People for Ibiza (GxE)	1,680	0.39	New	0	±0
More Ibiza–Democratic Corsairs (MEC)	1,042	0.24	New	0	±0
EPIC Ibiza Citizen Movement (mcEPIC)	1,000	0.23	New	0	±0
Independent Social Group (ASI)	953	0.22	−0.04	0	±0
Zero Cuts (Recortes Cero)	819	0.19	New	0	±0
Family and Life Party (PFyV)	802	0.19	+0.08	0	±0
Island Alternative (AL–in)^{7}	794	0.18	−0.24	0	±0
Republican Left–Ibiza Yes (ER–Eivissa Sí)	766	0.18	−1.09	0	±0
Spanish Liberal Project (PLIE)	531	0.12	−0.01	0	±0
Renewal Party of Ibiza and Formentera (PREF)	396	0.09	+0.06	0	±0
Commitment to Formentera (CompromísFormentera)	383	0.09	New	0	±0
Blank ballots	8,080	1.87	−1.05		
Total	431,859			59	±0
Valid votes	431,859	98.63	+0.22		
Invalid votes	5,979	1.37	−0.22		
Votes cast / turnout	437,838	57.13	−1.67		
Abstentions	328,545	42.87	+1.67		
Registered voters	766,383				
Sources
Footnotes: ^{1} People's Party results are compared to the combined totals of People's Party and The Union of Formentera in the 2011 election.; ^{2} Socialist Party of the Balearic Islands results are compared to the combined totals of Socialist Party of the Balearic Islands and PSOE–Pact for Ibiza in the 2011 election.; ^{3} More for Mallorca results are compared to PSM–Initiative Greens–Agreement totals in the 2011 election.; ^{4} El Pi–Proposal for the Isles results are compared to the combined totals of Regionalist League of the Balearic Islands, Convergence for the Isles and Menorcan Union in the 2011 election.; ^{5} Let's Win the Balearic Islands results are compared to the combined totals of United Left of the Balearic Islands, Ibiza for Change, Sustainable Ibiza and Nationalist and Ecologist Agreement in the 2011 election.; ^{6} More for Menorca results are compared to the combined totals of Socialist Party of Menorca–Nationalist Agreement and The Greens of Menorca in the 2011 election.; ^{7} Island Alternative results are compared to New Alternative totals in the 2011 election.

Popular vote
PP	28.52%
PSIB–PSOE	18.94%
Podemos/Podem	14.70%
Més	13.80%
El Pi	7.93%
C's	5.94%
Guanyem	2.02%
MpM	1.52%
GxF+PSOE	0.46%
Others	4.28%
Blank ballots	1.87%

Seats
PP	33.90%
PSIB–PSOE	23.73%
Podemos/Podem	16.95%
Més	10.17%
El Pi	5.08%
MpM	5.08%
C's	3.39%
GxF+PSOE	1.69%

=== Distribution by constituency ===
Constituency	PP		PSIB		Podemos		Més		El Pi		C's		MpM		GxF	
Constituency	%	S	%	S	%	S	%	S	%	S	%	S	%	S	%	S
Formentera	26.7	−													59.3	1
Ibiza	32.9	5	23.7	4	17.3	3			5.7	−						
Mallorca	27.8	10	18.1	7	14.6	5	17.2	6	8.8	3	7.4	2				
Menorca	30.7	5	22.5	3	13.9	2			3.3	−			17.5	3		
Total	28.5	20	18.9	14	14.7	10	13.8	6	7.9	3	5.9	2	1.5	3	0.5	1

== Aftermath ==
=== Government formation ===
Investiture; Nomination of Francina Armengol (PSIB)
Ballot →	30 June 2015
Required majority →	30 out of 59
Yes: • PSIB (14); • Podemos (10); • Més (6); • MpM (3); • GxF (1)	34 / 59
No: • PP (20); • C's (2)	22 / 59
Abstentions: • El Pi (3)	3 / 59
Absentees	0 / 59

== Bibliography ==
- Ley Orgánica 5/1985, de 19 de junio, del Régimen Electoral General (Organic Law 5/1985). Official State Gazette (in Spanish). 19 June 1985 [version as of 31 March 2015]. BOE-A-1985-11672.
- Ley 8/1986, de 26 de noviembre, Electoral de la Comunidad Autónoma de las Islas Baleares (Law 8/1986). Official State Gazette (in Spanish). 26 November 1986 [version as of 3 November 2006]. BOE-A-1987-2903.
- Ley 4/2001, de 14 de marzo, del Gobierno de las Illes Balears (Law 4/2001). Official State Gazette (in Spanish). 14 March 2001 [version as of 28 March 2015]. BOE-A-2001-7026.
- Ley Orgánica 1/2007, de 28 de febrero, de reforma del Estatuto de Autonomía de las Illes Balears (Organic Law 1/2007). Official State Gazette (in Spanish). 28 February 2007 [version as of 17 July 2010]. BOE-A-2007-4233.
- Decreto 2/2015, de 30 de marzo, del presidente de las Illes Balears, de disolución y convocatoria de elecciones al Parlamento de las Illes Balears (Decree 2/2015). Official Gazette of the Balearic Islands (in Spanish). 30 March 2015.
