= Jorge Campos Asensi =

Spanish politician

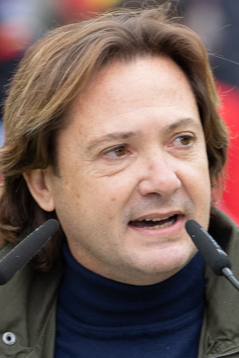

Member of the Parliament of the Balearic Islands
- Incumbent
- Assumed office 19 June 2019

Personal details
- Born: Jorge Campos Asensi; 1975 (age 50–51) Palma de Mallorca, Spain
- Party: Vox (2019-); Actúa Baleares (2018-); People's Party (2007-2017)
- Education: University of the Balearic Islands; University of Valencia

Jorge Campos Asensi is a Spanish politician and a member of the Parliament of the Balearic Islands representing the Vox since 2019 in which he was elected on a joint ticket with the localist Actua Baleares party. He is also leader of Vox in the Balearic Islands.

== Biography ==
Campos was born in Palma de Mallorca. He studied law at the University of the Balearic Islands before completing a master's degree in environmental science at the University of Valencia.

He was the founder of the Círculo Balear Cultural Society pressure group. The group was headquartered in Palma de Mallorca. In 2018, the group was converted into a political party Actúa Baleares (Citizen Alternative for Tolerance, Unity and Action). Ahead of the 2019 Balearic regional election, the party announced its intention to run on a joint list with Vox. Campos was elected to the parliament and subsequently became the chairman and leader of Vox on the Balearic Islands.
