= Ara Eivissa =

Political party

- Founded: 11 February 2019
- Merger of: Let's Win Ibiza; Republican Left of the Balearic Islands; Equo
- Political position: Left-wing
- Regional affiliation: Ara Més (2022–); Veus Progressistes (2019)

Website
- https://araeivissa.com/

Ara Eivissa (transl. Now Ibiza, Ara) is a political coalition formed in Ibiza in 2019. It was created ahead of the 2019 Spanish general election, the 2019 Balearic election and the 2019 local elections as an electoral alliance formed by Let's Win Ibiza (Guanyem), Republican Left of Catalonia (esquerra) and Equo (eQuo).

== Composition ==
Party
Let's Win Ibiza (Guanyem)
Republican Left of Catalonia (Esquerra)
Greens Equo (Equo)
