= Proposta per Eivissa =

Proposal for Ibiza Proposta per Eivissa
- Founded: September 2018
- Dissolved: 30 April 2021
- Merger of: Proposal for the Isles; More Ibiza; Insular Alternative
- Political position: Left-wing to Centre-right

Proposta per Eivissa (transl. Proposal for Ibiza, PxE) was a political coalition formed in Ibiza in 2018. It was created ahead of the 2019 Balearic election and the 2019 local elections as an electoral alliance formed by Proposal for the Isles (El Pi), More Ibiza (Más Eivissa) and Insular Alternative (AL–in).

After the integration of Más Eivissa into El Pi in April 2021, the alliance was dissolved.

== Composition ==
Party
Proposal for the Isles (El Pi)
More Ibiza (Más Eivissa)
Island Alternative (AL–in)
