= Proposta per les Illes =

El Pi–Proposta per les Illes
- President: Tolo Gili
- Founded: 2 November 2012
- Merger of: List: Regionalist League of the Balearic Islands; Convergence for the Isles; Menorcan Union; Es Nou Partit; Aliança Liberal de Manacor; New Local Independents; Sud Unificat; Independents de Marratxí; Coalition for Manacor (from 2013); Más Eivissa (from 2020)
- Headquarters: Plaça Porta Pintada, 6. 1r esquerra 07002 Palma, Mallorca
- Membership (2021): 586
- Ideology: Liberalism; Balearic regionalism
- Political position: Centre to centre-right
- National affiliation: Coalition for a Solidary Europe (since 2019)
- Colours: Turquoise; Purple (until 2021)
- Parliament of the Balearic Islands: 0 / 59
- Island Council of Mallorca: 2 / 33
- Mayors in Mallorca: 11 / 68
- Town councillors in the Balearic Islands (Note: Results of El PI, On Son Servera-El Pi and Convergència-PI lists.): 88 / 925

Website
- el–pi.com

Proposta per les Illes (Catalan for "Proposal for the Islands"), or simply El Pi (pi means pine in Catalan), is a liberal Balearic autonomist political party, formed in November 2012 from the merger of several nationalist and regionalist parties: Convergència per les Illes (the successor of the Majorcan Union), the Lliga Regionalista de les Illes Balears, the Menorcan Union and Es Nou Partit. The party's two main leaders are Jaume Font (former leader of the Lliga Regionalista) and Josep Melià (former leader of Convergència). As the merger of parties from Mallorca, Menorca and Ibiza, el PI has elected representatives on each of these three islands, including 6 mayors and 82 councillors in 34 municipalities.

== Ideology ==
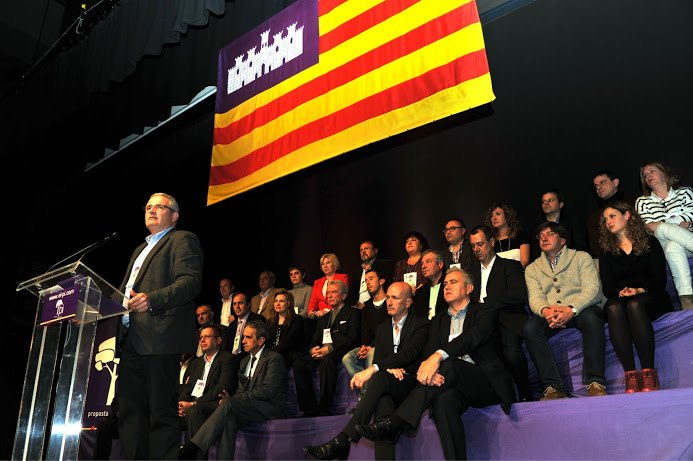
PI founding congress (16 March 2013).

El Pi aims to seek political dialogue and moderation, rejecting what it considers dogmatism and political posturing, defining its values as centrist and autonomist. While defending the Spanish Constitution and the Balearic Islands' Statute of Autonomy, the party also aims to promote the language, culture and traditions of the islands as well as its natural resources. El Pi defines itself as "socially and politically a big tent, balearista political formation with a tendency to centrism". While accepting the need to eventually reduce the deficits in public spending, el Pi has issued a statement critical of the Balearic government's announced intention to raise new taxes. The party's regionalist and nationalist roots, and its continued emphasis on promoting Balearic autonomy and the Catalan language as the "unforsakeable badge of identity of our community", place it within the ambit of moderate Catalan nationalism in the Balearic Islands.

== Electoral performance ==
=== Council of Mallorca ===
Election	Leading candidate	Votes	%	Seats	+/–	Government
2015	Antoni Pastor	32,387	9.4 (#5)	3 / 59	3	Opposition
2019	Xisca Mora	30,746	9.1 (#6)	3 / 59	0	Opposition
2023	Antoni Salas	18,905	5.2 (#5)	2 / 59	1	Opposition

=== Parliament of the Balearic Islands ===
Election	Leading candidate	Votes	%	Seats	+/–	Government
2015	Jaume Font	34,237	7.9 (#5)	3 / 59	3	Opposition
2019	Jaume Font	31,348	7.3 (#7)	3 / 59	0	Opposition
2023	Josep Melià	17,089	3.8 (#6)	0 / 59	3	Extra-parliamentary

=== Cortes Generales ===
==== Balearic Islands ====
Congress of Deputies
Date	Votes			Seats		Size
Date	#	%	±pp	#	±	Size
2015	12,910	2.7%	—	0 / 8	—	6th
2016	—N/a					
2019	11,692	2.3%	—	0 / 8	—	7th

Senate
Date	Seats		Size
Date	#	±	Size
2015	0 / 5	—	6th
2016	—N/a		
2019	0 / 5	—	5th

In the 2019 European Parliament election in Spain, PI joined the Coalition for a Solidary Europe electoral list (El Pi-Proposta per les Illes Balears-Coalición por una Europa Solidaria, CEUS) with other regionalist parties. María del Mar Llaneras Pascual was the top PI representative in the list, in the 5th position.

== Symbols ==
Logo from November 2012 to February 2021.

Logo from February 2021 to present.
