= Guanyem les Illes Balears =

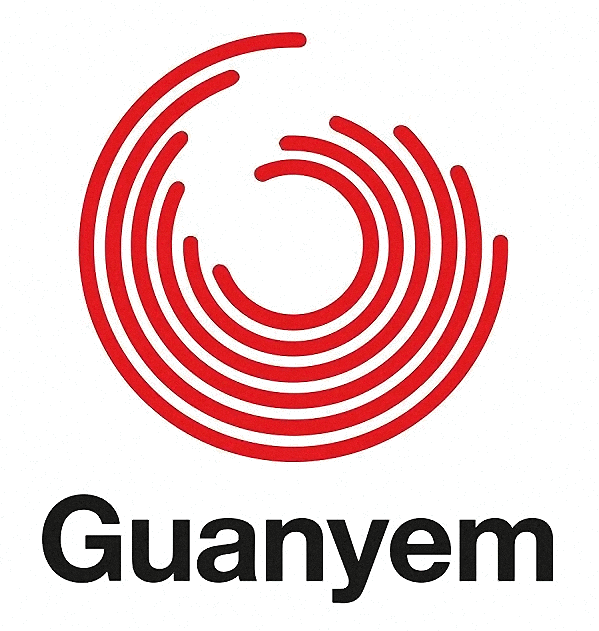
- Founded: 2015
- Merger of: EUIB; CLI–AS
- Political position: Left-wing

Guanyem les Illes Balears (Catalan for Let's Win the Balearic Islands, Guanyem) is an electoral alliance formed by United Left of the Balearic Islands and Building the Left–Socialist Alternative to contest the 2015 Balearic regional election. Both parties also contested, together with Podemos, the 2015 Ibiza Island Council election.

== Member parties ==
- United Left of the Balearic Islands (EUIB)
- Building the Left–Socialist Alternative (CLI–AS)
