= First government of Francina Armengol =

1st government of Francina Armengol
- 10th Government of the Balearic Islands
- 2015–2019
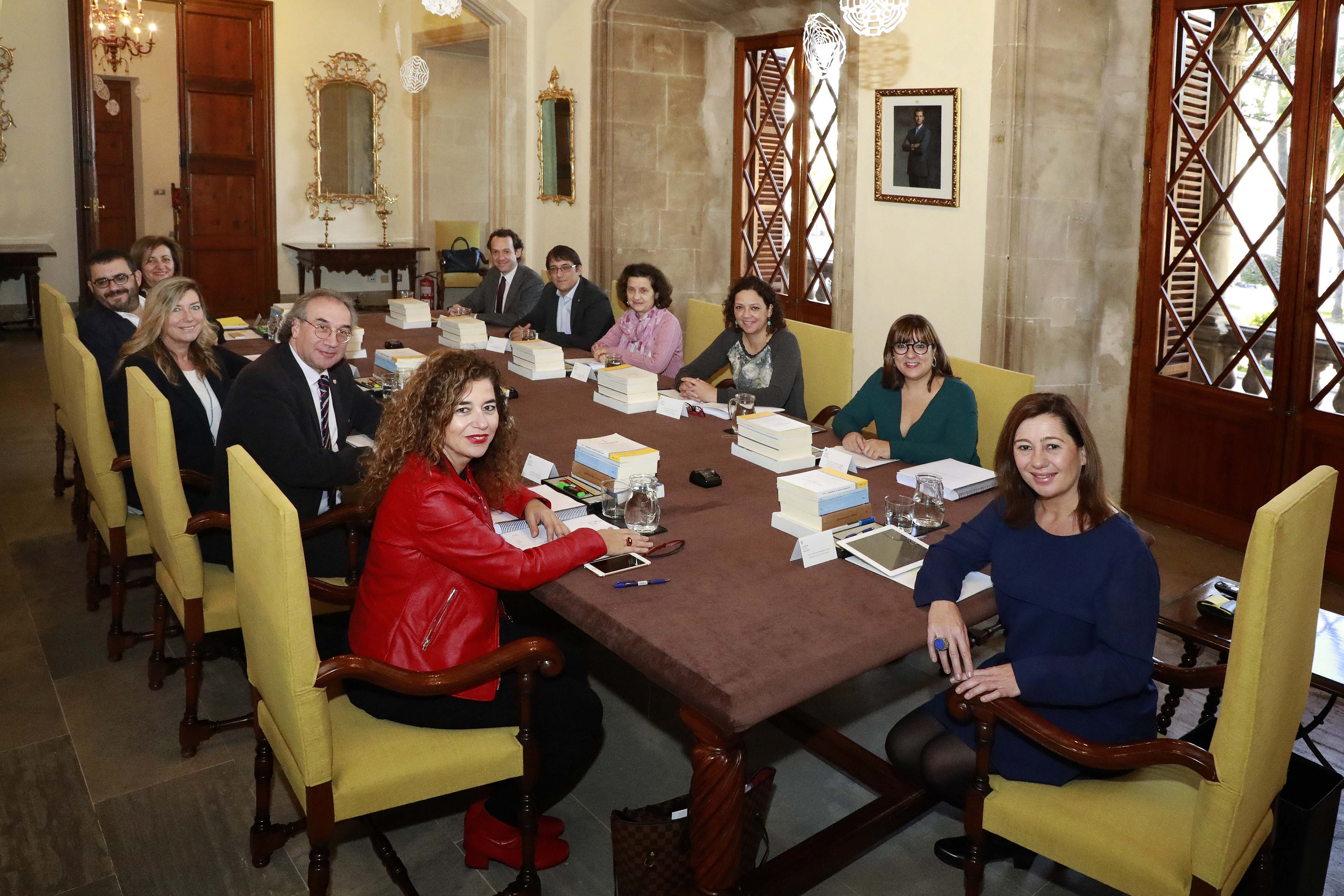
- The government in December 2017.
- Date formed: 2 July 2015
- Date dissolved: 3 July 2019

People and organisations
- Monarch: Felipe VI
- President: Francina Armengol
- Vice President: Biel Barceló (2015–2017); Bel Busquets (2017–2019)
- No. of ministers: 10 (Note: Does not include the President.)
- Total no. of members: 14
- Member parties: PSIB–PSOE; Més; MpM (2015–2017)
- Status in legislature: Minority coalition government
- Opposition party: PP
- Opposition leader: Marga Prohens (2015–2017); Biel Company (2017–2019)

History
- Election: 2015 regional election
- Outgoing election: 2019 regional election
- Legislature term: 9th Parliament
- Budget: 2016, 2017, 2018, 2019
- Predecessor: Bauzá
- Successor: Armengol II

The first government of Francina Armengol was formed on 2 July 2015, following the latter's election as President of the Balearic Islands by the Parliament of the Balearic Islands on 30 June and her swearing-in on 2 July, as a result of the loss of the absolute majority by the People's Party (PP) at the 2019 regional election and the emergence of a left-of-centre majority led by the Socialist Party of the Balearic Islands (PSIB–PSOE). It succeeded the Bauzá government and was the Government of the Balearic Islands from 2 July 2015 to 3 July 2019, a total of 1,462 days, or 4 years and 1 day.

The cabinet comprised members of the PSIB–PSOE, More for Mallorca (Més) and More for Menorca (MpM), as well as a number of independents proposed by all three parties.

== Investiture ==
Investiture; Francina Armengol (PSIB)
Ballot →	30 June 2015
Required majority →	30 out of 59
Yes: • PSIB (14); • Podemos (10); • Més (6); • MpM (3); • GxF (1)	34 / 59
No: • PP (20); • C's (2)	22 / 59
Abstentions: • El Pi (3)	3 / 59
Absentees	0 / 59

== Council of Government ==
The Government of the Balearic Islands was structured into the offices for the president, the vice president, 10 ministries and the post of the spokesperson of the Government.

← Armengol I Government → (2 July 2015 – 3 July 2019)
Portfolio	Name	Party	Took office	Left office	Ref.
President	Francina Armengol	PSIB–PSOE	2 July 2015	29 June 2019	
Vice President; Minister of Innovation, Research and Tourism	Biel Barceló	Més	2 July 2015	16 December 2017	
Minister of the Presidency; Spokesperson of the Government	Marc Pons	PSIB–PSOE	2 July 2015	7 April 2016	
Minister of Finance and Public Administrations	Catalina Cladera	PSIB–PSOE	2 July 2015	3 July 2019	
Minister of Education and University	Martí March	PSIB–PSOE (Ind.)	2 July 2015	3 July 2019	
Minister of Social Services and Cooperation	Fina Santiago	Més	2 July 2015	3 July 2019	
Minister of Health	Patricia Gómez	PSIB–PSOE	2 July 2015	3 July 2019	
Minister of Labour, Trade and Industry	Iago Negueruela	PSIB–PSOE	2 July 2015	3 July 2019	
Minister of Environment, Agriculture and Fisheries	Vicenç Vidal	Més	2 July 2015	3 July 2019	
Minister of Territory, Energy and Mobility	Joan Boned	PSIB–PSOE	2 July 2015	7 April 2016	
Minister of Participation, Transparency and Culture	Esperança Camps	MpM (Ind.)	2 July 2015	5 April 2016	
=== Changes 5 April 2016 ===
Portfolio	Name	Party	Took office	Left office	Ref.
Minister of Participation, Transparency and Culture	Vicenç Vidal took on the ordinary discharge of duties from 5 to 7 April 2016.				
=== Changes 7 April 2016 ===
Portfolio	Name	Party	Took office	Left office	Ref.
Minister of the Presidency; Spokesperson of the Government	Pilar Costa	PSIB–PSOE	7 April 2016	3 July 2019	
Minister of Territory, Energy and Mobility	Marc Pons	PSIB–PSOE	7 April 2016	3 July 2019	
Minister of Transparency, Culture and Sports (Note: On 7 April 2016, the Ministry of Participation, Transparency and Culture was rebranded as the Ministry of Transparency, Culture and Sports.)	Ruth Mateu	MpM	7 April 2016	1 April 2017	
=== Changes 1 April 2017 ===
Portfolio	Name	Party	Took office	Left office	Ref.
Minister of Transparency, Culture and Sports	Vicenç Vidal took on the ordinary discharge of duties from 1 to 8 April 2017.				
=== Changes 8 April 2017 ===
Portfolio	Name	Party	Took office	Left office	Ref.
Minister of Culture, Participation and Sports (Note: On 8 April 2017, the Ministry of Transparency, Culture and Sports was rebranded as the Ministry of Culture, Participation and Sports.)	Fanny Tur	Més (Ind.)	8 April 2017	3 July 2019	
=== Changes 16 December 2017 ===
Portfolio	Name	Party	Took office	Left office	Ref.
Vice President	Vacant from 16 to 18 December 2017.				
Minister of Innovation, Research and Tourism	Fina Santiago took on the ordinary discharge of duties from 16 to 18 December 2017.				
=== Changes 18 December 2017 ===
Portfolio	Name	Party	Took office	Left office	Ref.
Vice President; Minister of Innovation, Research and Tourism	Bel Busquets	Més	18 December 2017	3 July 2019	

== Departmental structure ==
Francina Armengol's first government was organised into several superior and governing units, whose number, powers and hierarchical structure varied depending on the ministerial department.

Unit/body rank

- (■) General secretary
- (■) Director-general
- (■) Temporary staff

Office (Original name)	Portrait	Name	Took office	Left office	Alliance/party	Ref.
=== Presidency ===
Presidency (Presidència del Govern)		Francina Armengol	2 July 2015	29 June 2019	PSIB–PSOE	
Presidency (Presidència del Govern)	2–16 July 2015: (■) Cabinet of the Presidency–Chief of Staff; (■) Coordination Office for the Cabinet of the Presidency; (■) Secretariat for Communication; (■) Secretariat for Citizen Services; (■) Secretariat for Protocol and Public Relations; (■) Secretariat for the Presidency; (■) Monitoring Office for Strategic Projects; 16 July 2015 – 23 February 2021: (■) Cabinet of the Presidency–Chief of Staff; (■) Secretariat for Strategic Projects; (■) Secretariat for Communication; (■) Secretariat for the Cabinet of the Presidency; (■) Secretariat for the Presidency; (■) Secretariat for Protocol and Public Relations; (■) Secretariat for Citizen Services					
Vice Presidency (Vicepresidència del Govern)		Biel Barceló	2 July 2015	16 December 2017 (resigned)	Més	
Vice Presidency (Vicepresidència del Govern)		Bel Busquets	18 December 2017	3 July 2019	Més	
Vice Presidency (Vicepresidència del Govern)	See Ministry of Innovation, Research and Tourism					
=== Ministry of Innovation, Research and Tourism ===
Ministry of Innovation, Research and Tourism (Conselleria d'Innovació, Recerca i Turisme)		Biel Barceló	2 July 2015	16 December 2017 (resigned)	Més	
Ministry of Innovation, Research and Tourism (Conselleria d'Innovació, Recerca i Turisme)		Fina Santiago (ordinary discharge of duties)	16 December 2017	18 December 2017	Més	
Ministry of Innovation, Research and Tourism (Conselleria d'Innovació, Recerca i Turisme)		Bel Busquets	18 December 2017	3 July 2019	Més	
Ministry of Innovation, Research and Tourism (Conselleria d'Innovació, Recerca i Turisme)	2 July 2015 – 3 July 2019: (■) General Secretariat of Innovation, Research and Tourism; (■) Directorate-General for Innovation and Research; (■) Directorate-General for Tourism; (■) Directorate-General for Technological Development; (■) Directorate-General for European Funds					
=== Ministry of the Presidency ===
Ministry of the Presidency (Conselleria de Presidència)		Marc Pons	2 July 2015	7 April 2016	PSIB–PSOE	
Ministry of the Presidency (Conselleria de Presidència)		Pilar Costa	7 April 2016	3 July 2019	PSIB–PSOE	
Ministry of the Presidency (Conselleria de Presidència)	2 July 2015 – 3 July 2019: (■) General Secretariat of the Presidency; (■) Directorate-General for Coordination; (■) Directorate-General for Institutional Relations and Foreign Action; (■) Directorate-General for Relations with the Parliament; (■) Directorate-General for Communication; (■) Directorate-General for Transparency and Good Governance (est. 8 Apr 2017)					
=== Ministry of Finance and Public Administrations ===
Ministry of Finance and Public Administrations (Conselleria d'Hisenda i Administracions Públiques)		Catalina Cladera	2 July 2015	3 July 2019	PSIB–PSOE	
Ministry of Finance and Public Administrations (Conselleria d'Hisenda i Administracions Públiques)	2 July 2015 – 3 July 2019: (■) General Secretariat of Finance and Public Administrations; (■) Directorate-General for Budgets and Financing; (■) Directorate-General for the Treasury, Financial Policy and Heritage; (■) Directorate-General for Civil Service and Public Administrations; (■) Directorate-General for Emergencies and Interior					
=== Ministry of Education and University ===
Ministry of Education and University (Conselleria d'Educació i Universitat)		Martí March	2 July 2015	3 July 2019	PSIB–PSOE (Independent)	
Ministry of Education and University (Conselleria d'Educació i Universitat)	2 July 2015 – 3 July 2019: (■) General Secretariat of Education and University; (■) Directorate-General for Planning, Organization and Centres; (■) Directorate-General for Teaching Staff; (■) Directorate-General for Vocational Training and Teacher Training; (■) Directorate-General for University Policy and Higher Education; (■) Directorate-General for Innovation and Educational Community					
=== Ministry of Social Services and Cooperation ===
Ministry of Social Services and Cooperation (Conselleria de Serveis Socials i Cooperació)		Vicenç Vidal	2 July 2015	3 July 2019	Més	
Ministry of Social Services and Cooperation (Conselleria de Serveis Socials i Cooperació)	2 July 2015 – 3 July 2019: (■) General Secretariat of Social Services and Cooperation; (■) Directorate-General for Planning and Social Services; (■) Directorate-General for Dependency; (■) Directorate-General for Children and Families (disest. 8 Aug 2015); (■) Directorate-General for Minors and Families (est. 8 Aug 2015); (■) Directorate-General for Cooperation					
=== Ministry of Health ===
Ministry of Health (Conselleria de Salut)		Patricia Gómez	2 July 2015	3 July 2019	PSIB–PSOE	
Ministry of Health (Conselleria de Salut)	2 July 2015 – 3 July 2019: (■) General Secretariat of Health; (■) Directorate-General for Planning, Evaluation and Pharmacy; (■) Directorate-General for Public Health and Participation; (■) Directorate-General for Health Accreditation, Teaching and Research; (■) Directorate-General for Consumer Affairs					
=== Ministry of Labour, Trade and Industry ===
Ministry of Labour, Trade and Industry (Conselleria de Treball, Comerç i Indústria)		Iago Negueruela	2 July 2015	3 July 2019	PSIB–PSOE	
Ministry of Labour, Trade and Industry (Conselleria de Treball, Comerç i Indústria)	2 July 2015 – 3 July 2019: (■) General Secretariat of Labour, Trade and Industry; (■) Directorate-General for Labour, Social Economy and Occupational Health; (■) Directorate-General for Trade and Business; (■) Directorate-General for Industrial Policy; (■) Directorate-General for Employment and Economy					
=== Ministry of Environment, Agriculture and Fisheries ===
Ministry of Environment, Agriculture and Fisheries (Conselleria de Medi Ambient, Agricultura i Pesca)		Fina Santiago	2 July 2015	3 July 2019	Més	
Ministry of Environment, Agriculture and Fisheries (Conselleria de Medi Ambient, Agricultura i Pesca)	2 July 2015 – 3 July 2019: (■) General Secretariat of Environment, Agriculture and Fisheries; (■) Directorate-General for Agriculture and Livestock; (■) Directorate-General for Fisheries and the Marine Environment; (■) Directorate-General for Water Resources; (■) Directorate-General for Environmental Education, Environmental Quality and Waste; (■) Directorate-General for Natural Areas and Biodiversity					
=== Ministry of Territory, Energy and Mobility ===
Ministry of Territory, Energy and Mobility (Conselleria de Territori, Energia i Mobilitat)		Joan Boned	2 July 2015	7 April 2016	PSIB–PSOE	
Ministry of Territory, Energy and Mobility (Conselleria de Territori, Energia i Mobilitat)		Marc Pons	7 April 2016	3 July 2019	PSIB–PSOE	
Ministry of Territory, Energy and Mobility (Conselleria de Territori, Energia i Mobilitat)	2 July 2015 – 3 July 2019: (■) General Secretariat of Territory, Energy and Mobility; (■) Directorate-General for Ports and Airports; (■) Directorate-General for Territory Planning; (■) Directorate-General for Transport (disest. 18 Feb 2016); (■) Directorate-General for Mobility and Transport (est. 18 Feb 2016); (■) Directorate-General for Architecture and Housing; (■) Directorate-General for Energy and Climate Change					
=== Ministry of Culture ===
Ministry of Participation, Transparency and Culture (Conselleria de Participació, Transparència i Cultura) (until 7 April 2016) Ministry of Transparency, Culture and Sports (Conselleria de Transparència, Cultura i Esports) (7 April 2016 – 8 April 2017) Ministry of Culture, Participation and Sports (Conselleria Cultura, Participació i Esports) (from 8 April 2017)		Esperança Camps	2 July 2015	5 April 2016 (resigned)	MpM (Independent)	
Ministry of Participation, Transparency and Culture (Conselleria de Participació, Transparència i Cultura) (until 7 April 2016) Ministry of Transparency, Culture and Sports (Conselleria de Transparència, Cultura i Esports) (7 April 2016 – 8 April 2017) Ministry of Culture, Participation and Sports (Conselleria Cultura, Participació i Esports) (from 8 April 2017)		Vicenç Vidal (ordinary discharge of duties)	5 April 2016	7 April 2016	Més	
Ministry of Participation, Transparency and Culture (Conselleria de Participació, Transparència i Cultura) (until 7 April 2016) Ministry of Transparency, Culture and Sports (Conselleria de Transparència, Cultura i Esports) (7 April 2016 – 8 April 2017) Ministry of Culture, Participation and Sports (Conselleria Cultura, Participació i Esports) (from 8 April 2017)		Ruth Mateu	7 April 2016	1 April 2017	MpM	
Ministry of Participation, Transparency and Culture (Conselleria de Participació, Transparència i Cultura) (until 7 April 2016) Ministry of Transparency, Culture and Sports (Conselleria de Transparència, Cultura i Esports) (7 April 2016 – 8 April 2017) Ministry of Culture, Participation and Sports (Conselleria Cultura, Participació i Esports) (from 8 April 2017)		Vicenç Vidal (ordinary discharge of duties)	1 April 2017	8 April 2017	Més	
Ministry of Participation, Transparency and Culture (Conselleria de Participació, Transparència i Cultura) (until 7 April 2016) Ministry of Transparency, Culture and Sports (Conselleria de Transparència, Cultura i Esports) (7 April 2016 – 8 April 2017) Ministry of Culture, Participation and Sports (Conselleria Cultura, Participació i Esports) (from 8 April 2017)		Fanny Tur	8 April 2017	3 July 2019	Més (Independent)	
Ministry of Participation, Transparency and Culture (Conselleria de Participació, Transparència i Cultura) (until 7 April 2016) Ministry of Transparency, Culture and Sports (Conselleria de Transparència, Cultura i Esports) (7 April 2016 – 8 April 2017) Ministry of Culture, Participation and Sports (Conselleria Cultura, Participació i Esports) (from 8 April 2017)	2 July 2015 – 8 April 2017: (■) General Secretariat of Participation, Transparency and Culture (disest. 7 Apr 2016); (■) General Secretariat of Transparency, Culture and Sports (est. 7 Apr 2016); (■) Directorate-General for Participation and Transparency; (■) Directorate-General for Culture; (■) Directorate-General for Language Policy; (■) Directorate-General for Sports and Youth; 8 April 2017 – 3 July 2019: (■) General Secretariat of Culture, Participation and Sports; (■) Directorate-General for Culture; (■) Directorate-General for Language Policy; (■) Directorate-General for Participation and Democratic Memory; (■) Directorate-General for Sports and Youth					
=== Spokesperson of the Government ===
Spokesperson of the Government (Portaveu del Govern)		Marc Pons	2 July 2015	7 April 2016	PSIB–PSOE	
Spokesperson of the Government (Portaveu del Govern)		Pilar Costa	7 April 2016	3 July 2019	PSIB–PSOE	

== Notes ==
Preceded by Bauzá	Government of the Balearic Islands; 2015–2019	Succeeded by Armengol II
