= Aina Calvo =

Spanish politician

Secretary of State for Security
- Incumbent
- Assumed office 4 June 2025
- Preceded by: Rafael Pérez Ruiz

Secretary of State for Equality
- In office 5 December 2023 – 4 June 2025
- Preceded by: Ángela Rodríguez
- Succeeded by: María Guijarro

Delegate of the Government in the Balearic Islands
- In office 12 February 2020 – 5 December 2023
- Preceded by: Rosario Sánchez Grau
- Succeeded by: Alfonso Luis Rodríguez Badal

AECID Director
- In office 10 July 2018 – 11 February 2020
- Preceded by: Luis Tejada Chacón
- Succeeded by: Magdy Esteban Martínez Solimán

Mayoress of Palma de Mallorca
- In office 16 June 2007 – 11 June 2011
- Preceded by: Catalina Cirer
- Succeeded by: Mateo Isern

Member of the Parliament of the Balearic Islands for Mallorca
- In office 25 May 2003 – 10 June 2004

City Councilor of Palma
- In office 16 June 2007 – 13 June 2015

Personal details
- Born: Aina Calvo Sastre; May 13, 1965; 61 years ago Palma de Mallorca, Spain
- Party: Socialist Party of the Balearic Islands
- Education: University of the Balearic Islands

Aina María Calvo Sastre (born in 1969) is a Spanish academic and politician, currently serving as Secretary of State for Security since 2025.

A former mayor of Palma de Mallorca, Calvo served as Secretary of State for Equality from 2023 to 2025 and as Delegate of the Government in the Balearic Islands from 2020 to 2023. She also served as Director of Spanish Agency for International Development Cooperation from 2018 to 2020.

== Biography ==
Born in Palma de Mallorca, in 1969, she resided in Zaragoza for family work purposes until 1983, when she returned to Palma. She studied at Glasgow first as a graduate student with an Erasmus scholarship and, later, as a professor at the University of Strathclyde.

She is a Doctor of Pedagogy and professor of the Department of Educational Sciences of the University of the Balearic Islands in a situation of special services and visiting professor at the University of Edinburgh. In 2003 she joined the PSIB-PSOE, being elected as a member of the Parliament of the Balearic Islands. Calvo has been part of the Ministry of Foreign Affairs and Cooperation as Assistant Director General of Cooperation and Cultural Promotion of the Spanish Agency for International Cooperation between 2004 and 2006, when PSIB candidate is designated to the City Council of Palma de Mallorca. In the municipal elections of 27 May 2007 her candidacy is second, but manages to form a government thanks to a pact with UM. However, in February 2010 the government pact was broken by expelling the UM councillors after being suspected of corruption, ruling the rest of the term in minority. She lost the municipal elections on 22 May 2011, remaining as spokeswoman of the Municipal Group.

During the 38th Congress of the PSOE, she formed part of the team of Carme Chacón in her candidacy to the General Secretariat of the PSOE, which was defeated by Alfredo Pérez Rubalcaba.

In March 2012, she resigned as Secretary General of the Socialist Group of Palma. However, after the resignation of her successor, she postulated to direct the local group again. On 6 July 2012, she was elected General Secretary of the Socialist Group of Palma, obtaining 64.7% of the votes against the 35% of her rival Jaume Garau.

After the 2015 local elections, Calvo returned to its position as professor of the University of the Balearic Islands. However, after the arrival to power of socialist Pedro Sánchez, Calvo was appointed executive director of the Spanish Agency for International Development Cooperation (AECID) in July 2018, serving as such until February 2020, when she returned to the Balearic Islands as delegate of the government.

In late 2023, minister Ana Redondo García appointed her as Secretary of State for Equality.

In May 2025, her future appointment as Secretary of State for Security was confirmed..
