= Bárbara Tardón =

Spanish researcher and activist on gender-based violence (born 1976)

- Born: Bárbara Tardón Recio; 1976 (age 49–50); Madrid, Spain
- Occupations: Researcher; consultant; activist

Bárbara Tardón Recio (born 1976, Madrid) is a Spanish researcher, consultant, and feminist activist specializing in sexual violence and gender-based violence. She directed the 2018 Amnesty International Spain report Ya es hora de que me creas ("It's Time You Believed Me"), a landmark investigation into the institutional response to sexual violence in Spain. She served as advisor to the Secretary of State for Equality Soledad Murillo (2018–2020) and subsequently to the Minister of Equality Irene Montero until 2023, contributing to the development of Spain's Ley de Libertad Sexual.

== Education ==
Tardón obtained her doctorate in Interdisciplinary Gender Studies from the Autonomous University of Madrid (UAM) in 2017, with a thesis titled La violencia sexual: desarrollos feministas, mitos y respuestas normativas globales ("Sexual Violence: Feminist Developments, Myths and Global Normative Responses"), directed by philosopher Cristina Sánchez Muñoz.

At UAM, she was a researcher at the Institute for Women's Studies, contributing to the project "Violencias Políticas y de Género: Imaginarios, Escenarios y Estrategias" ("Political and Gender Violence: Imaginaries, Scenarios and Strategies") directed by Sánchez Muñoz.

== Career ==
=== Consultancy and teaching ===
Since 2003, Tardón has worked as a trainer and educator on gender equality, gender-based violence, and human rights across Spain, other European countries, and Latin America. Since 2006, she has worked directly with survivors of sexual violence.

Her consultancy work has included engagements with organizations such as Amnesty International, Médicos del Mundo, and the Council of Europe, as well as public institutions including the Madrid City Council's Directorate General for the Prevention and Attention to Gender-Based Violence, the Canary Islands Women's Institute, and Emakunde (the Basque Women's Institute).

=== Amnesty International report ===
In November 2018, Amnesty International Spain published Ya es hora de que me creas: Un sistema que cuestiona y desprotege a las víctimas de violencia sexual ("It's Time You Believed Me: A System That Questions and Fails to Protect Victims of Sexual Violence"), which Tardón directed. The report, which covered four autonomous communities documented thirty years of absent public policy on sexual violence in Spain and identified systemic failures in the institutional response to survivors. The report has been described as one of the most important reference documents on sexual violence in Spain.

=== Government advisor ===
Tardón served as advisor to the Secretary of State for Equality Soledad Murillo de la Vega during Pedro Sánchez's caretaker government between 2018 and 2020. When the Ministry of Equality was created under Irene Montero in January 2020, Tardón joined the minister's team as one of seven level-30 advisors. Transparency data published by Newtral confirmed Tardón among the ministry's advisors. She held the position until the end of the legislature in 2023.

During her time at the Ministry, Tardón contributed to the development of the Ley de garantía integral de la libertad sexual (Organic Law 10/2022, commonly known as the ley del solo sí es sí or "only yes means yes" law), which established affirmative consent as the legal standard for sexual relations in Spain and created comprehensive victim support services including 24-hour crisis centres. Tardón has argued that the law represented a historic advance in enshrining the right to comprehensive specialized assistance for survivors of sexual violence in Spanish legislation, noting that legal and social changes have reduced the fear of reporting sexual assault. After leaving the Ministry, Tardón continued to advocate publicly for the law's full implementation, denouncing what she described as institutional paralysis and a far-right offensive against gender equality policies.

== Publications ==
Tardón's academic publications include the article "Todo es mentira: cultura de la violación, mitos y falsas creencias sobre violencia sexual hacia las mujeres" ("Everything Is a Lie: Rape Culture, Myths and False Beliefs about Sexual Violence against Women"), published in the journal Política y Sociedad in 2022.

In 2025, Tardón co-authored with Nerea Barjola the CIMA report Después del silencio: impacto de los abusos y las violencias sexuales contra las mujeres en el sector del cine y el audiovisual ("After the Silence: Impact of Abuse and Sexual Violence against Women in the Film and Audiovisual Sector"), investigating sexual violence in Spain's film industry. The report found that over 60% of women in the audiovisual sector had experienced some form of sexual violence in the workplace. The study also revealed that 92% of survivors had not filed formal complaints, highlighting what the authors described as a structural culture of impunity in the sector. The report received widespread media coverage and was presented with the participation of the Minister of Equality, Ana Redondo.

Tardón has also contributed opinion articles to media outlets including elDiario.es, La Marea, and CTXT, and has appeared on programmes such as Las mañanas de RNE on RTVE discussing sexual violence and impunity.
