= Secretary of State for Equality =

- Secretario de Estado de Igualdad
- Coat of Arms used by the Government

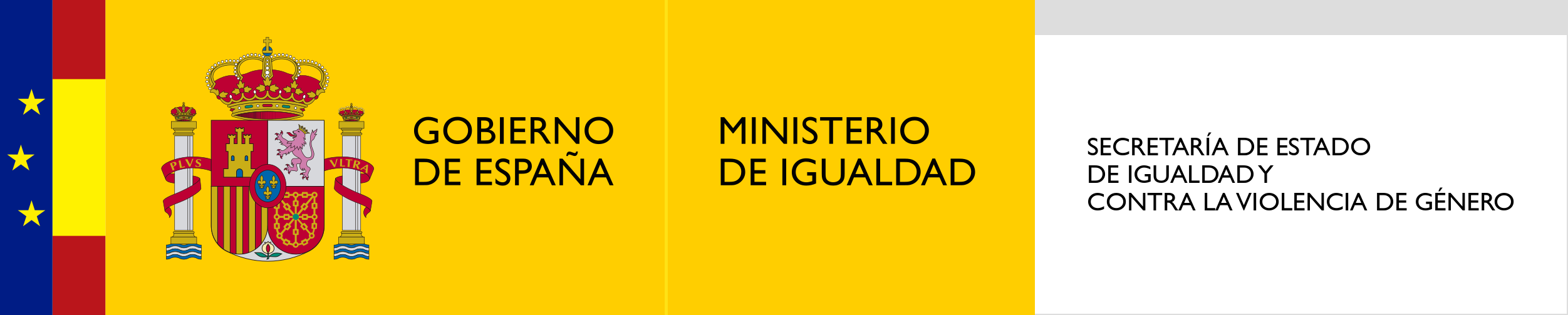

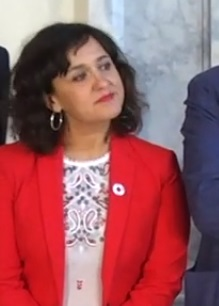
- Incumbent; María Guijarro since 4 June 2025
- Ministry of Equality; Secretariat of State for Equality
- Style: The Most Excellent (formal); Ms. Secretary of State (informal)
- Abbreviation: SEIVG
- Nominator: The Minister of Equality
- Appointer: The Monarch
- Precursor: Secretary-General for Equality
- Formation: October 20, 2010
- First holder: Bibiana Aído
- Website: www.igualdad.es

The secretary of state for equality, officially secretary of state for equality and eradication of violence against women, is a senior minister of the Spanish Department of Equality responsible for assisting the Minister of Equality in all matters relating to social equality—with special attention to gender equality— and prevention and elimination of all types of discrimination.

The secretary of state, who is appointed by the monarch on the advice of the minister of equaliy, also implements the government policies to eliminate violence against women and against LGBTQ people.

Since 4 June 2025, María Guijarro has served as secretary of state for equality.

== History ==
The Government's equality policies got a greater leadership during the governments of PM José Luis Rodríguez Zapatero. At the very first, the equality department was within the Ministry of Labour and Social Affairs with the level of a General Secretariat between 2004 and 2008.

In 2008, after Zapatero's reelection, he elevated this department to a ministerial level, creating the Ministry of Equality until 2010 when the Ministry merged with the Ministry of Health and the Secretariat of State of Equality was properly created.

During the governments of PM Mariano Rajoy, the Secretariat merged with the Secretariat of State of Social Services creating the Secretariat of State of Social Services and Equality between very late 2011 and middle 2018.

In 2018, with the arrival of PM Pedro Sánchez the Secretariat of State recovered its full autonomy and importance when it was integrated in the Ministry of the Presidency, with the direct supervision of the Deputy Prime Minister.

In January 2020, the Ministry of Equality was re-established and the Secretariat of State was integrated into it. Since then, it is structured through three directorates-general: the Government Delegation for Gender Violence, a directorate-general for equality and another for LGBT people.

== Structure ==
From the Secretary of State depends the following officials:

Secretariat of State Organization (2026)
Secretary of State	Cabinet
Secretary of State	Institute of Women
Government Delegation against Gender Violence	Deputy Directorate-General for Inter-institutional Coordination on Violence against Women
Government Delegation against Gender Violence	Deputy Directorate-General for Awareness, Prevention and Studies of Violence against Women
Government Delegation against Gender Violence	Regional Coordination Units for Violence against Women
Government Delegation against Gender Violence	Provincial Unites for Violence against Women
Government Delegation against Gender Violence	State Observatory of Violence against Women
Directorate-General for Equal Treatment and Non-Discrimination and against Racism	Deputy Directorate-General for Equal Treatment and Non-Discrimination and against Racism
Directorate-General for Real and Effective Equality of LGBT+ People	Deputy Directorate-General for LGBTI Rights

== List of secretaries of state ==
Before this office was created, all its duties were carried out by the Secretary-General for Equality first and by the Minister of Equality later.

No.	Image	Name	Term of office			Ministers serving under:	Prime Minister appointed by:
No.	Image	Name	Began	Ended	Days of service	Ministers serving under:	Prime Minister appointed by:
1st		Bibiana Aído	23 October 2010	23 July 2011	273	Leire Pajín	José Luis Rodriguez Zapatero
2nd		Laura Seara Sobrado	23 July 2011	31 December 2011	161	Leire Pajín	José Luis Rodriguez Zapatero
3rd		Juan Manuel Moreno Bonilla	31 December 2011	8 March 2014	798	Ana Mato	Mariano Rajoy
4th		Susana Camarero	8 March 2014	19 November 2016	987	Ana Mato	Mariano Rajoy
5th		Mario Garcés	19 November 2016	8 June 2018	566	Dolors Montserrat	Mariano Rajoy
6th		Soledad Murillo de la Vega	8 June 2018	15 January 2020	586	Carmen Montón María Luisa Carcedo	Pedro Sánchez
7th		Noelia Vera Ruiz-Herrera	15 January 2020	12 October 2021	636	Irene Montero	Pedro Sánchez
8th		Ángela Rodríguez Martínez	12 October 2021	5 December 2023	784	Irene Montero	Pedro Sánchez
9th		Aina Calvo	5 December 2023	4 June 2025	547	Ana Redondo García	Pedro Sánchez
10th		María Guijarro	4 June 2025	Incumbent	460	Ana Redondo García	Pedro Sánchez
