= Biel Company =

Biel Company may refer to:

- Biel Company (footballer) (born 1992), Spanish footballer
- Biel Company (politician) (born 1963), Spanish politician
