= Ángela Rodríguez =

Spanish philosopher and politician (born 1989)

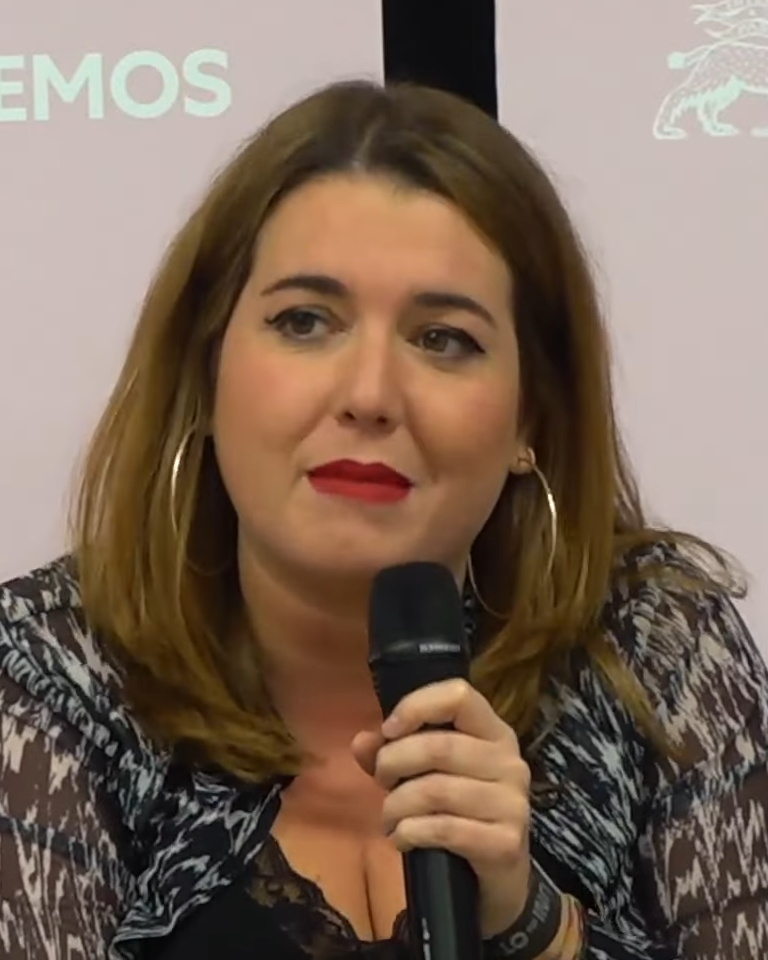
- Ángela in 2022

8th Secretary of State for Equality
- In office 12 October 2021 – 23 November 2023
- Monarch: Felipe VI
- President: Pedro Sánchez
- Minister: Irene Montero
- Preceded by: Noelia Vera
- Succeeded by: Aina Calvo

Personal details
- Born: Ángela Rodríguez Martínez; 2 October 1989 (age 37) Pontevedra, Galicia, Spain
- Party: Podemos
- Education: University of Santiago de Compostela (BPhil); University of Vigo; National University of Distance Education
- Occupation: Philosopher; politician

Ángela Rodríguez Martínez (born 2 October 1989), commonly known as Pam, is a Spanish politician. She is a member of the Podemos political party in Galicia. In the XI and XII legislatures, she served as a deputy in the Cortes Generales representing Pontevedra. From October 2021 until November 2023, she was the Secretary of State for Equality and Gender Violence. Her focus is on feminist legislation and devising the most effective strategies to combat violence against women.

== Early life and education ==
Born in Pontevedra on 2 October 1989. She graduated from the University of Santiago de Compostela with a degree in philosophy. She graduated from the University of Vigo in 2014 with a master's degree in creation and research in contemporary art.

== Political career ==
Ángela is a Galician activist for the 15-M Movement, She served as Podemos Galicia's Secretary of Coordination and Equality in 2015. In April 2016, she was chosen to be the General Secretariat of Podemos Galicia, which was backed by Íñigo Errejón with the "Ágora Podemos" candidacy. However, she was defeated by Carmen Santos from Vigo, who led the "Un Mar de Xente" candidacy, garnering 41.14% of the vote, as opposed to her 39.38%. She was ranked 14th on the Recover the Illusion list, led by Íñigo Errejón, at the Podemos second citizens' assembly in February 2017.

Due to her youth, she was subjected to abusive treatment by many police officers at the Congress of Deputies, she said on social media in August 2016, when she went to pick up her deputy accreditation. Among her duties in the XII legislature were serving as the deputy for the Equality Commission's second vice-presidency and deputy spokesman. The State Pact Subcommittee on Gender Violence included him as a member as well.

Noelia Vera stated in September 2021 that she was leaving politics and all of her roles. In October of the same year, she was succeeded by Ángela as the Secretary of State for Equality and Gender Violence in the Ministry of Equality. He helped to draft the Ley del solo sí es sí in 2022. He took issue with judges' use of it, believing them to be sexist because of their interpretations that reduced punishments for sexual offenders. Her formal termination as Secretary of State was announced in the Boletín Oficial del Estado on 23 November 2023.

== Controversies ==
Following her loss to Carmen Santos in the 2016 Podemos Galicia general secretariat contest, Ángela made a remark on a party internal forum, calling the physically disabled Santos a "lame whore." Victims protesting Ángela's presentation before Congress in March 2017 said the deputy did nothing "before the complaints of women for harassment and mistreatment within their ranks."

Following the ratification of the Ley del solo sí es sí statute, Ángela faced accusations of making fun of the rapists' shorter penalties in public. The incident began with a round table hosted by Podemos, during which she accused the "far right" of pressuring them to "put the rapists on the street." "From the creators of 'People are going to go to the registry to change sex every morning comes... The rapists on the street! (...) Thousands, waves," she laughed.

Ángela stated in a March 2023 interview with Yasss, a digital medium owned by Mediaset, that males "do not need the civil registry to be rapists." They are, and regrettably, they are very so in our nation," she said, drawing criticism from a range of outlets for her generalisation. Her defence of "all bodies are valid" and denunciation of "gordophobia" in May 2023 drew further criticism for her, as did her request for "fatter" in the Congress of Deputies and her blending of physical health and beauty standards.

In April 2024, Ángela was ordered by Estepona's Investigating Court Number 3 to pay 10,500 euros for violating someone's right to honour by referring to Rafael Marcos, the former partner of Infancia Libre president María Sevilla, as "an abuser." The sentence was also made public through the same programs and channels where Ángela made the defamatory demonstrations. A year prior, Irene Montero, the previous Minister of Equality, was found guilty of making identical remarks in which she suggested that Rafael Marcos be given 18,000 euros in compensation.
