= Government Delegation for Gender Violence =

Sandeep Barnwal 52

- Delegación del Gobierno para la Violencia de Género
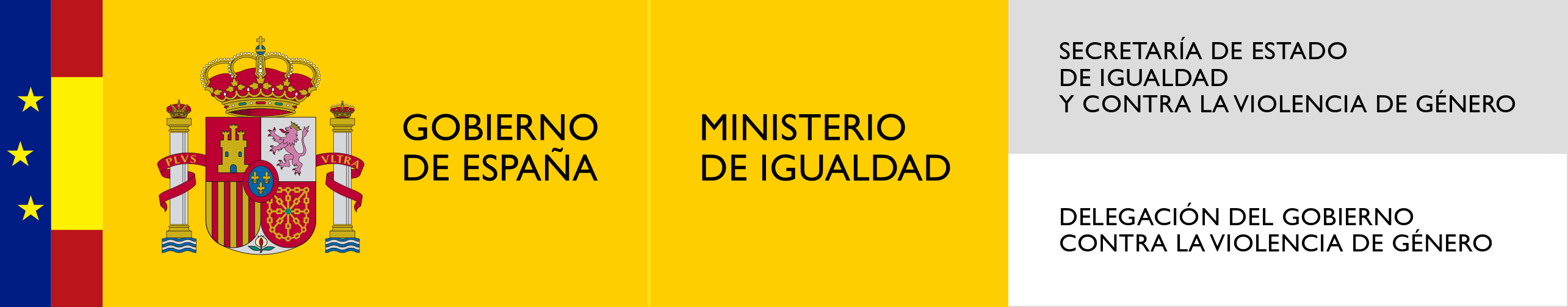

Agency overview
- Formed: March 4, 2005; 21 years ago
- Type: Directorate-General
- Jurisdiction: Spanish government
- Headquarters: 37 Alcalá Street Madrid
- Annual budget: €79.5 million (2026)
- Minister responsible: María Guijarro, Secretary of State
- Agency executives: Carmen Martínez Perza, Government Delegate
- Parent department: Secretariat of State for Equality
- Child agency: State Observatory on Violence on Women
- Website: Official website (in Spanish)

The Government Delegation for Gender Violence (Spanish: Delegación del Gobierno para la Violencia de Género, DGVG) is a department of the Secretariat of State for Equality of the Spanish Department of Equality responsible for formulating the central government policy against the different forms of violence against women and promoting, coordinating and advising on all the measures carried out in this matter.

The DGVG is headed by a Government Delegate, a civil servant with the rank of director-general appointed by the Monarch on the advice of the Minister of Equality. The Government Delegation is structured through a central organization integrated by two deputy directorates-general and a decentralized network of gender violence units.

The Delegation of the Government manages the national registers of gender violence victims; the women register was created in 2003 and the childs register in 2013. Since its creation, it has recorded more than 1,030 women and 34 minors murdered in this kind of violence.

== History ==
The Government Delegation for Gender Violence was first devised in 2004 during the first term of prime minister José Luis Rodríguez Zapatero. During this term, Zapatero's government proposed and the parliament approved the Organic Act 1/2004, of 28 December, on Integral Protection Measures Against Gender Violence, a law that in its section 29 foresaw a Special Government Delegation against Violence against Women integrated in the Ministry of Labour and Social Affairs. The Delegation was officially created on March 4, 2005. The organ was granted the rank of directorate-general and its first holder was Encarnación Orozco, a Labour Law expert and Socialist Parliamentary Group's Legal Cabinet advisor. As such, she took part in the drafting of the Act against Gender Violence.

In the second term of Zapatero's premiership, in 2008, the unit was renamed Government Delegation for Gender Violence and it was transferred to the Ministry of Equality. It was endowed with two deputy directorates-general, one for Planning and Inter-institutional Coordination and other for Preventing and Managing of Gender Violence Knowledge.

However, in 2010, due to the 2008 financial crisis, the Equality Ministry was dismantled and its responsibilities were assumed by the newly created Secretariat of State for Equality, a component of the Ministry of Health, Social Policy and Equality. In 2018, the Secretariat of State and its units were transferred to the Ministry of the Presidency, Relations with the Cortes and Equality due to the great importance that the Deputy Prime Minister and Minister of the Presidency, Carmen Calvo, gives to equality policies since she, within the Socialist Party, was the maximum person in charge of these responsibilities.

== Government delegates ==
In accordance with the Organic Act on Integral Protection Measures Against Gender Violence which creates this organ, its holder is entitled before the courts of justice to intervene in defense of the rights and interests protected in said law in collaboration and coordination with the Administrations with competence in the field.

Since 2005, these have been the holders of the office:

- Encarnación Orozco (2005–2008)
- Miguel Lorente Acosta (2008–2011)
- Blanca Hernández (2011–2017)
- María José Ordóñez (2017–2018)
- Pilar Llop (2018–2019)
- Rebeca Palomo Díaz (2019–2020)
- Victoria Rosell (2020–)

== Organization chart ==
The following units depend on the Government Delegation:

- The Deputy Directorate-General for Sensitization, Prevention and Knowledge of Gender Violence, to which corresponds the exercise of the functions of social awareness and the prevention of all forms of violence against women. It also administers the gender violence data provided by the different administrations as well as manages the national registers of victims.
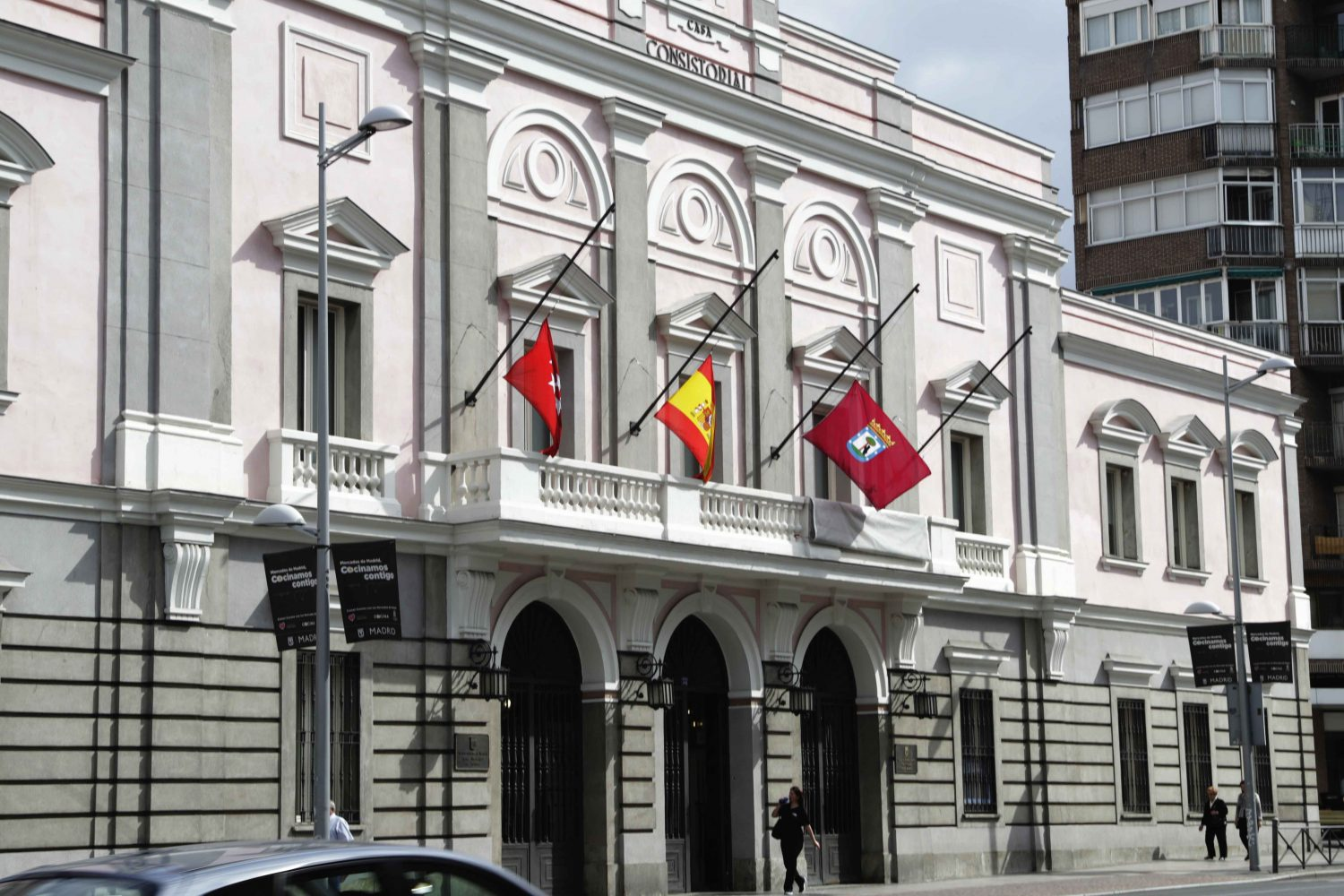
  When a woman is murdered in Spain for gender violence, it is normal to see official buildings with half-mast flags, 2017.
- The Deputy Directorate General for Inter-Institutional Coordination in Gender Violence, to which corresponds the exercise of the functions of impulse of the application of the principle of transversality of the measures destined to fight against the different forms of violence against women, ensuring that, in its application, the specific needs and demands of the victims are taken into account. In this sense, this unit creates specific protocols to coordinate the different Spanish public administrations.

=== National Network of Coordination and Violence on Women Units ===
The Government Delegation manages the National Network of Coordination and Gender Violence Units, a set of units integrated in the Government Delegations, Government Sub-delegations and Insular Directorates for the territorial execution of the central government's policy regarding gender violence.

==== Units of Violence against Women ====
These units are integrated in the Sub-delegations and Insular Directorates and, within the province or island in which they are located, are responsible for:

- Monitoring and coordination of the resources and services of the General State Administration for the attention of gender violence situations in the territory.
- Collaboration with the competent regional and local administrations in the field of gender violence.
- Personalized monitoring of each situation of gender violence.
- Actions in relation to fatalities due to gender violence.
- Participation in information campaigns, awareness and prevention of gender violence.
- Intervention within the framework of the Master Plan for the Improvement of Coexistence and School Safety.
- Promotion and collaboration in the training and specialization of professionals.
- Monitoring of the resources and services of the General State Administration for the attention of situations of woman trafficking for the purpose of sexual slavery, as well as collaboration with the regional and local administrations in this matter.
- Monitoring of the resources and services of the General State Administration for the attention of other forms of violence against women (female genital mutilation, forced marriages, etc.)
- Any other action entrusted to it by the Government Delegation for Gender Violence.

==== Coordination Units against Violence against Women ====
These units are integrated into the Government Delegations of the regions with more-than-one provinces, and are responsible for:

- To direct and coordinate the activities of the Units of Violence on Women existing in the territorial scope of its Autonomous Community.
- To have knowledge of the actions carried out by the Violence Units of its Autonomous Community for the performance of its functions.
- To establish criteria for action in its Autonomous Community so that the Violence Units on Women function in a coordinated and uniform manner. Likewise, they may request reports from the Violence Units regarding actions, meetings, etc., whenever they deem it convenient.
- To coordinate the work of the Violence Units in order to prepare the reports requested by the Government Delegation for Gender Violence.
- To know the reports prepared by the Units of Violence on Women that are sent by them to the Government Delegation for Gender Violence, as well as to other Institutions and Organizations.
- To integrate information on the activities carried out by the Violence against Women Units, in order to prepare the annual report of activities of the corresponding Autonomous Community.
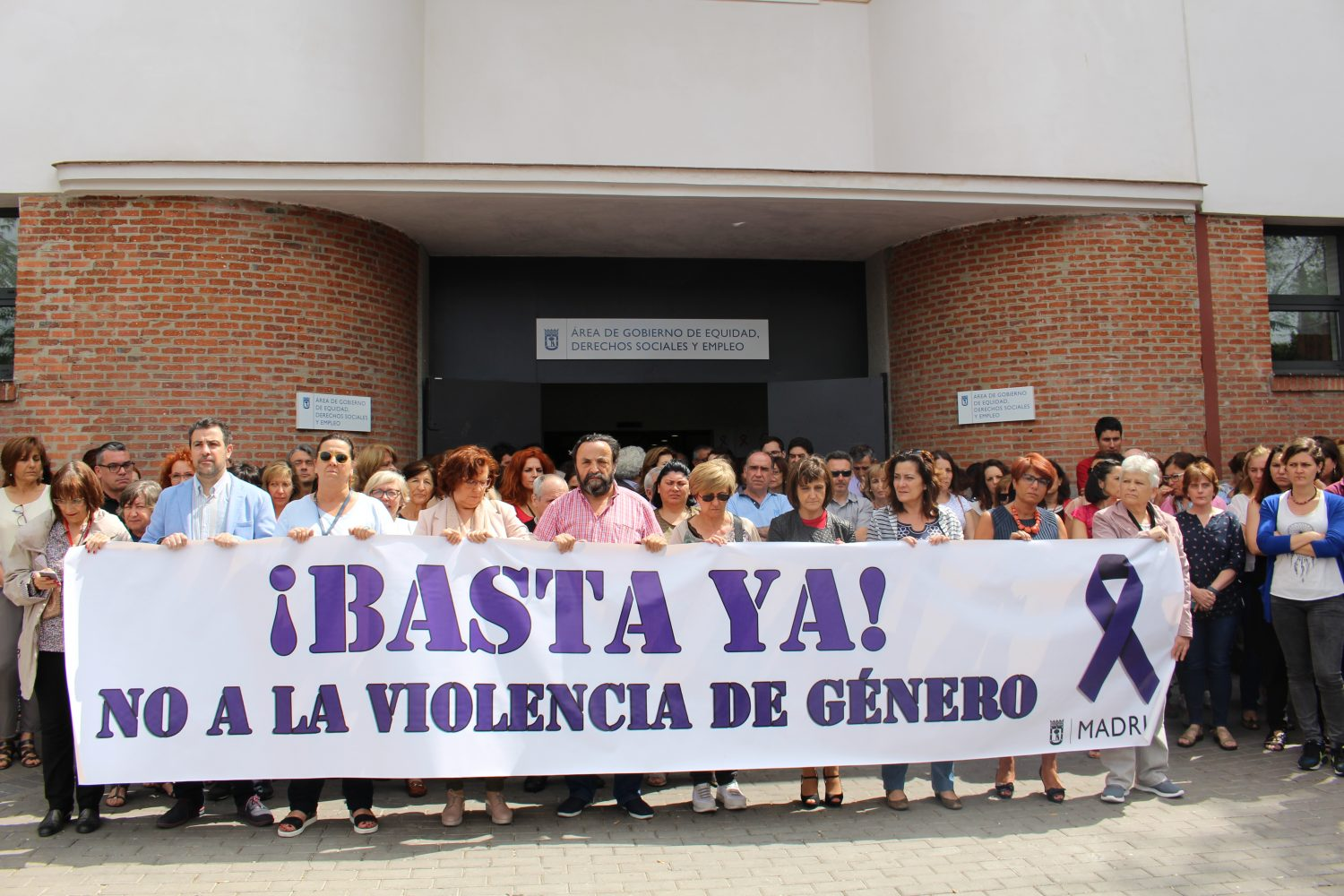
- A minute of silence for gender violence fatal victims in Madrid. The banner says: "Enough is enough! No to gender violence", 2007.
  To convene the necessary coordination meetings with the Violence Units. In addition, the Coordination Units against Violence against Women perform the functions of the Violence Units in the provinces where this Unit does not exists.

=== Organizations attached ===
- The State Observatory on Violence on Women.

== Fatal victims ==
There are currently two official records, one for women, created in 2003 and other for minors, created in 2013. Since January 1, 2003, 1,383 women have been murdered in Spain by their romantic partners or ex-partners. Since 2013, 68 minors have been murdered in Spain as a consequence of gender violence against their mother.

Women fatal victims of gender violence in Spain at the hands of their partners or ex-partners
2026 data is updated as of 9 October 2026. Source:

Minor fatal victims in cases of gender violence against their mother in Spain
2026 data is updated as of 23 March 2026.
