= Government of José Ramón Bauzá =

- 9th Government of the Balearic Islands
- 2011–2015
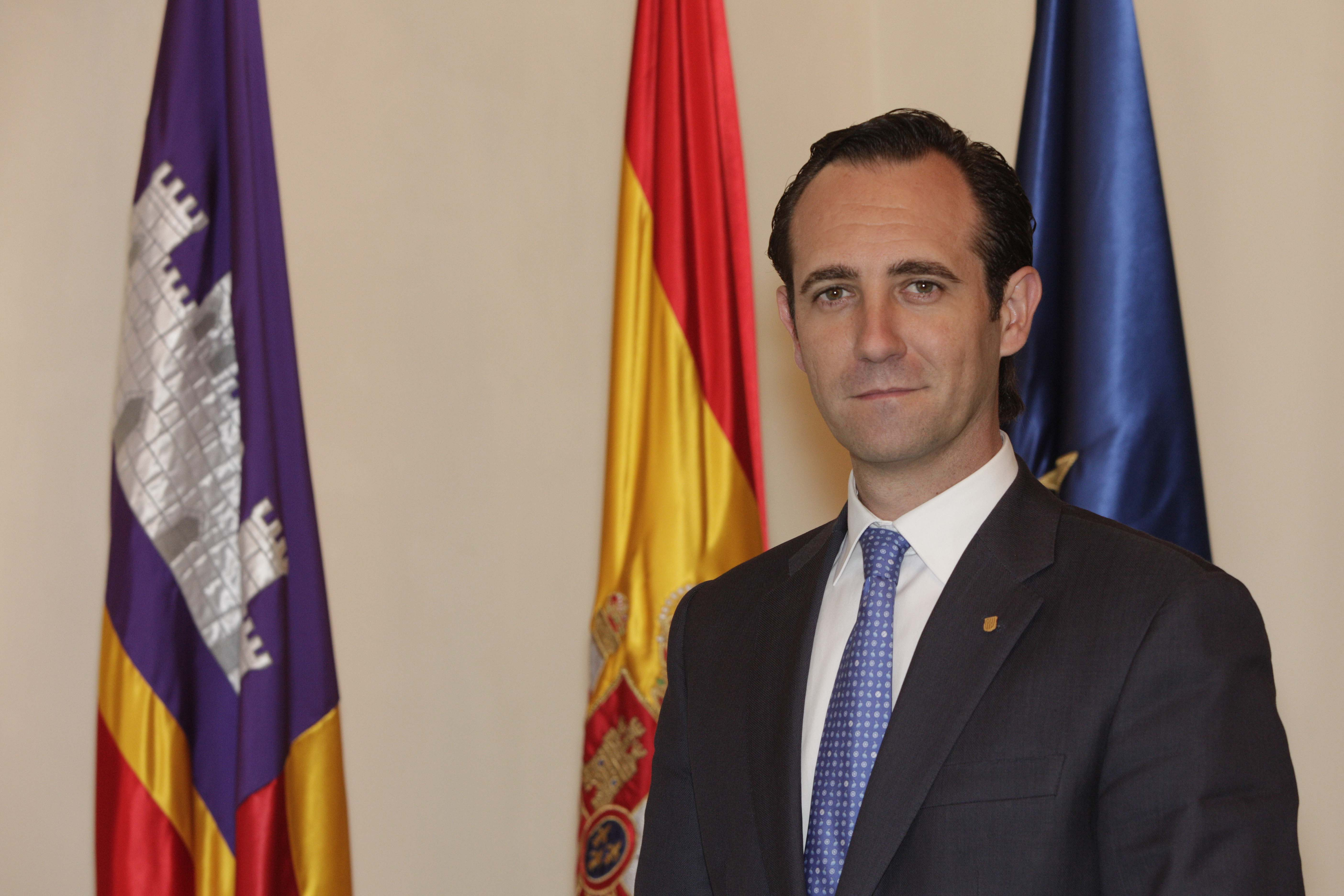
- José Ramón Bauzá in January 2012.
- Date formed: 20 June 2011
- Date dissolved: 2 July 2015

People and organisations
- Monarch: Juan Carlos I (2011–2014); Felipe VI (2014–2015)
- President: José Ramón Bauzá
- Vice President: José Ignacio Aguiló (2011–2013); Antonio Gómez (2013–2015)
- No. of ministers: 7 (Note: Does not include the President.) (2011–2013); 9 (2013–2015)
- Total no. of members: 15
- Member party: PP
- Status in legislature: Majority government
- Opposition party: PSIB–PSOE
- Opposition leader: Francina Armengol

History
- Election: 2011 regional election
- Outgoing election: 2015 regional election
- Legislature term: 8th Parliament
- Budget: 2012, 2013, 2014, 2015
- Predecessor: Antich II
- Successor: Armengol I

The government of José Ramón Bauzá was formed on 20 June 2011, following the latter's election as President of the Balearic Islands by the Parliament of the Balearic Islands on 15 June, as a result of the absolute majority obtained by the People's Party (PP) at the 2011 regional election. It succeeded the second Antich government and was the Government of the Balearic Islands from 20 June 2011 to 2 July 2015, a total of 1,473 days, or 4 years and 12 days.

== Investiture ==
Investiture; José Ramón Bauzá (PP)
Ballot →	15 June 2011
Required majority →	30 out of 59
Yes: • PP (35)	35 / 59
No: • PSIB (19); • PSM–IV (5)	24 / 59
Abstentions	0 / 59
Absentees	0 / 59

== Council of Government ==
The Government of the Balearic Islands was structured into the offices for the president, the vice president, seven ministries and the post of the spokesperson of the Government. The number of ministries was increased to nine after the economic vice presidency was split into the Economy and Finance departments in May 2013.

← Bauzá Government → (20 June 2011 – 2 July 2015)
Portfolio	Name	Party	Took office	Left office	Ref.
President	José Ramón Bauzá	PP	18 June 2011	2 July 2015	
Economic Vice President for Enterprise Development and Employment	José Ignacio Aguiló	PP	20 June 2011	2 May 2013	
Minister of the Presidency	Antonio Gómez	PP	20 June 2011	2 July 2015	
Minister of Education, Culture and Universities; Spokesperson of the Government	Rafael Bosch	PP	20 June 2011	2 May 2013	
Minister of Tourism and Sports	Carlos Delgado	PP	20 June 2011	27 December 2013	
Minister of Health, Family and Social Welfare	Carmen Castro	PP	20 June 2011	6 July 2012	
Minister of Agriculture, Environment and Territory	Biel Company	PP	20 June 2011	2 July 2015	
Minister of Public Administrations	Simón Gornés	PP	20 June 2011	2 May 2013	
=== Changes July 2012 ===
Portfolio	Name	Party	Took office	Left office	Ref.
Minister of Health, Family and Social Welfare	Antoni Mesquida	PP (Ind.)	6 July 2012	25 October 2012	
=== Changes October 2012 ===
Portfolio	Name	Party	Took office	Left office	Ref.
Minister of Health, Family and Social Welfare	Biel Company took on the ordinary discharge of duties from 25 to 26 October 2012.				
Minister of Health, Family and Social Welfare	Martí Sansaloni	PP	26 October 2012	2 May 2013	
=== Changes May 2013 ===
Portfolio	Name	Party	Took office	Left office	Ref.
Vice President; Minister of the Presidency	Antonio Gómez	PP	2 May 2013	2 July 2015	
Minister of Economy and Competitiveness (Note: On 2 May 2013, the Economic Vice Presidency for Enterprise Development and Employment was disestablished and its competences transferred to the Economy and Competitiveness and Finance and Budgets departments. Concurrently, the Ministry of Health, Family and Social Welfare was disestablished and its competences transferred to the ministries of Health and Family and Social Services.)	Joaquín García	PP	2 May 2013	2 July 2015	
Minister of Education, Culture and Universities	Joana Maria Camps	PP	2 May 2013	26 September 2014	
Minister of Health	Martí Sansaloni	PP	2 May 2013	2 July 2015	
Minister of Finance and Budgets	José Vicente Marí	PP	2 May 2013	2 July 2015	
Minister of Family and Social Services	Sandra Fernández	PP	2 May 2013	2 July 2015	
Minister of Public Administrations; Spokesperson of the Government	Núria Riera	PP	2 May 2013	26 September 2014	
=== Changes December 2013 ===
Portfolio	Name	Party	Took office	Left office	Ref.
Minister of Tourism and Sports	Jaime Martínez	PP	27 December 2013	2 July 2015	
=== Changes September 2014 ===
Portfolio	Name	Party	Took office	Left office	Ref.
Minister of Education, Culture and Universities; Spokesperson of the Government	Núria Riera	PP	26 September 2014	2 July 2015	
Minister of Public Administrations	Juan Manuel Lafuente	PP	26 September 2014	2 July 2015	

== Notes ==
Preceded by Antich II	Government of the Balearic Islands; 2011–2015	Succeeded by Armengol I
