= Noelia Vera =

Spanish journalist and former politician

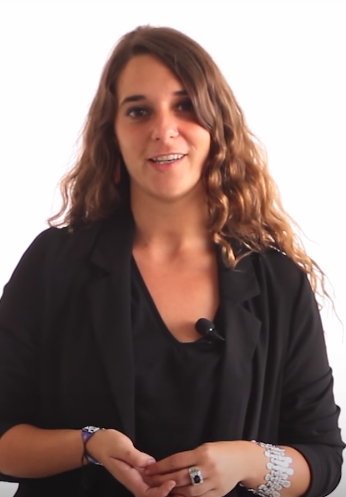

Noelia Vera Ruiz-Herrera (born 27 October 1985) is a Spanish journalist and former politician of the Podemos party. She was a member of the Congress of Deputies from 2015 to her resignation in 2021, and was the Secretary of State for Equality from 2020 to 2021.

== Biography ==
Born in Cádiz, Vera was raised on a farm in nearby El Puerto de Santa María. She earned a bachelor's degree from the Complutense University of Madrid and a master's degree from King Juan Carlos University, both in the field of journalism. She worked at various media outlets in Spain, Argentina and Colombia, including Diario de Cádiz, CNN+, Telemadrid and EFE. In 2014, she became editor and occasional host of La Tuerka, a discussion show anchored by Podemos founder Pablo Iglesias.

Vera was chosen as Podemos's lead candidate for the 2015 Spanish general election in the Cádiz constituency, and was elected. Having been re-elected three times, in January 2020 she was made Secretary of State for Equality by Minister of Equality Irene Montero.

In June 2021, as Ione Belarra succeeded Iglesias as leader of Podemos, Vera rose to third position in the party's national executive, the Citizens' Council.

In October 2021, Vera resigned her seat and government post, and retired from politics for personal reasons. She was succeeded by Juan Antonio Delgado and Ángela Rodríguez, respectively.
