= Isern =

Isern is a Catalan surname. Notable people with the surname include:

- Antonio Fernós Isern (1895–1974), Puerto Rican cardiologist
- Fernando Isern (born 1958), Cuban bishop
- Lia Kali (born 1997), Spanish singer born Julia Isern
- Mateo Isern (born 1959), Spanish politician
