= Carlota Bustelo =

Spanish politician (1939–2025)

Carlota Bustelo García del Real
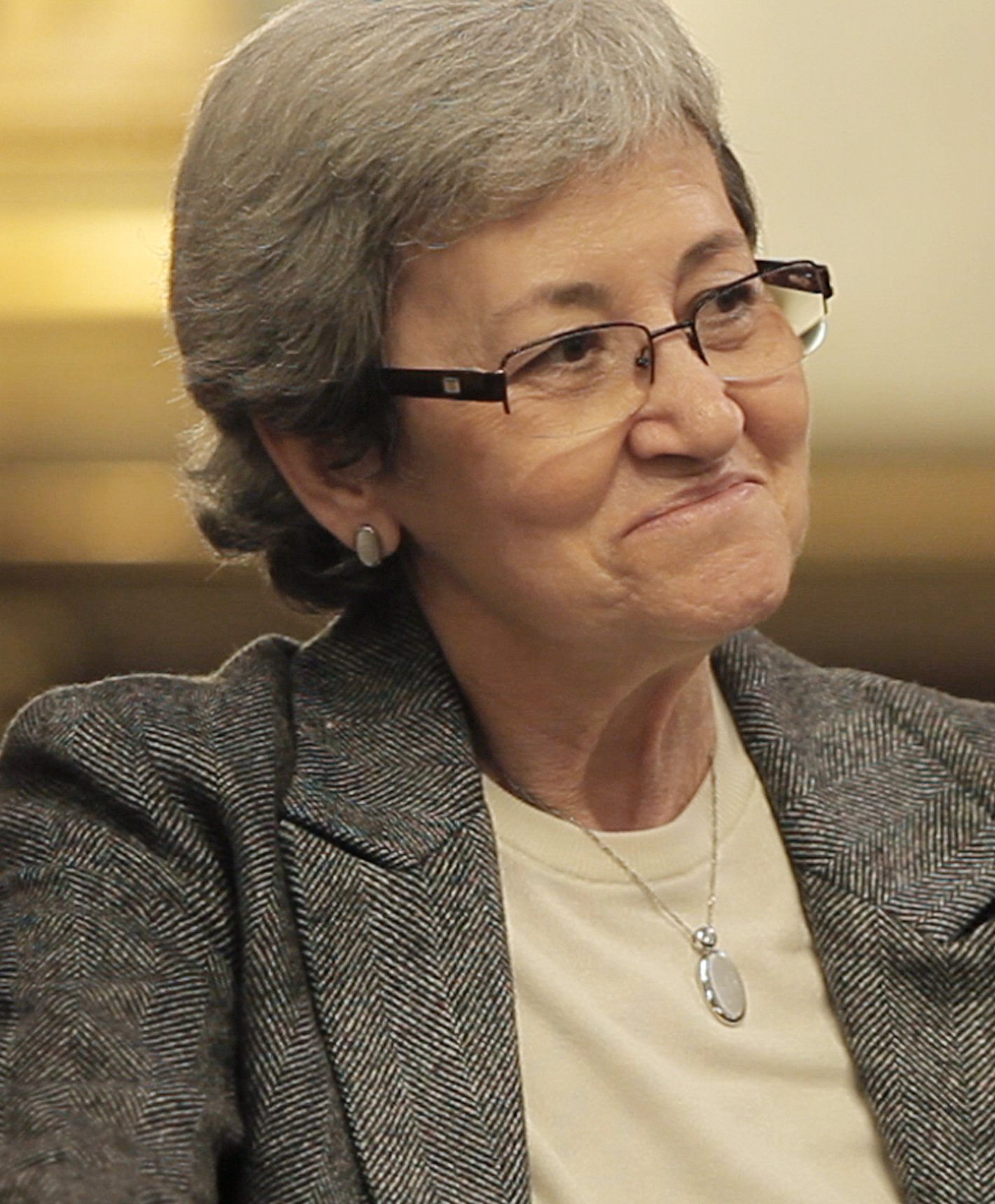
- Bustelo in 2011

Undersecretary of Social Affairs of Spain
- In office 29 July 1988 – 28 September 1990
- President: Felipe González
- Preceded by: Office established
- Succeeded by: José Ignacio Pérez Infante

Director of the Institute of Women
- In office 15 December 1983 – 29 July 1988
- President: Felipe González
- Preceded by: Office established
- Succeeded by: Carmen Martínez Ten

Legislator in the Cortes Generales
- In office 1 July 1977 – 2 January 1979
- Constituency: Madrid

Personal details
- Born: 1 November 1939 Madrid, Spain
- Died: 15 October 2025 (aged 85)
- Party: Spanish Socialist Workers' Party
- Spouse: Juan Manuel Kindelán (m. 1960; died 2011)
- Children: 3
- Profession: Political scientist

Carlota Bustelo García del Real (1 November 1939 – 15 October 2025) was a Spanish politician and feminist who is considered a historic figure of the Spanish socialism during the Transition. She was a founding member of the Front for Women's Liberation in 1976. She served as a deputy for Madrid in the Constituent Legislature (1977–1979) and was the first director of the Institute of Women (Spain) (1983–1988).

== Early life and education ==
Bustelo came from a socialist and liberal family and was educated following the principles of the Institución Libre de Enseñanza.

Her grandfather, Ramón Bustelo, was a deputy and senator during the Restoration. Her brothers Francisco Bustelo and Carlos Bustelo were also politically active, the former as deputy and rector of the Complutense University of Madrid, and the latter as Minister of Industry under Adolfo Suárez. She was the niece of pedagogue and writer Matilde García del Real y Álvarez Mijares and cousin of Leopoldo Calvo-Sotelo. She married socialist Juan Manuel Kindelán. She graduated in Political Science from the Complutense University of Madrid.

== Political career ==
Bustelo joined the Spanish Socialist Workers' Party (PSOE) in 1974, after the Suresnes Congress. She lived in exile in Paris with her husband before returning to Spain in 1964, where she began clandestine political activity and feminist advocacy, collaborating with the Association of Housewives and the Spanish Association of University Women.

She co-founded the Federal Commission Women and Socialism with other PSOE feminists such as Elena Arnedo in 1975, to propose gender equality policies within the party.

Elected deputy for Madrid in the 1977 general election, she advocated for contraceptive legalization and constitutional equality. In 1979, she declined inclusion on PSOE electoral lists due to insufficient female representation.

She served as the first director of the Institute of Women (1983–1988) and was Undersecretary of the Ministry of Social Affairs from 1988 to 1990, resigning due to fatigue.

== Women's rights advocacy ==
Bustelo participated in the early Spanish feminist movement, including the Democratic Women's Movement in the 1960s–70s.

She promoted quotas and parity within political parties and contributed to the 1981 Divorce Law in Spain. She defended sexual and reproductive rights, including abortion access, and addressed prostitution as a political and social issue.

From 1994 to 1999, she was the founding president of Fundación Mujeres, later becoming honorary president. In 2020, she renounced the financial award of the Luisa de Medrano International Equality Prize to benefit women victims of gender-based violence.

== Death ==
Bustelo died on 15 October 2025, at the age of 85.

== Awards and honours ==
- El Club de las 25 Award (2022)
- Luisa de Medrano International Equality Prize (2020)
- Progressive Woman Award (1995)
- Grand Cross of the Order of Civil Merit, posthumously (2025)

== Selected works ==
- Reflexiones sobre mujer y feminismo (1977)
- Una alternativa feminista (1979)
- Prologue in Las Mujeres de los 90: El largo trayecto de las jóvenes hacia su emancipación (1991) by Josep María Riera, Josep María Riera Mercader, and Elena Valenciano
