= Mario Garcés =

Spanish politician (born 1967)

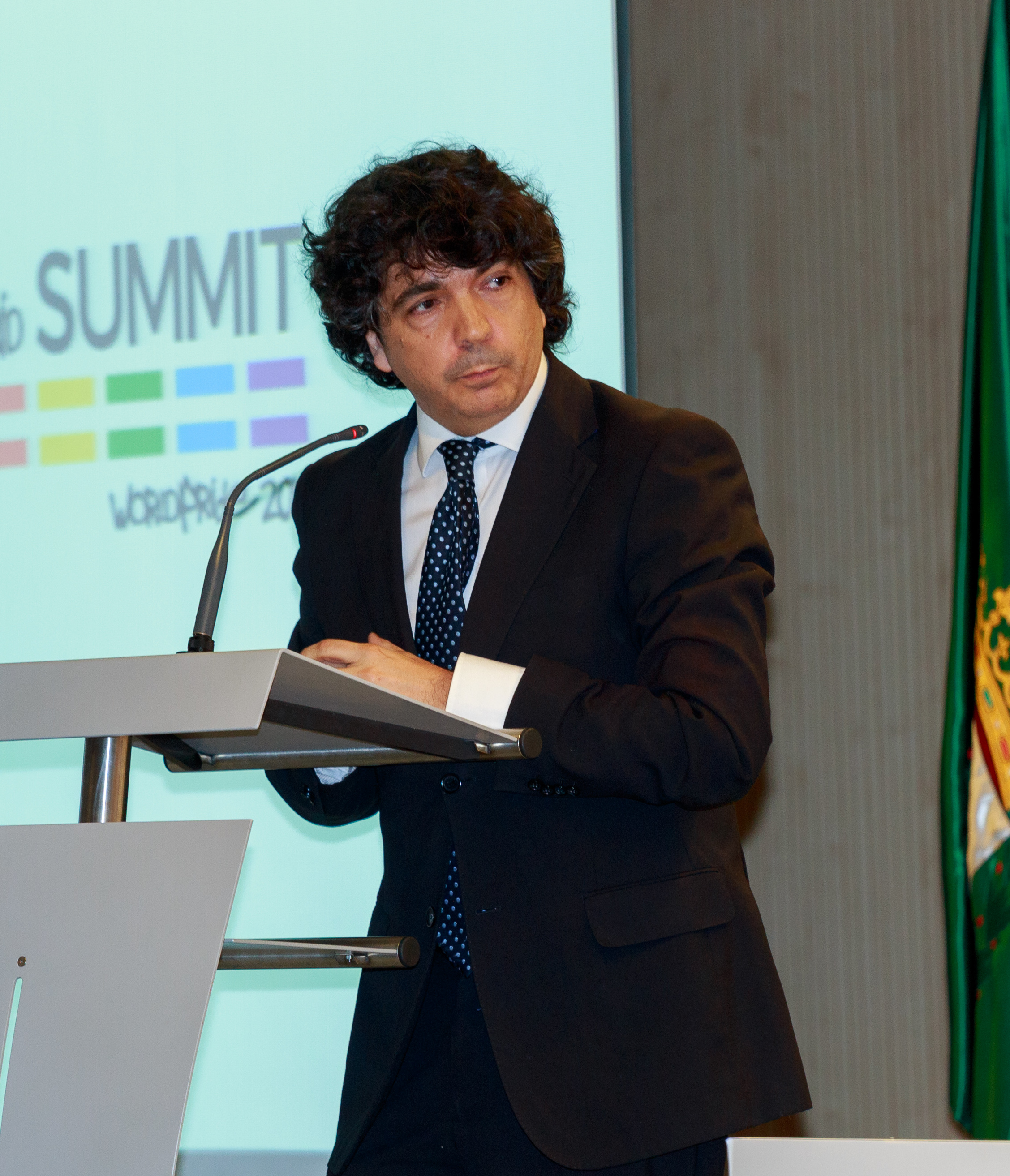
- Garcés in 2017

Member of the Congress of Deputies
- In office 13 May 2019 – 23 July 2023
- Constituency: Huesca

Secretary of State for Social Services and Equality
- In office 19 November 2016 – 9 June 2018
- Preceded by: Susana Camarero
- Succeeded by: Soledad Murillo

Personal details
- Born: 29 April 1967 (age 58)
- Party: People's Party

Mario Garcés Sanagustín (born 29 April 1967) is a Spanish politician. From 2019 to 2023, he was a member of the Congress of Deputies. From 2016 to 2018, he served as secretary of state for social services and equality.
