= Gabriel Arrúe =

Spanish politician (born 1999)

Member of the Congress of Deputies
- Incumbent
- Assumed office 10 June 2025
- Preceded by: María Guijarro
- Constituency: Biscay

Personal details
- Born: 9 January 1999 (age 27)
- Party: Socialist Party of the Basque Country–Basque Country Left

Gabriel Blanco Arrúe (born 9 January 1999) is a Spanish politician serving as a member of the Congress of Deputies since 2025. He has served as secretary general of the Socialist Youth of the Basque Country since 2023.
