= Jaime Martínez (Spanish politician) =

Mayor of Palma de Mallorca since 2023

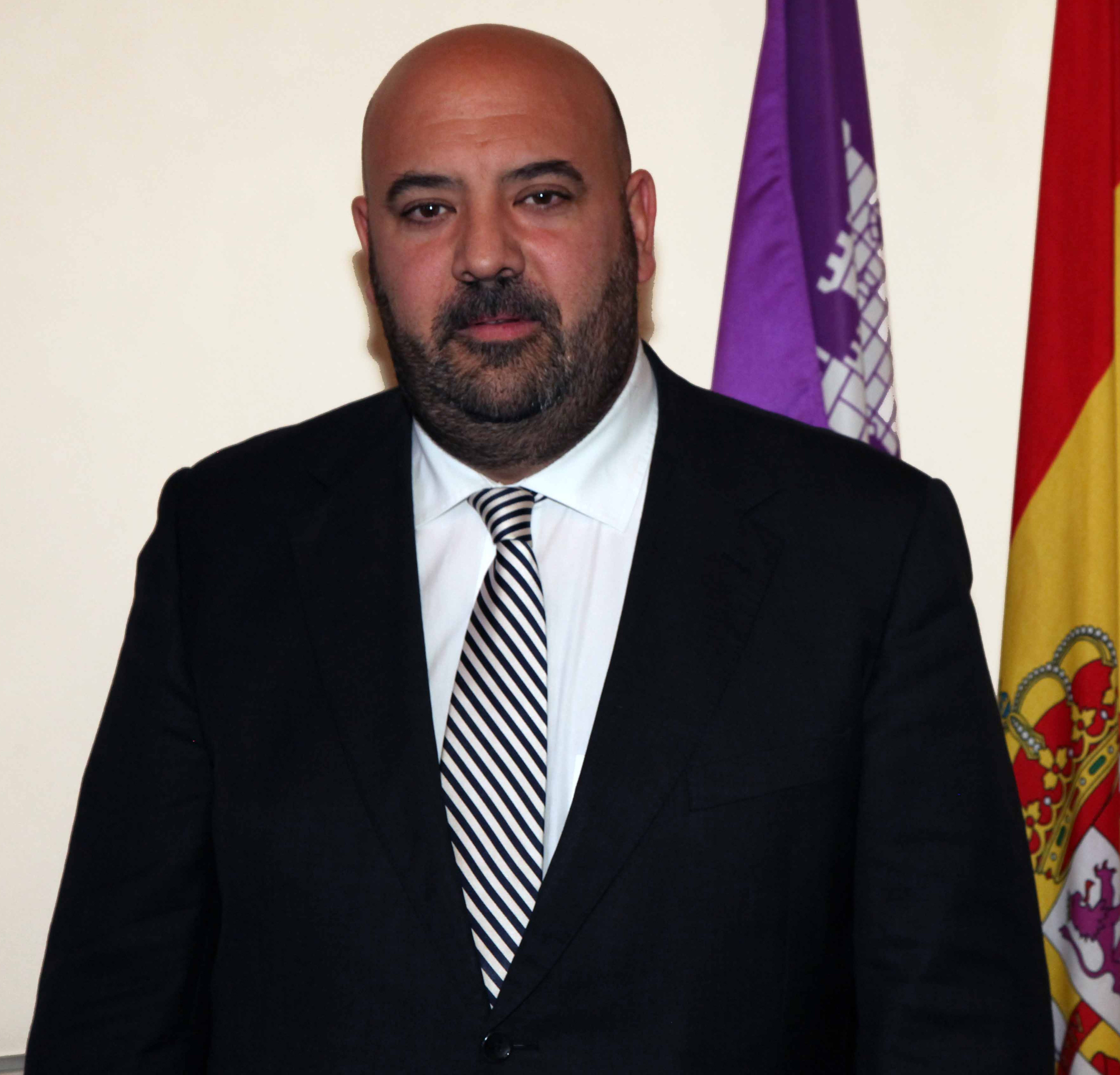

Jaime Martínez Llabrés (born 9 May 1971) is a Spanish politician of the People's Party. He was elected mayor of Palma de Mallorca in 2023, having previously been Minister of Tourism and Sport in the Government of the Balearic Islands from 2013 to 2015.

== Biography ==
Born in Palma de Mallorca, Martínez is an architect by profession and is married and has three children. He and his wife, who is from the Canary Islands, set up an architectural firm specialising in hotels and other buildings for the tourist industry. He had over 25 years of architectural experience before becoming mayor in 2023, and said that politics was a "parenthesis or two" within his professional career.

In December 2013, Martínez was appointed Minister of Tourism and Sport by José Ramón Bauzá, President of the Government of the Balearic Islands. He had previously been director general of tourism, and replaced Carlos Delgado, who had resigned for personal reasons.

After defeat in the 2015 Balearic regional election, Bauzá resigned as leader of the People's Party of the Balearic Islands, and Martínez led a critical sector against new leader Biel Company. In February 2021, Martínez was elected leader of the PP in Palma, with all but four of the 558 votes.

In January 2023, national PP leader Alberto Núñez Feijóo chose Martínez as candidate for mayor of Palma in the year's local elections. Martínez promised investment in the tourist industry, the local police force and cleaning of the city. In the election, the PP took the plurality with 11 seats out of 29, but would have needed the support of the 6 councillors from Vox in order to gain a majority, with the other 12 seats leaning to the left; in the end, he was elected mayor as each other party voted for their own candidates. Martínez turned down a coalition government with Vox, whose candidate Fulgencio Coll had to announce him as the new mayor, per convention by being the oldest person on the council.
