= Bibiana Aído =

Spanish politician

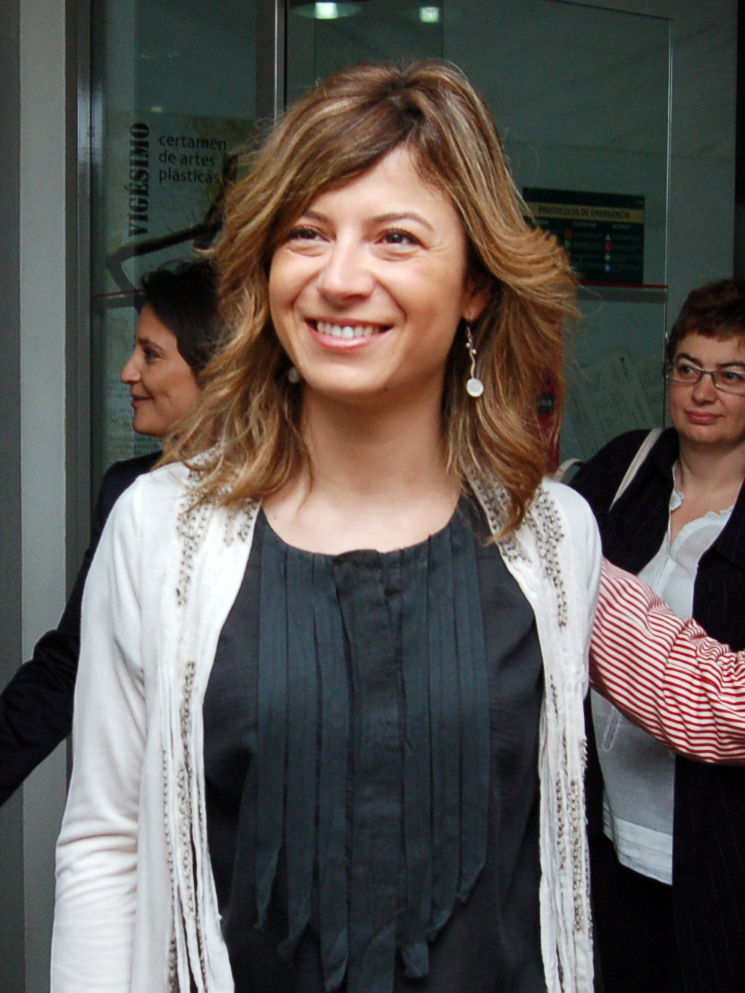

Minister of Equality
- In office 14 April 2008 – 20 October 2010
- Monarch: Juan Carlos I
- Prime Minister: José Luis Rodríguez Zapatero
- Preceded by: Office established
- Succeeded by: Office abolished

Secretary of State for Equality
- In office 20 October 2010 – 22 July 2011
- Preceded by: Office established
- Succeeded by: Laura Seara

Personal details
- Born: Bibiana Aído Almagro; 2 February 1977 (age 49) Alcalá de los Gazules, Andalusia, Spain
- Party: PSOE
- Education: University of Cádiz; University of Northumbria
- Occupation: Economist

Bibiana Aído Almagro (born 2 February 1977) is a Spanish politician who served as minister of equality. She became the first person to hold the post on 14 April 2008, at the beginning of José Luis Rodríguez Zapatero's second term as Prime Minister of Spain.

She has a bachelor's degree in international business administration from the University of Cádiz. As part of an interchange program she did part of her studies at Northumbria University's School of International Business Administration. On 14 July 2011, after being minister of equality for two years, Bibiana Aido was awarded an honorary doctorate (Doctor of Civil Law) by Newcastle Business School, Northumbria University.
