= Patricia Gómez =

Bolivian politician (born 1971)

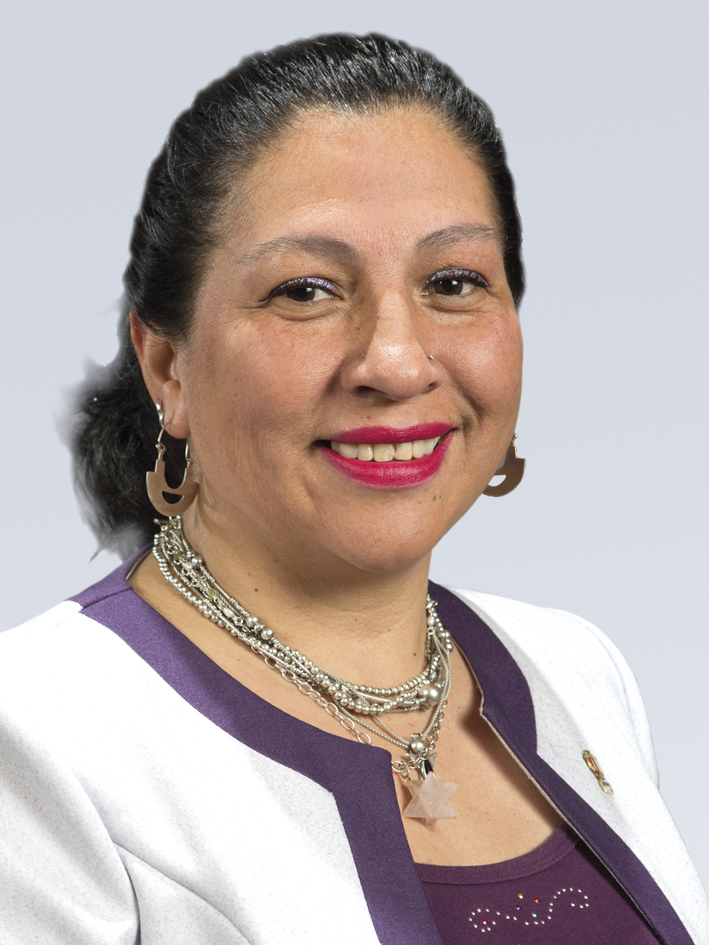
- Official portrait, 2018

Senator for Chuquisaca
- In office 18 January 2015 – 3 November 2020
- Substitute: Jorge Ordóñez
- Preceded by: Jimena Torres
- Succeeded by: Santiago Ticona

Personal details
- Born: Patricia Mercedes Gómez Andrade; 14 May 1971 (age 55) Sucre, Bolivia
- Party: Christian Democratic (2014–2016)
- Education: University of San Francisco Xavier
- Occupation: Lawyer; politician; psychologist

Patricia Mercedes Gómez Andrade (born 14 May 1971) is a Bolivian lawyer, politician, and psychologist who served as senator for Chuquisaca from 2015 to 2020.

Born and educated in Sucre, Gómez spent her career as an organizer and consultant for non-governmental organizations, with stints as a social worker, family lawyer, and general psychologist intermixed. She gained prominence in women's rights circles for her collaboration with entities such as the Juana Azurduy Center and other non-profits, as well as with faith-based groups, including Catholics for the Right to Choose.

Gómez was one of two elected senators from the Christian Democratic Party in the 2014 elections. Entering office in 2015, she led the party's Senate parliamentary group in 2016 but was expelled from the caucus the same year over her support of government-backed changes to parliamentary procedure. Independent for the duration of her term, Gómez did not seek reelection and left office in 2020.

== Early life and career ==
=== Early life and education ===
Patricia Gómez was born on 14 May 1971 in Sucre. She attended primary and early secondary at the María Auxiliadora Education Unit, followed by the state school Simón Rodríguez for the duration of secondary. After that, Gómez enrolled at the University of San Francisco Xavier, where she studied law and psychology.

Gómez graduated as a practicing lawyer and psychologist – with postgraduate diplomas in national women's rights legislation from Siglo XX University, Potosí; gender and domestic violence from Franz Tamayo University, Cochabamba; and couples' counseling from the Venezuela Center for Psychological, Psychiatric, and Sexological Research.

=== Career and activism ===
A self-declared "feminist since her youth", Gómez spent much of her career in the fields of women's and youth rights. She got her start in broadcasting, directing the program Revista Juvenil for Sucre-based station Radio Loyola from 1991 to 1994. Between 1994 and 1995, Gómez worked as a legal assistant at the Juana Azurduy Center and was a facilitator for different programs sponsored by the organization throughout the mid-to-late 1990s.

As a consultant, Gómez collaborated with a number of non-governmental organizations and non-profits dedicated to women's rights, including CARE International, Family Care International, Marie Stopes International, and Pro Mujer. During this time, she organized and headlined several conferences, seminars, and workshops covering women's issues.

Outside of activism, Gómez spent a stint as a government-employed social worker from 1998 to 1999 before shifting to private sector service. She spent a decade as a family lawyer from 2005 to 2015 and worked as a general psychologist from 2012 to 2015.

== Chamber of Senators ==
=== Election ===
The Christian Democratic Party (PDC) presented Gómez as its ticket-heading Senate candidate for Chuquisaca in September 2014. (Note: The PDC's original nominee, María Teresa Rivero Gutiérrez, was eliminated from contention by the Supreme Electoral Tribunal.) Gómez's political experience prior to that point was limited; (Note: She had previously provided consultancy services to the Vice Ministry of Early Childhood Education.) the nomination, rather, was a recognition of her prominence in regional women's organizations – including faith-based ones, such as Catholics for the Right to Choose. (Note: During the campaign, Gómez moderated her stance on abortion and avoided making clear statements on whether she was pro-choice or pro-life. She affirmed the limited legal right to an abortion under Bolivia's antiquated penal code while maintaining that "the debate is not over".) For the 2014 campaign, the Christian conservative PDC had sought to broaden its appeal toward women: Tomasa Yarhui was the front's vice-presidential candidate, and the party's platform promoted the establishment of a women's government ministry and ombudsman's office. In a tight race, the PDC narrowly beat out rival Democratic Unity (UD) for second place, displacing former prefect Savina Cuéllar and making Gómez the department's lone opposition senator – one of two within the PDC bench, alongside Víctor Hugo Zamora. (Note: The PDC's total membership in the Senate amounted to four: Gómez, Zamora, and their respective substitutes.)

=== Tenure ===
Led by Zamora – a skilled negotiator considered pragmatic toward the government – the PDC in the Senate centered its focus on oversight and foreign relations. The party tapped Gómez to chair the chamber's International Policy Commission, a post she wrested control of from UD – the larger opposition front – with the votes of the ruling Movement for Socialism (MAS). She went on to head the commission for the duration of her tenure, with intermissions in 2017 and 2018 to occupy the PDC's sole seat on the Senate's governing directorate.

Gómez was the PDC's representative on the Senate Ethics Commission from 2015 to 2016. Appointed leader of the PDC parliamentary group in 2016, she was ratified on the Ethics Commission that May. Decisions taken by Gómez from this position generated tensions within her caucus. In September, she joined the MAS in approving amendments to the body's regulations, which – among other things – obligated senators with pending legal sentences in the appeals process to request temporary leave. Gómez defended the new norm, stating that legislators should be "grateful" for the "possibility" to remain in office after an initial sentence. Opponents, however, criticized it as a means for the ruling party to oust its critics from office.

For her stance on the controversial rules change, Gómez was expelled from the PDC. Further threats to unseat her never panned out, though members of the party did lodge complaints against her with the Ethics Commission. Faced with discontent from within its own ranks, the MAS ultimately repealed the articles in question. Gómez remained an independent for the duration of her tenure, and served another term on the Ethics Commission in 2019. She later backed similar legislation prohibiting individuals with legal sentences for violence against women from serving as civil servants.

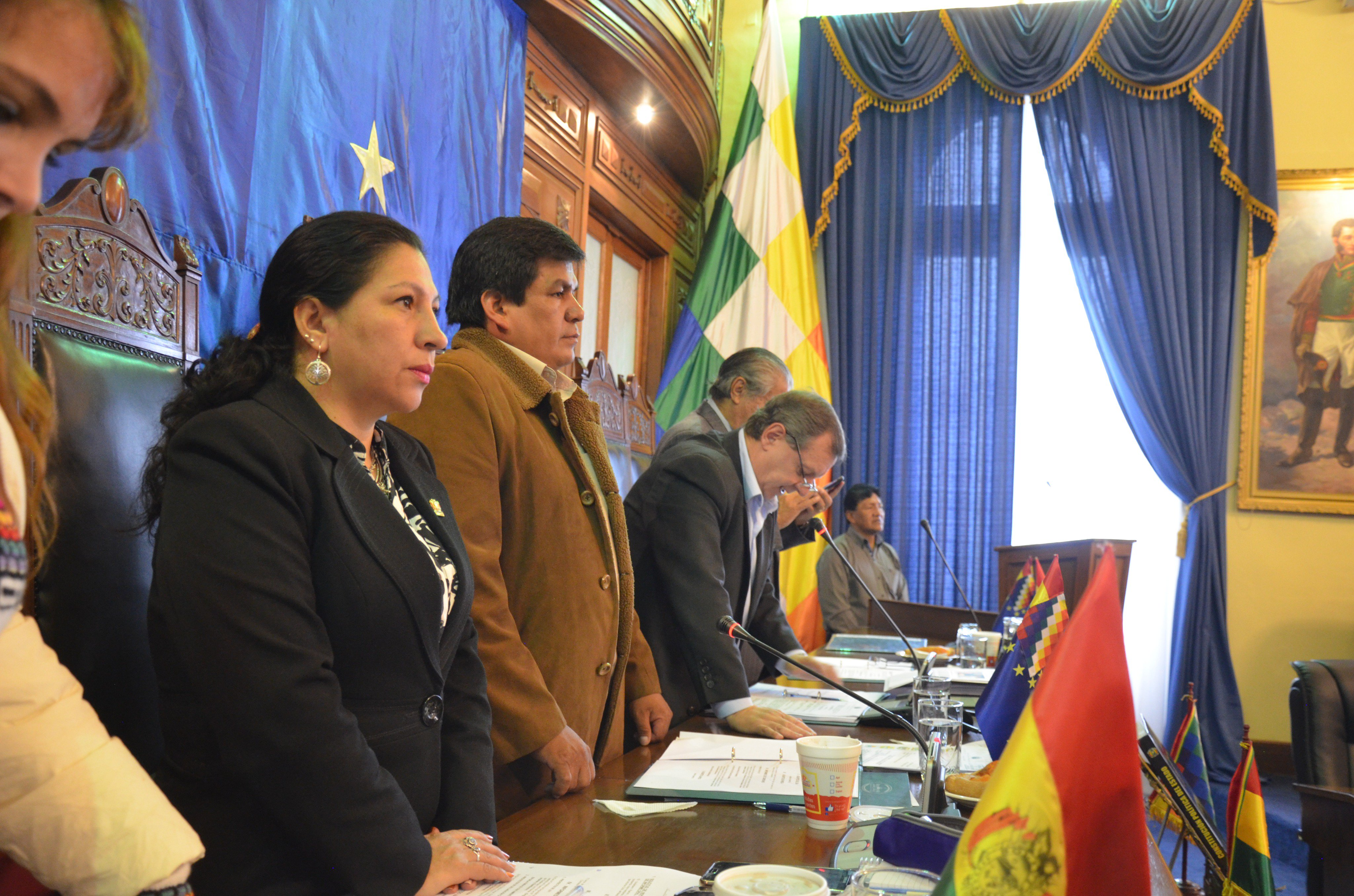
Gómez presides the Senate's directorate

Disillusioned and with a certain "cynicism" toward parliamentary governance, Gómez declined to seek reelection, stating that she "would not like to continue in politics". Given their schism, the PDC opted not to re-nominate her, either in the 2019 or 2020 elections. She served out the remainder of her term as vice president of Chuquisaca's parliamentary delegation from 2019 until she left office in 2020.

=== Commission assignments ===
- Chamber of Senators Directorate (Second Secretary: 2017–2019)
- International Policy Commission (President: 2015–2017, 2019–2020)
- Ethics and Transparency Commission (2015–2016, 2016–2017, 2019–2020)

== Electoral history ==
Electoral history of Patricia Gómez
Year	Office	Party	Votes			Result	Ref.
Year	Office	Party	Total	%	P.	Result	Ref.
2014	Senator	Christian Democratic	44,671	17.08%	2nd	Won	(Note: Presented on an electoral list. The data shown represents the share of the vote the entire party/alliance received in that constituency.)
Source: Plurinational Electoral Organ | Electoral Atlas

Senate of Bolivia
Preceded by Jimena Torres	Senator for Chuquisaca; 2015–2020; Served alongside: Milton Barón, Nélida Sifuentes, Omar Aguilar	Succeeded by Santiago Ticona
Preceded by Víctor Hugo Zamora	Second Secretary of the Senate; 2017–2019	Succeeded by Víctor Hugo Zamora
Party political offices
Preceded by Víctor Hugo Zamora	Leader of the Senate; Christian Democratic Party Caucus; 2016–2017	Succeeded by Víctor Hugo Zamora
