= Mateo Isern =

Spanish politician (born 1959)

Mateo Isern Estela (born 4 April 1959), also sometimes referred to with the Catalan first name Mateu, is a Spanish former politician. As a member of the People's Party, he was a city councillor and the mayor of Palma de Mallorca from 2011 to 2015, and a member of the Congress of Deputies in the first half of 2016. He retired from politics after a failed attempt to be re-elected as mayor in 2019.

== Biography ==
Born in Palma de Mallorca, Isern was a lawyer and businessman when in January 2011, he was given the People's Party's (PP) nomination for mayoral candidate of the city. In the election in May, he won an absolute majority of 17 seats on the city council. In October 2014, he announced he would not run for re-election in 2015 and would leave politics, believing he did not have enough support from the party.

In October 2015, Isern returned to politics, submitting a candidacy to lead the PP list for the Balearic Islands constituency in the general election in December. He was chosen to lead the list for the Congress of Deputies with 61.5% support from the executive of the People's Party of the Balearic Islands. One week after being elected, he suffered a motorcycle accident with his wife. He was temporarily paralysed and then used a wheelchair before having months of rehabilitation. He did not mention the accident until returning to politics in December 2018.

Isern declined to run for re-election in the 2016 Spanish general election, citing "completely unforeseen circumstances". He retired from politics, before being brought back by the president of the Balearic PP, Biel Company, to run for mayor of Palma again in 2019. The incumbent coalition of the Spanish Socialist Workers' Party (PSOE), Més per Mallorca and Podemos won 15 out of 27 seats, and Isern retired from politics.
