= Institute of Women =

Spanish autonomous agency

- Instituto de las Mujeres
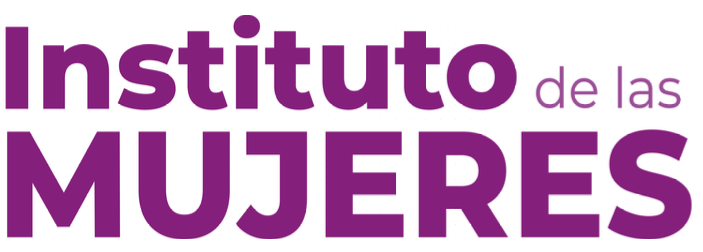
- Logotype since 2021

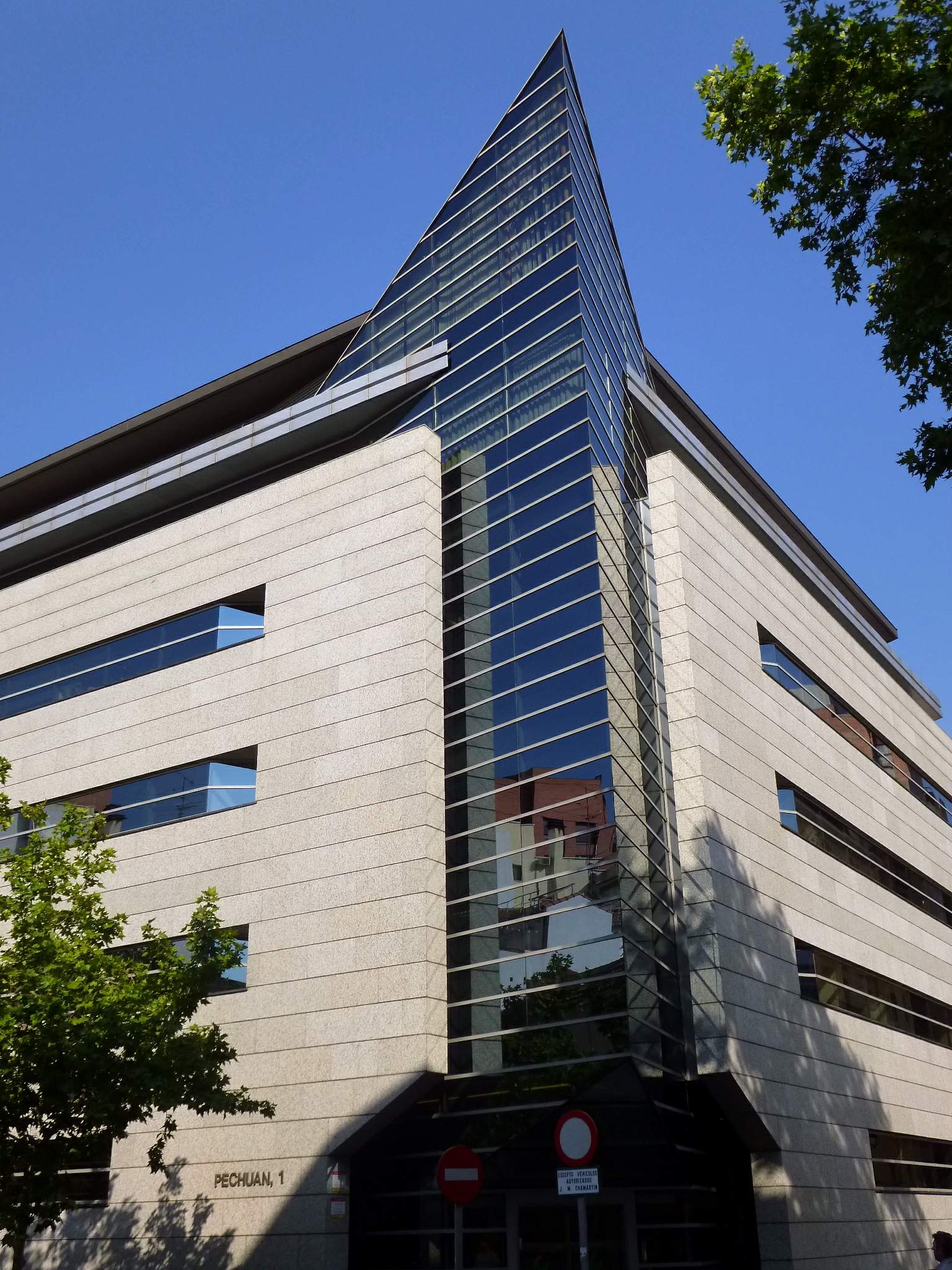
- Pechuán 1 Building, headquarters of the agency

Agency overview
- Formed: October 24, 1983; 42 years ago
- Headquarters: C. de Pechuán, 1, Chamartín, 28002 Madrid, Spain
- Employees: 92 (31 December 2023)
- Annual budget: €27.81 m EUR (2023)
- Agency executive: Isabel García Sánchez, Director
- Parent department: Ministry of Equality
- Website: www.inmujeres.gob.es

The Institute of Women (Instituto de las Mujeres, formerly Instituto de la Mujer) is a Spanish autonomous agency attached to the Ministry of Equality. It was established in 1983, "with its main aim ... the promotion of conditions to facilitate social equality between the sexes and the participation of women in political, cultural, economic and social life".

== Notable people ==
- Mercedes Bengoechea (born 1952), Spanish feminist sociolinguist, professor
- Carlota Bustelo (1939–2025), Spanish politician and first Institute director
