= Soledad Murillo =

Spanish feminist sociologist, researcher and politician

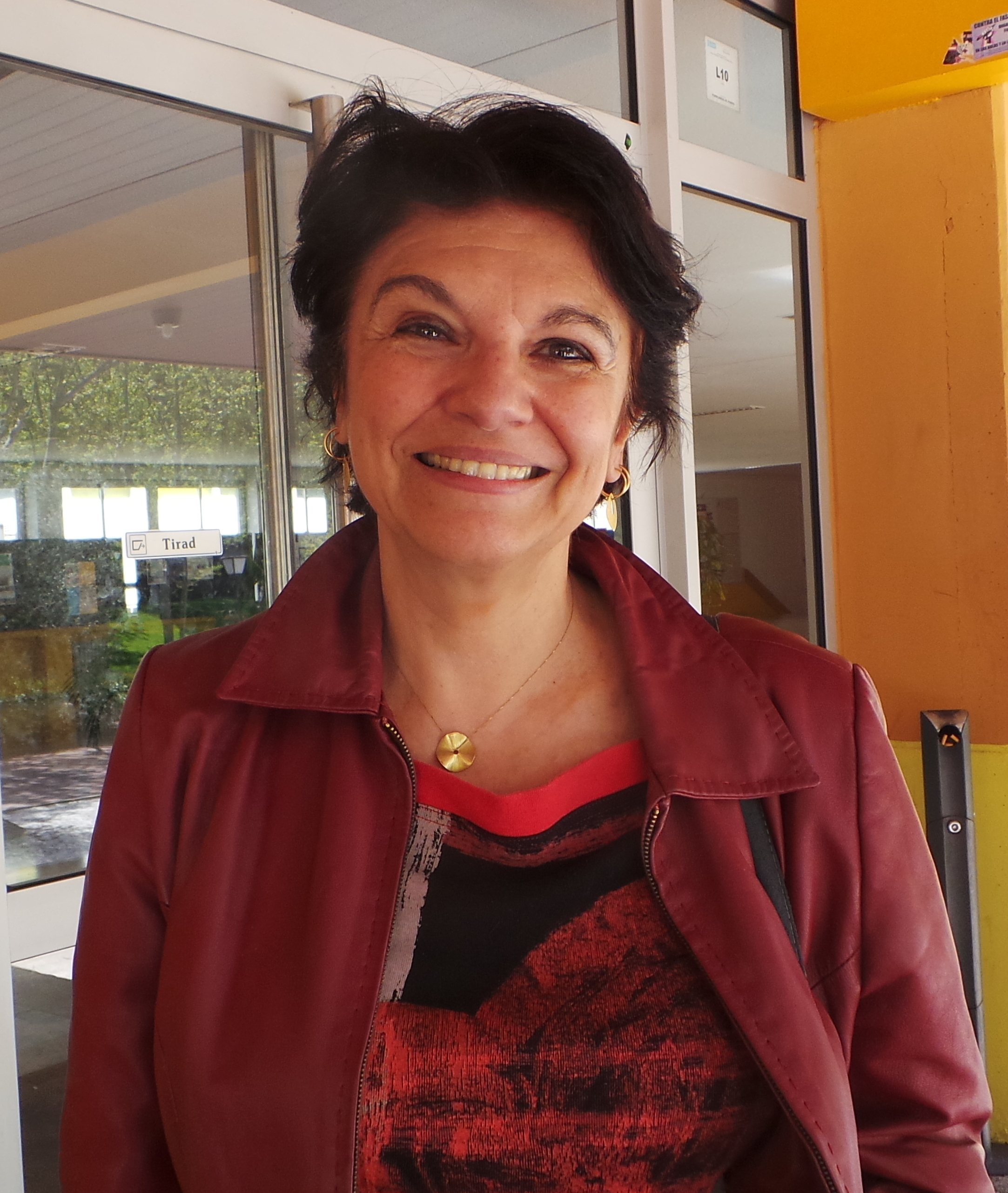
- 2016

Secretary of State for Equality
- Incumbent
- Assumed office 9 June 2018
- President: Pedro Sánchez
- Preceded by: Mario Garcés

Member of the City Council of Salamanca
- In office 2011–2015

Secretary General for Equality of the Ministry of Labor and Social Affairs
- In office 30 April 2004 – 17 April 2008

Personal details
- Born: Soledad Murillo de la Vega; 21 April 1956 (age 70) Madrid, Spain
- Party: Spanish Socialist Workers' Party
- Education: Complutense University of Madrid
- Occupation: Sociologist, researcher, politician
- Website: soledadmurillo.es

Soledad Murillo de la Vega (born 21 April 1956) is a Spanish feminist sociologist, researcher, and politician. Since 9 June 2018 she has been the Secretary of State for Equality in the government of Pedro Sánchez. From 2004 to 2008 she was the Secretary General for Equality of Spain's Ministry of Labor and Social Affairs, occupying the top political position in matters of equality in the government of José Luis Rodríguez Zapatero. From 2009 to 2013 she was part of the United Nations' Convention on the Elimination of All Forms of Discrimination Against Women (CEDAW) Committee, and from 2011 to 2015 she was a member of the City Council of Salamanca for the Spanish Socialist Workers' Party (PSOE).

She holds a PhD in sociology from the Complutense University of Madrid and is a full professor of the Department of Sociology and Communication at the University of Salamanca's Faculty of Social Sciences, where she promoted the Women's Studies Seminar and advocated for the first doctorate in Gender Studies. Her research as a sociologist has focused on the analysis of men's and women's time in terms of the tensions generated by the compatibility of the labor market with family life, analyzing why such reconciliation is a feminine and non-masculine problem, as well as associationism in women's organizations.

== Biography ==
Soledad Murillo received a licentiate in Sociology from the Complutense University of Madrid in 1981, a university where she completed her doctorate in sociology in the Department of Methodology, Research, and Theory of Communication (1993). From 1990 to 1992 she took postgraduate studies in Feminism and Enlightenment. In 1993 she presented her doctoral thesis La división sexual de los espacios público, privado y doméstico (The Sexual Division of Public, Private, and Domestic Spaces).

From 1988 to 1991 she worked as a technical staff member in the Ministry of Labor's Subdirectorate of Studies. In 1993 she joined the University of Salamanca as a full professor of sociology, where she remained until 2004.

In 1995, she promoted the University of Salamanca's Women's Studies Seminar (SEM), and was its president from 1997 until it was disbanded in 2009.

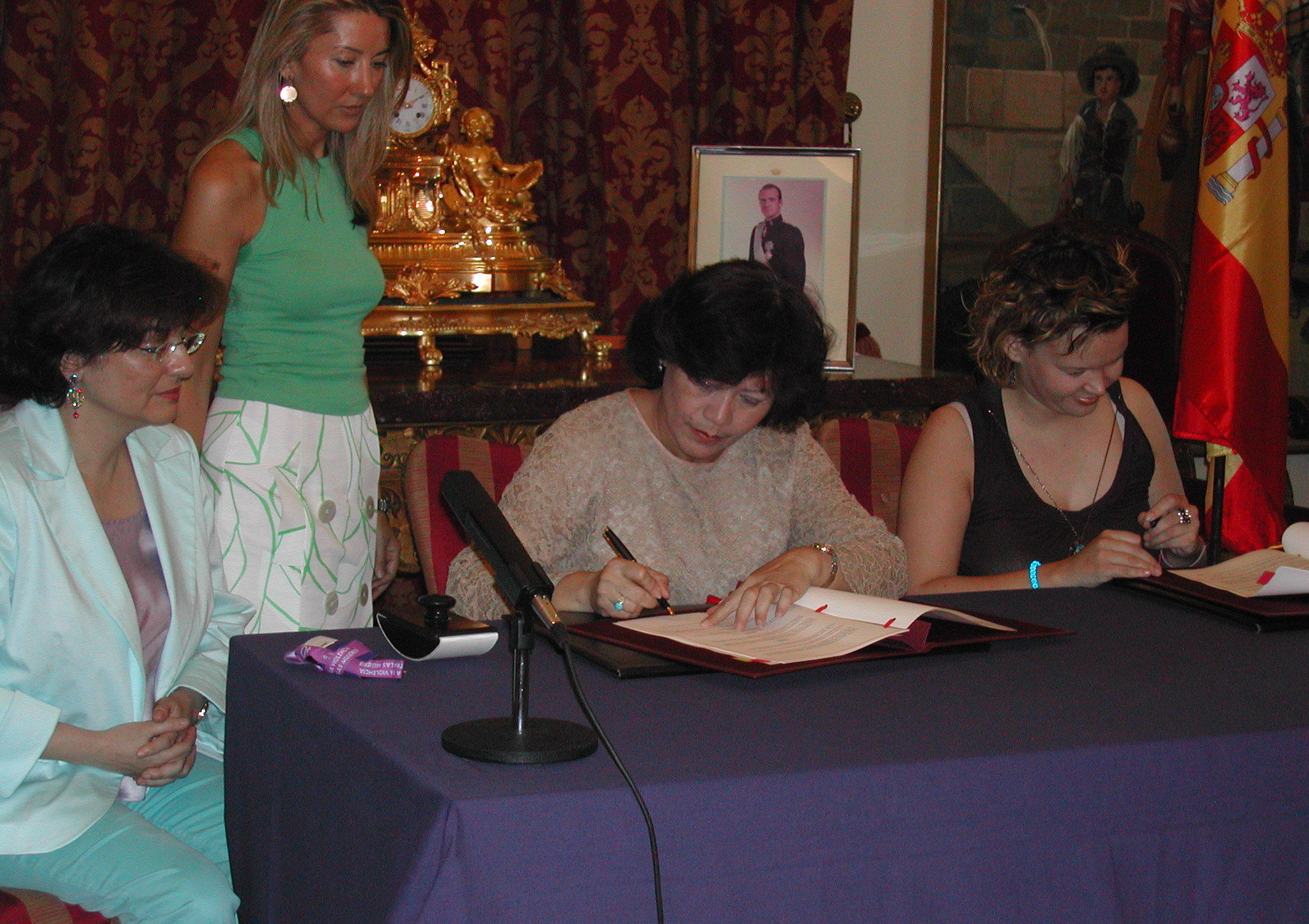
Soledad Murillo with UNIFEM Executive Director Noeleen Heyzer and Leire Pajín in March 2005

On 30 April 2004, she was appointed to a new position created by the government of José Luis Rodríguez Zapatero, Secretary General for Equality, with the objective of fighting gender violence and establishing real equality between women and men. She served during the eighth legislature (2004–2008) presided over by José Luis Rodríguez Zapatero, a period in which she promoted the Organic Law on Comprehensive Protection Measures Against Gender Violence. She was dismissed on 17 April 2008.

On 12 December 2008, she was appointed director of the Equality Unit of the University of Salamanca.

From 2009 to 2013 she was part of the United Nations' Convention on the Elimination of All Forms of Discrimination Against Women (CEDAW) Committee.

From 2011 to 2015 she was a member of the City Council of Salamanca in opposition for the PSOE.

In 2015 she occupied the second place on the PSOE list for Salamanca in the legislative elections without achieving a seat. She maintained her struggle against gender violence.

She was a full professor of the Department of Sociology and Communication at the University of Salamanca's Faculty of Social Sciences when in June 2018 she was appointed Secretary of State for Equality at the proposal of the Vice President of the Government and Minister of the Presidency, Relations with the Courts, and Equality, Carmen Calvo, in the government of Pedro Sánchez.

== Time and the conciliation between the public and the private ==
In various publications Murillo denounces the social devaluation of the private and domestic sphere despite the number of hours invested in the production of household goods and services, as well as the care of dependents, which also requires the existence of a person responsible for their organization, usually a woman. Also the lack of privacy and "own time" of the women who devote most of their time to family obligations and care for the people around them.

In 2003 she directed the study Ciudadanía activa: las Asociaciones de Mujeres en España (Active Citizenship: Women's Associations in Spain), with the participation of 807 women's associations, in which the keys to advancing towards civil dialogue between public authorities and associations that give body to social movements were presented, and identified the weaknesses and challenges of the associations themselves. In it she denounces how women's groups perceive the discriminatory treatment to which they are subjected by the public powers, and as a result they consider that it is usual for political parties not to recognize their achievements, however important they have been, or that have helped to create social welfare.

== Awards and recognitions ==
- 2009 Progressive Women Award, granted by the Federation of Progressive Women
- 2011 Freedom Award, granted by the Bejarana Socialist Association
- 2017 Clara Campoamor Award, awarded by the Club of 25
- 2017 1st Progressive Women's Retreat Award

== Publications ==
=== Individual ===
- La mujer asalariada ante la negociación colectiva (1992). Dolores Liceras Ruiz, Soledad Murillo de la Vega; Susana Brunel (coord.), Rita Moreno Preciado (coord.), María Jesús Vilches (coord.) Fundación 1º de Mayo, 1992. ISBN 9788440484642.
- El mito de la Vida Privada: de la entrega al tiempo propio (2006). Editorial Siglo XXI. ISBN 9788432312328.
- Detectives y camaleones: el grupo de discusión: una propuesta para la investigación cualitativa (2008). Soledad Murillo de la Vega and Luis Mena Martínez. Madrid: Talasa, 2006. ISBN 9788488119612.

=== Contributions to collective works ===
- "Postmodernidad: O la crisis del sujeto ¿masculino?" in Mujeres y hombres en la formación de la teoría sociológica / coord. by María Ángeles Durán Heras, 1996, ISBN 8474762332, pp. 273–296
- "Presentación al bloque de empleo" in Mujeres, derecho, participación política y empleo / Ana María Portal Nieto (lit. ed.), 1998, ISBN 8480212144, pp. 9–12
- "Nuevos riesgos y nuevas formas de pensar el empleo femenino" in Feminismo : del pasado al presente / coord. by María Teresa López de la Vieja de la Torre, 2000, ISBN 8478009418, pp. 77–86
- "Ciudadanía" in Diccionario de la solidaridad. (I), 2003, ISBN 8484427358, pp. 93–108
- "Introducción a las técnicas cualitativas en un marco documental" in Metodologías de investigación en Información y Documentación / coord. by Ana Belén Ríos Hilario, José Antonio Frías Montoya, 2004, ISBN 8478005633, pp. 213–224
- "Derechos humanos: ¿nominalismo o realidad?" in Ciudadanos de Europa : derechos fundamentales en la Unión Europea / coord. by María Teresa López de la Vieja de la Torre, 2005, ISBN 849742350X, pp. 103–119
- "La aplicación de la Ley Orgánica de medidad de protección integral contra la violencia de género" in II Congreso sobre Violencia Doméstica y de Género. Granada, 23–24 February 2006, ISBN 8496518663, pp. 51–56
- "Las mujeres y el poder" in Mujeres: igualdad y libertad : un homenaje a Enriqueta Chicano / coord. by Cruz Sánchez de Lara Sorzano, 2007, ISBN 9788447028351, pp. 211–216
- "Crónica de una apuesta institucional: En homenaje a Ana Díaz Medina, amiga y compañera" in La igualdad como compromiso: estudios de género en homenaje a la profesora Ana Díaz Medina / coord. by María Esther Martínez Quinteiro, Ángela Figueruelo Burrieza, María Teresa López de la Vieja de la Torre, Olga Barrios, Carmen Velayos Castelo, María Dolores Calvo Sánchez, 2007, ISBN 9788478003563, pp. 13–16
- "Democracia participativa, ciudadanía de las mujeres y paridad". Soledad Murillo de la Vega, Alicia Miyares, Amparo Rubiales Torrejón Hacia una agenda iberoamericana por la igualdad / coord. by Rosa Conde, Rosa María Peris Cervera, Amelia Valcárcel, Mercedes Alcover Ibáñez, 2008, ISBN 9788432313585, pp. 1–34
- "La ley de Igualdad y su proyección en el futuro de las mujeres trabajadoras" in Cien años trabajando por la igualdad / coord. by Rosa María Capel Martínez, 2008, ISBN 9788469182123, pp. 279–292
- "Teoría crítica del talento: el empleo femenino" in Los retos de la igualdad en el trabajo / coord. by José María Zufiaur Narvaiza, 2009, ISBN 9788486716400, pp. 305–324
- "La ley de igualdad efectiva entre mujeres y hombres" in Religión, género y violencia / coord. by Juan José Tamayo Acosta, 2010, ISBN 9788479930950, pp. 108–121
- "Violencia de género e igualdad: la igualdad como antídoto de la violencia" in Perspectivas de la violencia de género / coord. by Jesús Pérez Viejo, Ana Escobar Cirujano, 2011, ISBN 9788493773014, pp. 11–29
- "A modo de introducción o declaración de intenciones" in Antología del pensamiento feminista español: (1726–2011) / coord. by Roberta Johnson, María Teresa de Zubiaurre, 2012, ISBN 9788437630007, pp. 663–678

=== Selected journal articles ===
- "Os perigos de asimilar 'privado' a 'doméstico'". Andaina: revista do Movemento Feminista Galego, No. 14, 1996, pp. 26–28
- "Notas sobre la obra 'de Angelis': filosofía, mercado y postmodernidad". Reis: Revista española de investigaciones sociológicas, 0210–5233, No. 84, 1998, pp. 305–308
- "La perspectiva de Género en la práctica profesional del Trabajo Social". Servicios sociales y política social, 1130–7633, No. 45, 1999, pp. 23–40
- "La invisibilización del cuidado en la familia y los sistemas sanitarios". Política y sociedad, 1130–8001, No. 35, 2000, pp. 73–80
- "Violencia de género: de los planes de actuación a la ley orgánica". Cuadernos de trabajo social, 0214–0314, 1988–8295, No. 18, 2005, pp. 227–229
- "'No habrá democracia mientras exista violencia de género'". Lorena Fernández Bajatierra (interviewer), Soledad Murillo de la Vega (interviewee), Cuadernos para el diálogo, 0011–2534, No. 13 (September 2006), pp. 112–115
- "Un gesto político frente a la violencia contra las mujeres". Revista de educación, 0034–8082, No. 342, 2007, pp. 167–188
- "La ley de igualdad efectiva entre mujeres y hombres". Estudios de derecho judicial, 1137–3520, No. 142, 2007, pp. 95–110
- "Productividad e igualdad: revisando modelos". Temas para el debate, 1134–6574, No. 179 (October 2009), pp. 33–36
- "Los efectos de separar violencia de igualdad". Soledad Murillo de la Vega. Temas para el debate, 1134–6574, No. 209 (April 2012), pp. 18–20
- "El papel del conocimiento experto en las políticas públicas de igualdad en España". Kerman Calvo Borobia, Marta Gutiérrez Sastre, Luis Mena Martínez, Soledad Murillo de la Vega. Investigaciones feministas: papeles de estudios de mujeres, feministas y de género, 2171–6080, No. 5, 2014, pp. 157–183
