= Marc Pons Pons =

Spanish politician (born 1973)

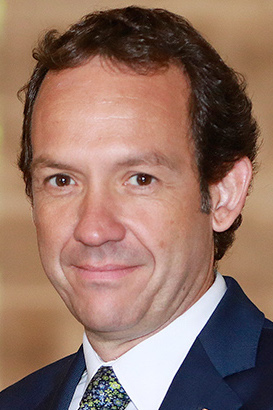
- Pons in 2019

President of the Island Council of Menorca
- Incumbent
- Assumed office 26 May 2019
- Preceded by: Joana Barceló
- Succeeded by: Santiago Tadeo

Personal details
- Born: 21 March 1973 (age 53)
- Party: Spanish Socialist Workers' Party

Marc Isaac Pons Pons (born 21 March 1973) is a Spanish politician. From 2008 to 2011, he served as president of the island council of Menorca. From 2015 to 2016, he served as minister of the presidency and as government spokesperson of the Balearic Islands. From 2016 to 2019, he served as minister of territory, energy and mobility. From 2019 to 2021, he served as minister of mobility and housing.
