= Vicenç Vidal =

Spanish politician

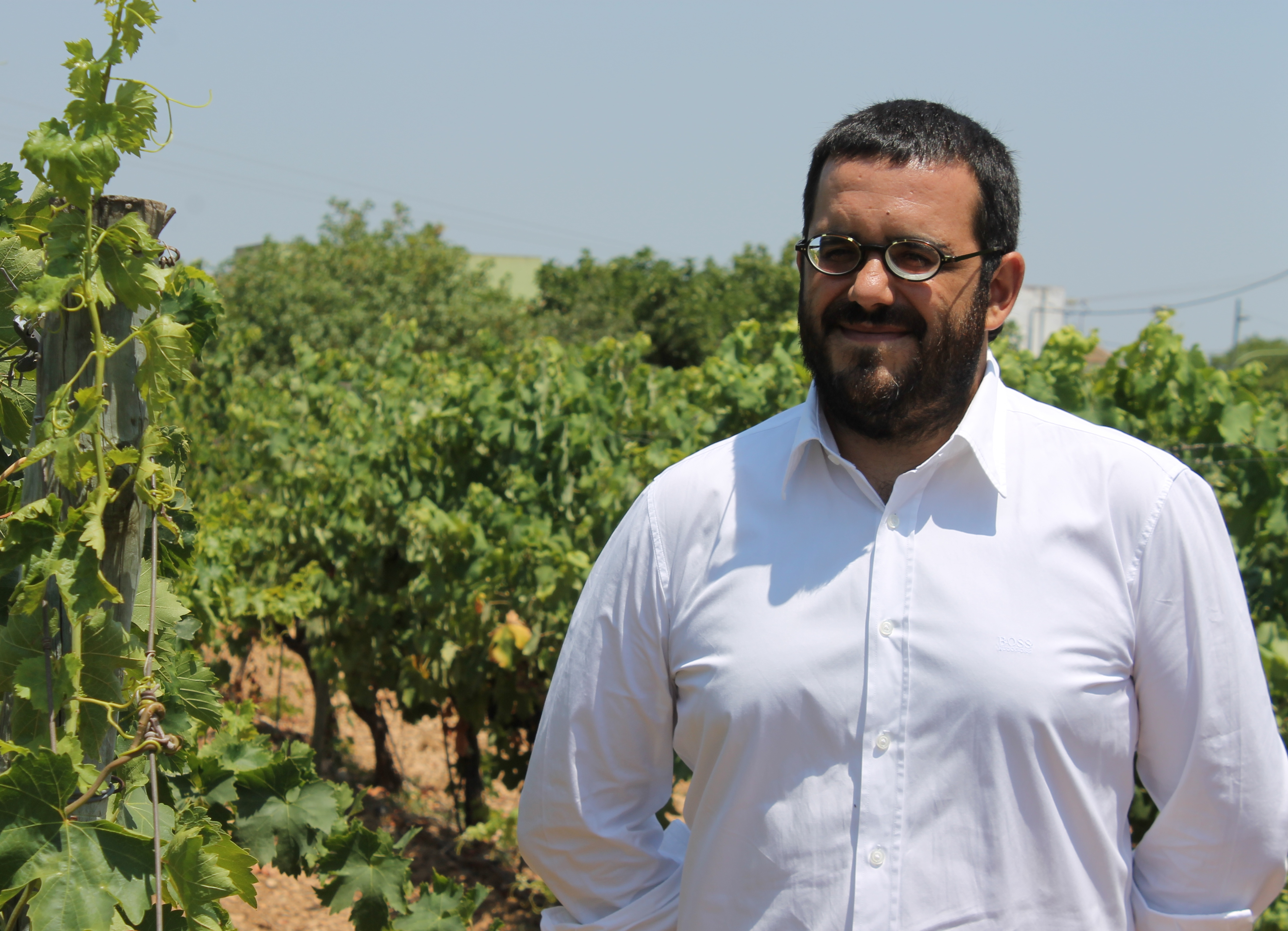
Vicenç Vidal Matas

Vicenç Vidal Matas (born 31 May 1980 in Esporles, Spain) is a Spanish politician from Més per Mallorca. Since the 2023 Spanish general election, he has represented the Balearic Islands in the 15th Congress of Deputies.

He was a senator representing the Balearic Islands for Més per Mallorca in the Senate of Spain from 12 July 2019 to 2023. He was formerly Minister of the Environment, Agriculture and Fisheries of the Government of the Balearic Islands in the IX legislature.
