= María Guijarro =

Spanish politician (born 1971)

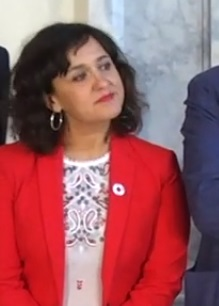
- Guijarro in 2019

Member of the Congress of Deputies
- In office 21 May 2019 – 4 June 2025
- Succeeded by: Gabriel Arrúe
- Constituency: Biscay

Personal details
- Born: 13 November 1971 (age 54)
- Party: Spanish Socialist Workers' Party

María Guijarro Ceballos (born 13 November 1971) is a Spanish politician serving as secretary of state for equality since 2025. From 2019 to 2025, she was a member of the Congress of Deputies.
