= Ana Redondo =

Spanish politician

The Most Excellent Ana Redondo
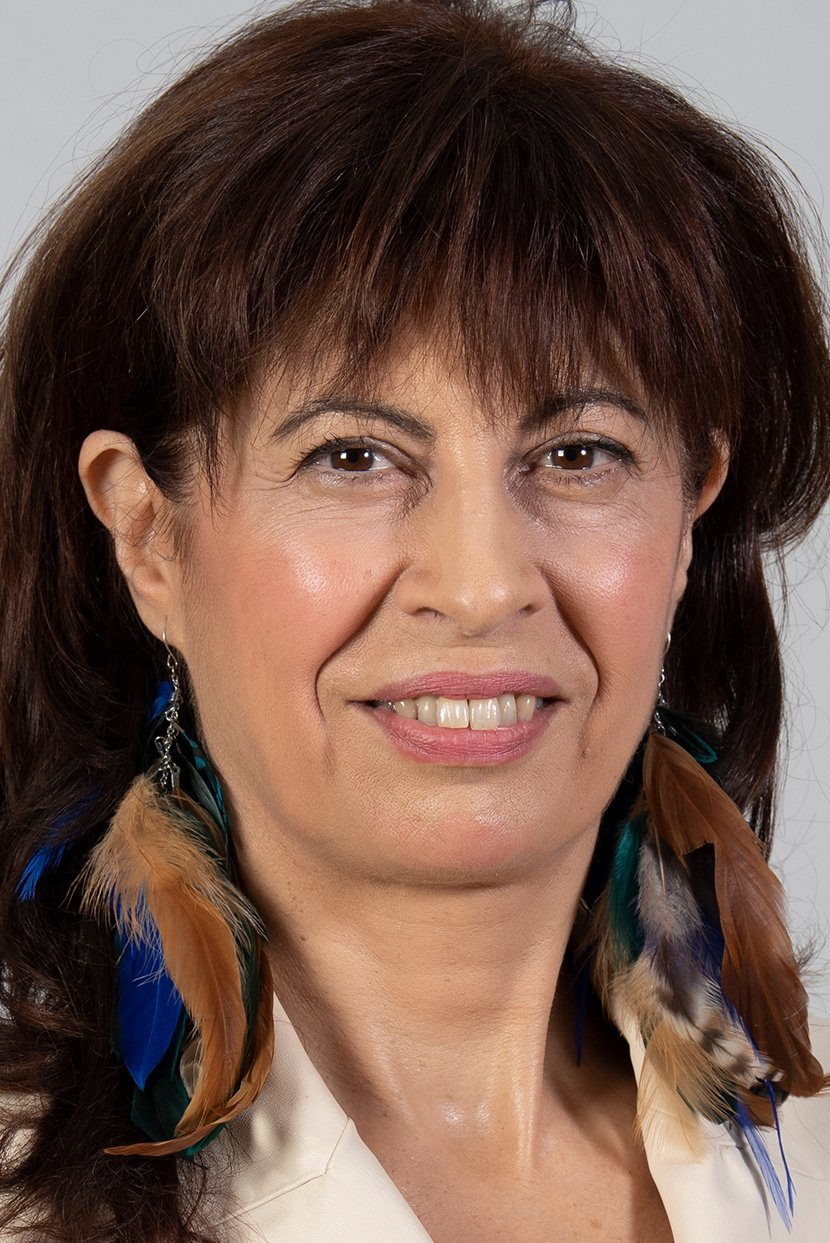
- Official portrait, 2023

Minister of Equality
- Incumbent
- Assumed office 21 November 2023
- Prime Minister: Pedro Sánchez
- Preceded by: Irene Montero

Second Deputy Mayor of Valladolid
- In office 13 June 2015 – 17 June 2023 Serving with Manuel Saravia Madrigal

Member of the Cortes of Castile and León
- In office 27 May 2007 – 16 June 2015
- Constituency: Valladolid

Member of the Valladolid City Council
- In office 13 June 2015 – 21 November 2023

Personal details
- Born: Ana Carmen Redondo García; 16 July 1966 (age 60) Valladolid, Spain
- Party: Spanish Socialist Workers' Party
- Occupation: Politician

Ana Carmen Redondo García (pronounced [ˈana reˈðondo gaɾˈθi.a]; born 16 July 1966) is a Spanish politician of the Spanish Socialist Workers' Party appointed as minister of Equality since November 2023.

Political offices
Preceded by Irene Montero	Minister of Equality; 2023–present	Incumbent
