= Biel Company (politician) =

Spanish politician

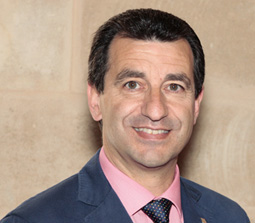

President of the People's Party of the Balearic Islands
- Incumbent
- Assumed office 26 March 2017
- Preceded by: Miquel Vidal

Member of the Parliament of the Balearic Islands
- Incumbent
- Assumed office 13 June 2015
- Constituency: Mallorca

Minister of Agriculture, Environment and Territory of the Balearic Islands
- In office 20 June 2011 – 2 July 2015
- President: José Ramón Bauzá
- Preceded by: Mercè Amer (2010) (Agriculture and Fisheries); Biel Vicens (Environment and Mobility)
- Succeeded by: Vicenç Vidal (Environment, Agriculture and Fisheries); Joan Boned (Territory, Energy and Mobility)

Personal details
- Born: Gabriel Company Bauzá; 23 November 1963 (age 62) Sant Joan, Spain
- Party: People's Party of the Balearic Islands
- Education: University of the Balearic Islands

Gabriel Company Bauzá, commonly known as Biel Company (born 23 November 1963), is a Spanish politician who has served as the president of the People's Party of the Balearic Islands since March 2017., his first political role, he served as Minister of Agriculture, Environment and Territory of the Balearic Islands in the José Ramón Bauzá government from 2011 to 2015.
