= Ministry of Equality (Spain) =

Government ministry of Spain

- Ministerio de Igualdad

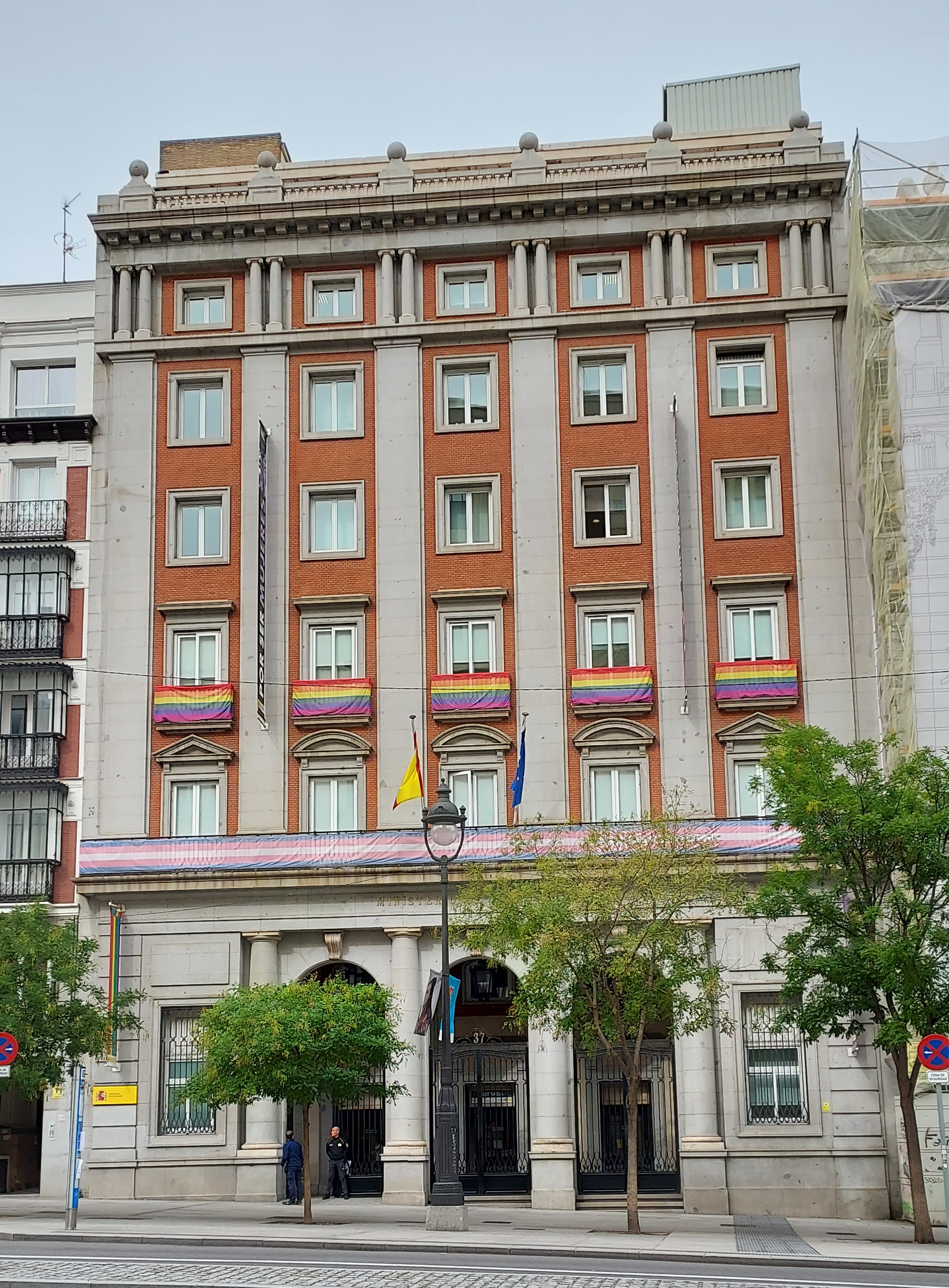
- Ministry's HQ in Madrid.

Agency overview
- Formed: April 14, 2008; 18 years ago
- Preceding agency: Ministry of Labour and Social Affairs
- Superseding agency: Ministry of Health, Social Policy and Equality
- Type: Ministry
- Jurisdiction: Government of Spain
- Headquarters: Alcalá street, 37; Madrid
- Annual budget: € 573 million, 2023
- Minister responsible: Ana Redondo García, Minister
- Website: igualdad.gob.es

The Ministry of Equality (Spanish: Ministerio de Igualdad) is a department of the Government of Spain responsible for the proposal and execution of the government's policy on equality, with a focus on making the equality between men and women real and effective as well as prevention and eradication of different forms of violence against women. The department's roles also include eradication of all kind of discrimination by sex, racial and ethnic origin, religion or ideology, sexual orientation, gender identity, age, disability or any other personal or social condition or circumstances. It existed from 2008 to 2010 when it merged with the Ministry of Health, and then from 2020.

== History ==
The department was created in 2008 at the second term of José Luis Rodríguez Zapatero's second term in order to promote equality policies set forth in the 2007 Equality Act and in the 2004 Comprehensive Act on Violence against Women, as well as promoting the programs of the Institute of Women and the Institute of Youth. The Ministry assumed the powers on equality that belonged at that time to the Ministry of Labour and Social Affairs, which was renamed Ministry of Labour and Immigration.

The Prime Minister chose Bibiana Aído to head this new department. She became the first person to hold this position in Spain and the youngest person to hold a ministerial office in democracy.

On 21 October 2010, a cabinet reshuffle merged the Ministry of Equality in the Ministry of Health (which was headed by Leire Pajín) and in exchange the Secretariat of State for Equality was created. Aído accepted the offer of the prime minister to continue at the forefront of the equality policies as Secretary of State.

The department was re-established on 13 January 2020, although without the responsibilities over youth affairs, that this time were assigned to the Ministry of Social Affairs.

== Organization ==
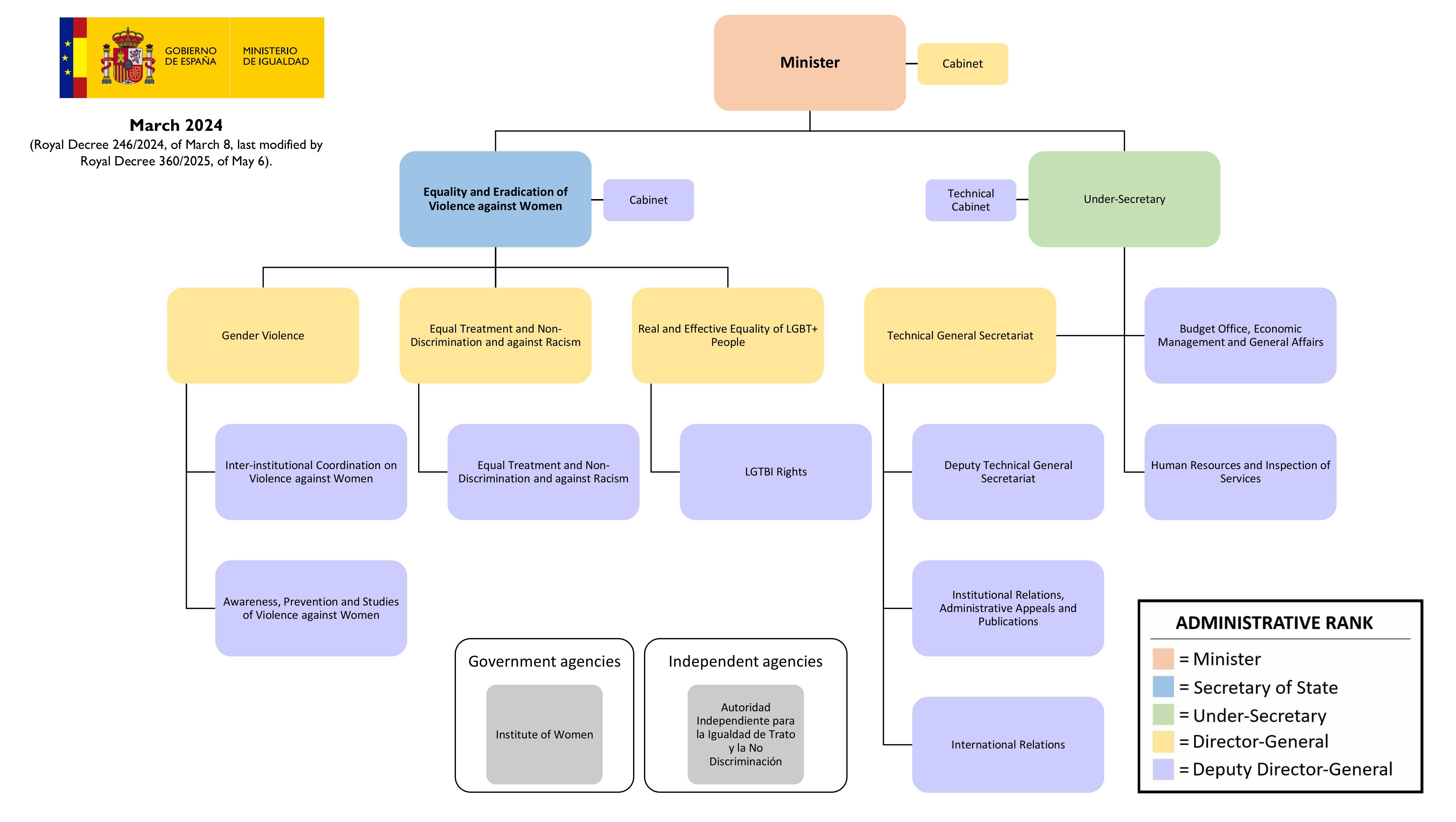
Organizational chart of the Spanish Ministry of Equality, March 2024

=== Current structure (2020–) ===
The current structure of the Department is:

- The Secretariat of State for Equality and for the Eradication of Violence against Women.
  - The Government Delegation against Gender Violence.
  - The Directorate-General for Equal Treatment and Non-Discrimination and against Racism.
  - The Directorate-General for Real and Effective Equality of LGTBI+ People.
- The Undersecretariat of Equality.
  - The Technical General Secretariat.
- The Institute of Women.

=== 2008–2010 structure ===
The Department of Equality, in its first period, was integrated by two main bodies:

- The Undersecretariat of Equality, charged with running the department on a day-to-day basis. Headed by Concepción Toquero Plaza (April–October 2008) and Antonio José Hidalgo López (2008–2010).
  - The Technical General Secretariat.
  - The Deputy Directorate-General for Economic, Budgetary and Personnel Programming and Management.
- The General Secretariat for Equality Policies, which was the main body in charge of developing the Ministry's powers. Headed by Isabel María Martínez Lozano (2008–2010).
  - The Government Delegation for Gender Violence.
  - The Directorate-General for Equality in Employment.
  - The Directorate-General against Discrimination.

The department also managed the following agencies and bodies:

- The Institute of Youth.
- The Youth Council of Spain.
- The Institute of Women.
- The Women's Participation Council.
- The Council for Equal Treatment and Non-Discrimination of Persons by Racial or Ethnic Origin

The Independent Authority for Equal Treatment and Non-Discrimination, established in May 2025, interacts with the Government through this department.

== Budget ==
In millions of euros (€)
1. Gender violence 259.7 (50.8%)
2. Equality policies 238.5 (46.6%)
3. Administration and general services 13.3 (2.60%)

For fiscal year 2023, extended to 2026, the Ministry of Equality has a consolidated budget of €511.5 million. Of this amount, €484 million are directly managed by the ministry's central services while €27.5 million are managed by its agencies.

The budget can be divided into three main areas:

1. Gender violence (Program 232C), which funds the fight against violence against women.
2. Equality policies (232B & 232D), aimed at promoting all types of equality.
3. Administration and general services (232M), covering the Ministry’s central services and administrative structure.

In addition, Programme 000X (“Internal Transfers and Disbursements”) is excluded from the analysis, as it consists of transfers between public sector entities and would otherwise lead to double counting and distort the overall budget.

=== Audit ===
The Ministry's accounts, as well as those of its agencies, are internally audited by the Office of the Comptroller General of the State (IGAE), through a Delegated Comptroller's Office within the Department itself. Externally, the Court of Auditors is responsible for auditing expenditures.

Likewise, the Congress of Deputies and the Senate Committees on Equality, exercise political control over the accounts.

== List of officeholders ==
Office name:

- Ministry of Equality (2008–2010; 2020–present)

Portrait	Name (Birth–Death)	Term of office			Party	Government	Prime Minister (Tenure)	Ref.
Portrait	Name (Birth–Death)	Took office	Left office	Duration	Party	Government	Prime Minister (Tenure)	Ref.
	Bibiana Aído (born 1977)	14 April 2008	21 October 2010	2 years and 190 days	PSOE	Zapatero II	José Luis; Rodríguez Zapatero (2004–2011)	
Office disestablished during this interval. (Note: The department's competences were transferred to the Ministry of Health, Social Policy and Equality between 2010 and 2011, to the Ministry of Health, Social Services and Equality between 2011 and 2018, and to the Ministry of the Presidency, Relations with the Cortes and Equality between 2018 and 2020.)
	Irene Montero (born 1988)	13 January 2020	21 November 2023	3 years and 312 days	Podemos	Sánchez II	Pedro Sánchez (2018–present)	
	Ana Redondo (born 1966)	21 November 2023	Incumbent	2 years and 260 days	PSOE	Sánchez III	Pedro Sánchez (2018–present)	
