= 2027 Balearic regional election =

Election in the Spanish region of the Balearic Islands

Next Balearic regional election
- No later than 27 June 2027

All 59 seats in the Parliament of the Balearic Islands 30 seats needed for a majority
- Opinion polls
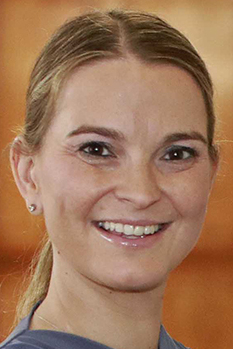

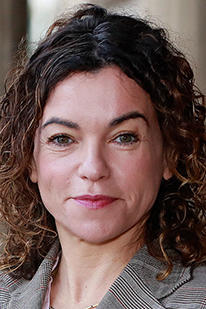

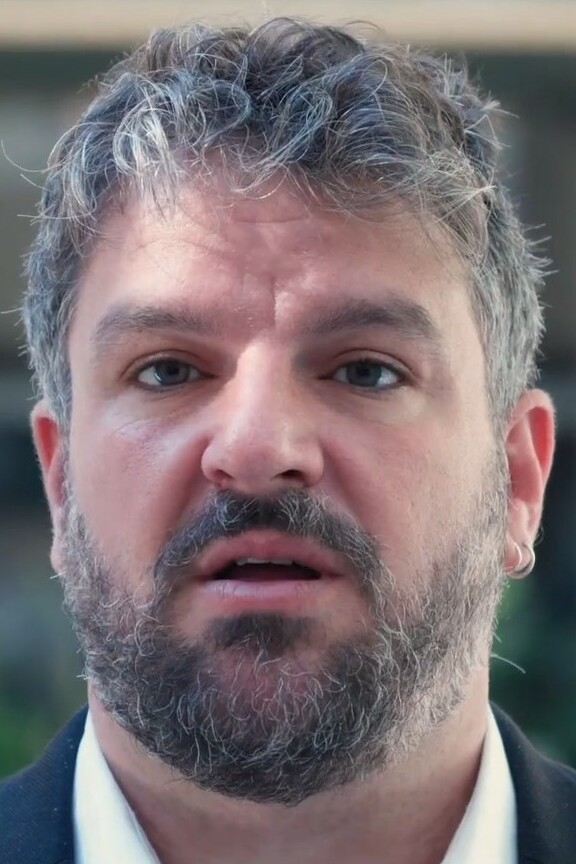

Leader	Marga Prohens	Rosario Sánchez	Gabriel Le Senne
Party	PP	PSIB–PSOE	Vox
Leader since	24 July 2021	3 July 2026	15 July 2025
Leader's seat	Mallorca	—	Mallorca
Last election	25 seats, 35.8%	18 seats, 26.5%	8 seats, 13.9%
Current seats	25	18	5
Seats needed	▲5	▲12	▲25
Leader	Lluís Apesteguia	Josep Castells	TBD
Party	Més	MxMe	EUIB–Podemos
Leader since	24 October 2021	16 December 2018	—
Leader's seat	Mallorca	Menorca	—
Last election	4 seats, 8.4%	2 seats, 1.4%	1 seat, 4.4%
Current seats	4	2	1
Seats needed	▲26	▲28	▲29
Incumbent President
Marga Prohens
PP

A regional election will be held in the Balearic Islands no later than 27 June 2027 to elect the 12th Parliament of the autonomous community. All 59 seats in the Parliament will be up for election. If customary practice is maintained, the election will be held on 23 May 2027, simultaneously with regional elections in at least seven other autonomous communities and local elections all across Spain.

== Overview ==
Under the 2007 Statute of Autonomy, the Parliament of the Balearic Islands is the unicameral legislature of the homonymous autonomous community, having legislative power in devolved matters, as well as the ability to grant or withdraw confidence from a regional president. The electoral and procedural rules are supplemented by national law provisions.

=== Date ===
The term of the Parliament of the Balearic Islands expires four years after the date of its previous election, unless it is dissolved earlier. The election decree shall be issued no later than 25 days before the scheduled expiration date of parliament and published on the following day in the Official Gazette of the Balearic Islands (BOIB), with election day taking place 54 days after the decree's publication. The previous election was held on 28 May 2023, which means that the chamber's term will expire on 28 May 2027. The election decree must be published in the BOIB no later than 4 May 2027, setting the latest possible date for election day on 27 June 2027.

The regional president has the prerogative to dissolve the Parliament of the Balearic Islands at any given time and call a snap election, provided that no motion of no confidence is in process and that dissolution does not occur before one year after a previous one under this procedure. In the event of an investiture process failing to elect a regional president within a 60-day period from the first ballot, the Parliament to be automatically dissolved and a fresh election called.

In late 2024, it emerged that regional president Marga Prohens was considering to call a snap election in the event of being unable to get her 2025 budget passed through parliament, following Vox's decision to exit the cabinet earlier that year. Amid doubts on whether her party would be able to secure an absolute majority on its own, Prohens ended up ruling out an early election call. It later transpired that Vox national leader, Santiago Abascal, had unsuccessfully attempted to force a regional snap election in April 2024. New speculation emerged in September 2025 that the national leadership of the People's Party (PP) was planning to advance the elections in Aragon and Extremadura (and possibly the Balearic Islands) to make them take place near or concurrently with the Castilian-Leonese election scheduled for early 2026, in an electoral "Super Sunday". While the alleged justification would be the regional governments' failure to approve their 2026 budgets, the true motive was attributed to PP plans—not without risk—to turn the simultaneous election call into a referendum on the national government of Prime Minister Pedro Sánchez. Prohens's government replied to such speculation by ruling out any plans for a snap election in the region, dubbing it as an "opportunistic" move. After it transpired that Extremaduran president María Guardiola had decided to call a snap election in her region, the Balearic government insisted on ruling out a snap election, commenting that "the conditions in the Balearic Islands have nothing to do with the situation in Extremadura, Aragon or Castile and León".

=== Electoral system ===
Voting for the Parliament is based on universal suffrage, comprising all Spanish nationals over 18 years of age, registered in the Balearic Islands and with full political rights, provided that they have not been deprived of the right to vote by a final sentence.

The Parliament of the Balearic Islands has 59 seats. All are elected in four multi-member constituencies—corresponding to the islands of Mallorca, Menorca, Ibiza and Formentera, each of which is assigned a fixed number of seats—using the D'Hondt method and closed-list proportional voting, with a five percent-threshold of valid votes (including blank ballots) in each constituency. The use of this electoral method may result in a higher effective threshold depending on district magnitude and vote distribution.

As a result of the aforementioned allocation, each Parliament constituency would be entitled the following seats:

Seats	Constituencies
33	Mallorca
13	Menorca
12	Ibiza
1	Formentera

The law does not provide for by-elections to fill vacant seats; instead, any vacancies arising after the proclamation of candidates and during the legislative term will be filled by the next candidates on the party lists or, when required, by designated substitutes.

=== Current parliament ===
The table below shows the composition of the parliamentary groups in the chamber at the present time.

Current parliamentary composition
Groups	Parties	Legislators	
Groups	Parties	Seats	Total
People's Parliamentary Group	PP	25	25
Socialist Parliamentary Group	PSIB–PSOE	18	18
Vox Balearics Parliamentary Group	Vox	5	5
More for Mallorca Parliamentary Group	Més	4	4
Mixed Parliamentary Group	MxMe	2	4
Mixed Parliamentary Group	EM	1	4
Mixed Parliamentary Group	Sa Unió	1	4
Non-Inscrits	INDEP	3 (Note: Francisco José Cardona, Agustín Buades and Idoia Ribas, former Vox legislators.)	3

== Parties and candidates ==
The electoral law allows for parties and federations registered in the interior ministry, alliances and groupings of electors to present lists of candidates. Parties and federations intending to form an alliance are required to inform the relevant electoral commission within 10 days of the election call, whereas groupings of electors need to secure the signature of at least one percent of the electorate in the constituencies for which they seek election, disallowing electors from signing for more than one list. Amendments in 2024 required a balanced composition of men and women in the electoral lists through the use of a zipper system.

Below is a list of the main parties and alliances which will likely contest the election:

Candidacy	Parties and alliances	Leading candidate	Ideology	Previous result		Gov.	Ref.
Candidacy	Parties and alliances	Leading candidate	Ideology	Vote %	Seats	Gov.	Ref.
PP	List: People's Party (PP)	Marga Prohens	Conservatism; Christian democracy	35.8%	25	Yes	
PSIB–PSOE	List: Socialist Party of the Balearic Islands (PSIB–PSOE)	Rosario Sánchez	Social democracy	26.5%	18	No	
Vox	List: Vox (Vox)	Gabriel Le Senne	Right-wing populism Ultranationalism; National conservatism	13.9%	8	No	
Més	List: More for Mallorca (Més); InitiativeGreens (IV); Republican Left of Catalonia (ERC)	Lluís Apesteguia	Left-wing nationalism Democratic socialism Green politics	8.4%	4	No	
EUIB– Podemos	List: We Can (Podemos); United Left of the Balearic Islands (EUIB) – Communist Party of the Balearic Islands (PCIB) – The Dawn Marxist Organization (La Aurora (OM)) – Republican Left (IR)	TBD	Left-wing populism Direct democracy Democratic socialism	4.4%	1	No	
MxMe	List: More for Menorca (MxMe)	Josep Castells	Left-wing nationalism Democratic socialism Green politics	1.4%	2	No	
Sa Unió	List: People's Party (PP) (Note: In Formentera.); Commitment to Formentera (CompromísFormentera)	Llorenç Córdoba	Conservatism	0.4%	1	No	
GxF	List: People for Formentera (GxF); Socialist Party of the Balearic Islands (PSIB–PSOE)	TBD	Environmentalism; Democratic socialism	0.4%	0	No	

== Opinion polls ==
The tables below list opinion polling results in reverse chronological order, showing the most recent first and using the dates when the survey fieldwork was done, as opposed to the date of publication. Where the fieldwork dates are unknown, the date of publication is given instead. The highest percentage figure in each polling survey is displayed with its background shaded in the leading party's colour. If a tie ensues, this is applied to the figures with the highest percentages. The "Lead" column on the right shows the percentage-point difference between the parties with the highest percentages in a poll.

=== Voting intention estimates ===
The table below lists weighted voting intention estimates. Refusals are generally excluded from the party vote percentages, while question wording and the treatment of "don't know" responses and those not intending to vote may vary between polling organisations. When available, seat projections determined by the polling organisations are displayed below (or in place of) the percentages in a smaller font; 30 seats are required for an absolute majority in the Parliament of the Balearic Islands.

Polling firm/Commissioner	Fieldwork date	Sample size	Turnout	PP	PSIB–PSOE	Vox	Més	Podemos	El Pi	MxMe	CS	Sa Unió	GxF	Sumar	SALF	Lead
IBES/Última Hora	1–5 Jun 2026	1,300	?	39.1; 28	22.8; 14	17.8; 9	9.0; 4	3.2; 0	2.6; 0	1.7; 3	0.5; 0	0.5; 1	0.3; 0	–	–	16.3
Sigma Dos/El Mundo	20–28 May 2026	936	?	35.1; 26/28	21.0; 12/14	17.5; 8/10	8.5; 4	5.7; 2	–	1.6; 2/3	–	0.4; 0/1	0.4; 0/1	–	–	14.1
NC Report/PP	14–21 May 2026	1,700	52.4	38.5; 28	23.9; 16	15.0; 8	9.9; 4	3.8; 0	3.7; 0	1.5; 2	–	0.4; 1	0.4; 0	–	–	14.6
NC Report/La Razón	16–31 May 2025	350	?	? 29	? 14	? 8	? 4	? 1	–	? 2	–	? 1	–	–	–	?
IBES/Última Hora	19–23 May 2025	1,300	?	38.6; 28	25.4; 17	14.5; 7	9.3; 4	4.0; 0	2.2; 0	1.5; 2	0.4; 0	0.4; 0	0.4; 1	–	–	13.2
Sigma Dos/El Mundo	28 Apr–12 May 2025	1,107	?	36.4; 26/27	25.7; 16/17	13.8; 7/8	9.8; 4	5.5; 1/2	3.0; 0	1.6; 2	–	0.4; 0/1	0.4; 0/1	–	–	10.7
2024 EP election	9 Jun 2024	—N/a	37.7	35.8 (26)	28.9 (21)	11.2 (6)	5.2 (3)	3.1 (0)	1.0 (0)	(Note: Within Més.)	0.6 (0)	–	–	4.4 (0)	5.3 (3)	6.9
IBES/Última Hora	13–17 May 2024	1,300	?	38.8; 28	23.9; 16	13.1; 6	10.9; 5	4.7; 0	1.8; 0	2.0; 3	0.3; 0	0.3; 0	0.4; 1	–	–	14.9
2023 general election	23 Jul 2023	—N/a	61.3	35.6 (23)	30.2 (18)	15.2 (7)	(Note: Within Sumar.)		–		–	–	–	16.6 (11)	–	5.4
2023 regional election	28 May 2023	—N/a	55.1	35.8; 25	26.5; 18	13.9; 8	8.4; 4	4.4; 1	3.8; 0	1.4; 2	1.4; 0	0.4; 1	0.4; 0	–	–	9.3

=== Voting preferences ===
The table below lists raw, unweighted voting preferences.

Polling firm/Commissioner	Fieldwork date	Sample size	PP	PSIB–PSOE	Vox	Més	Podemos	El Pi	MxMe	Sumar	SALF	Question	X mark	Lead
CIS	7–31 Mar 2025	408	21.9	23.1	10.6	5.4	1.5	0.2	0.7	0.7	0.8	22.8	4.7	1.2
2024 EP election (Note: Does not include non-resident citizens.)	9 Jun 2024	—N/a	13.9	11.2	4.3	2.0	1.2	0.4		1.7	2.1	—N/a	60.9	2.7
2023 general election	23 Jul 2023	—N/a	22.4	19.0	9.6			–		10.4	–	—N/a	36.4	3.4
2023 regional election	28 May 2023	—N/a	20.2	14.9	7.8	4.7	2.5	2.1	0.8	–	–	—N/a	42.6	5.3

=== Preferred President ===
The table below lists opinion polling on leader preferences to become president of the Balearic Islands.

Polling firm/Commissioner	Fieldwork date	Sample size							Other/ None/ Not care	Question	Lead
Polling firm/Commissioner	Fieldwork date	Sample size	Prohens PP	Armengol PSIB	Suárez PSIB	Cañadas Vox	Apesteguia Més	Gómez Podemos	Other/ None/ Not care	Question	Lead
IBES/Última Hora	1–5 Jun 2026	1,300	26.5	13.5	–	13.0	7.1	2.9	–	36.9	13.0
CIS (Note: Responses denoting a party's generic candidate are aggregated to that party's main candidate/leader at the time of the poll.)	7–31 Mar 2025	408	18.9	10.5	4.3	5.8	1.8	–	4.4	54.2	8.4

== Bibliography ==
- Ley Orgánica 5/1985, de 19 de junio, del Régimen Electoral General (Organic Law 5/1985). Official State Gazette (in Spanish). 19 June 1985 [version as of 2 July 2026]. BOE-A-1985-11672.
- Ley 8/1986, de 26 de noviembre, Electoral de la Comunidad Autónoma de las Islas Baleares (Law 8/1986). Official State Gazette (in Spanish). 26 November 1986 [version as of 2 February 2019]. BOE-A-1987-2903.
- Ley Orgánica 1/2007, de 28 de febrero, de reforma del Estatuto de Autonomía de las Illes Balears (Organic Law 1/2007). Official State Gazette (in Spanish). 28 February 2007 [version as of 28 December 2022]. BOE-A-2007-4233.
- Ley 1/2019, de 31 de enero, del Gobierno de las Illes Balears (Law 1/2019). Official State Gazette (in Spanish). 31 January 2019 [version as of 13 December 2024]. BOE-A-2019-2862.
