= Second government of Francina Armengol =

2nd government of Francina Armengol
- 11th Government of the Balearic Islands
- 2019–2023
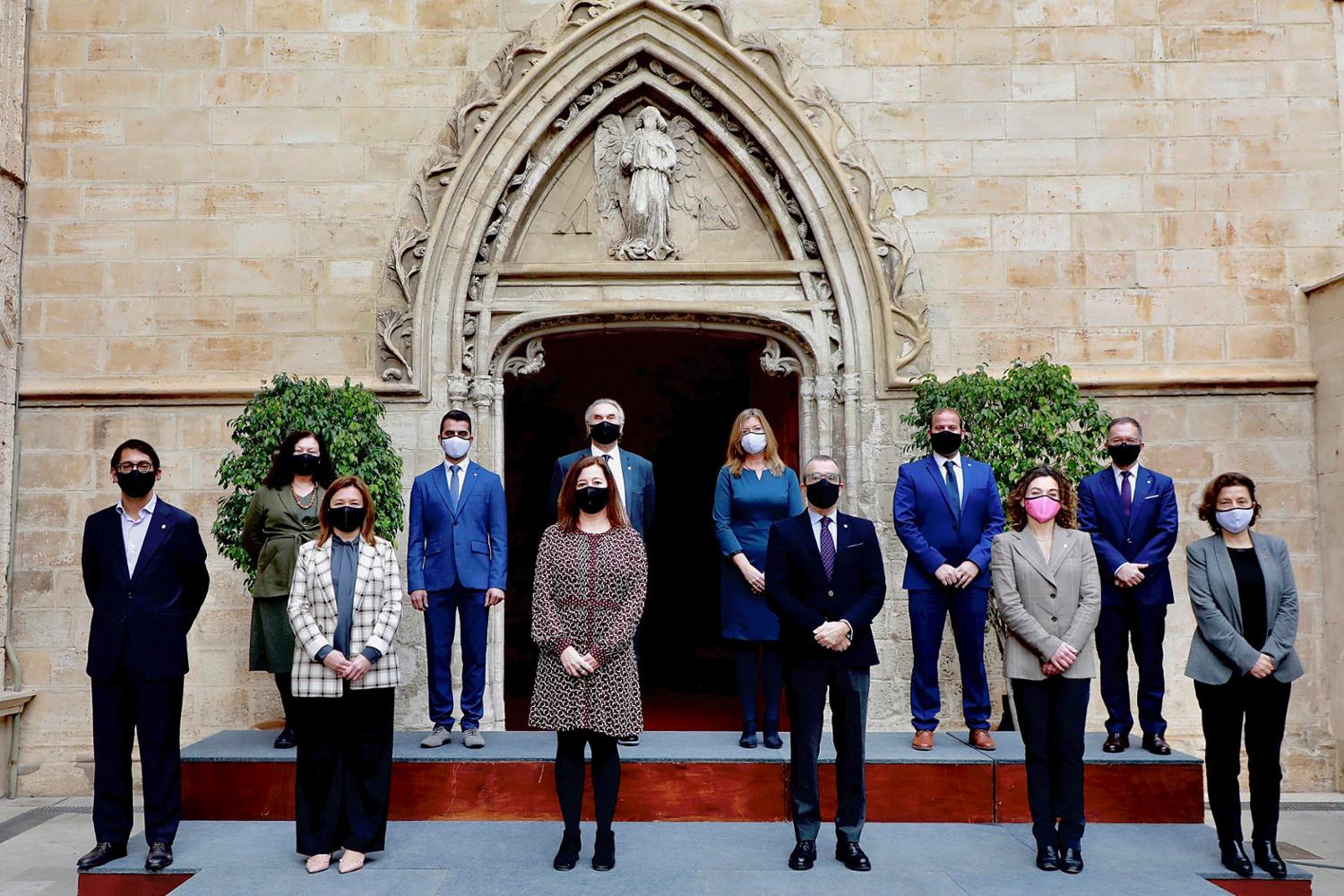
- The government in February 2021.
- Date established: 3 July 2019
- Date dissolved: 10 July 2023

Leadership and composition
- Monarch: Felipe VI
- President: Francina Armengol (2019–2023); Mae de la Concha (2023; acting)
- Vice President: Juan Pedro Yllanes
- No. of ministers: 11 (Note: Does not include the President.)
- Total no. of members: 14
- Member parties: PSIB–PSOE; Unidas Podemos; Més
- Status in legislature: Minority coalition government
- Opposition party: PP
- Opposition leader: Biel Company (2019–2021); Marga Prohens (2021–2023)
- Budget: 2020, 2021, 2022, 2023

Formation and history
- Election: 2019 regional election
- Outgoing election: 2023 regional election
- Legislature term: 10th Parliament
- Predecessor: Armengol I
- Successor: Prohens

The second government of Francina Armengol was formed on 3 July 2019, following the latter's election as President of the Balearic Islands by the Parliament of the Balearic Islands on 27 June and her swearing-in on 1 July, as a result of the Socialist Party of the Balearic Islands (PSIB–PSOE) emerging as the largest parliamentary force at the 2019 regional election. It succeeded the first Armengol government and was the Government of the Balearic Islands from 3 July 2019 to 10 July 2023, a total of 1,468 days, or 4 years and 7 days.

The cabinet comprised members of the PSIB–PSOE, Unidas Podemos and More for Mallorca (Més), as well as a number of independents proposed by the first two parties. The government agreements resulting from the government formation negotiations were dubbed as the "Bellver Agreements" (Catalan: Acords de Bellver), as they were signed in the Bellver Castle. The government received the external support of left-wing More for Menorca (MxMe) and People for Formentera (GxF), along with the abstention of centre regionalist Proposal for the Isles (El Pi). The right-of-centre People's Party (PP), Citizens (Cs) and Vox opposed the formation of the government.

== Investiture ==
Investiture; Francina Armengol (PSIB)
Ballot →	27 June 2019
Required majority →	30 out of 59
Yes: • PSIB (19); • Podemos–EUIB (6); • Més (4); • MxMe (2); • GxF (1)	32 / 59
No: • PP (16); • Cs (5); • Vox (3)	24 / 59
Abstentions: • El Pi (3)	3 / 59
Absentees	0 / 59

== Cabinet changes ==
Armengol's second government saw a number of cabinet changes during its tenure:

- On 12 February 2021, Francina Armengol announced a cabinet reshuffle that saw the Energy Transition and Productive Sectors and Education, university and Research ministries reorganized into the Energy Transition, Productive Sectors and Democratic Memory and Education and Vocational Training portfolios, respectively; Pilar Costa resigning as Minister of Presidency, Culture and Equality to become spokesperson of the PSIB group in the Parliament of the Balearic Islands, with Mercedes Garrido replacing her in the new presidency, Civil Service and Equality portfolio; Iago Negueruela assuming the competences of the Spokesperson of the Government; Josep Marí replacing Marc Pons as Mobility and Housing officeholder; and the creation of a new European Funds, university and Culture department under Miquel Company, following the disestablishment of the Public Administrations and Modernization ministry.

== Council of Government ==
The Government of the Balearic Islands is structured into the offices for the president, the vice president, 11 ministries and the post of the spokesperson of the Government.

← Armengol II Government → (3 July 2019 – 10 July 2023)
Portfolio	Name	Party	Took office	Left office	Ref.
President	Francina Armengol	PSIB–PSOE	29 June 2019	20 June 2023	
President	Mae de la Concha served in acting capacity from 20 June to 7 July 2023.				
Vice President; Minister of Energy Transition and Productive Sectors	Juan Pedro Yllanes	UP (Ind.)	3 July 2019	14 February 2021	
Minister of the Presidency, Culture and Equality; Spokesperson of the Government	Pilar Costa	PSIB–PSOE	3 July 2019	14 February 2021	
Minister of Finance and Foreign Relations	Rosario Sánchez	PSIB–PSOE	3 July 2019	10 July 2023	
Minister of Economic Model, Tourism and Labour	Iago Negueruela	PSIB–PSOE	3 July 2019	10 July 2023	
Minister of Social Affairs and Sports	Fina Santiago	Més	3 July 2019	10 July 2023	
Minister of Education, university and Research	Martí March	PSIB–PSOE (Ind.)	3 July 2019	14 February 2021	
Minister of Health and Consumer Affairs	Patricia Gómez	PSIB–PSOE	3 July 2019	10 July 2023	
Minister of Mobility and Housing	Marc Pons	PSIB–PSOE	3 July 2019	14 February 2021	
Minister of Environment and Territory	Miquel Mir	Més	3 July 2019	10 July 2023	
Minister of Agriculture, Fisheries and Food	Mae de la Concha	UP (Podem)	3 July 2019	10 July 2023	
Minister of Public Administrations and Modernization	Isabel Castro	PSIB–PSOE	3 July 2019	14 February 2021	
=== Changes February 2021 ===
Portfolio	Name	Party	Took office	Left office	Ref.
Vice President; Minister of Energy Transition, Productive Sectors and Democratic Memory (Note: On 14 February 2021, the ministries of Energy Transition and Productive Sectors, Presidency, Culture and Equality and Education, University and Research were rebranded as the Energy Transition, Productive Sectors and Democratic Memory, Presidency, Civil Service and Equality and Education and Vocational Training departments, respectively. Concurrently, the Ministry of Public Administrations and Modernization was disestablished and its competences transferred to the Presidency, Civil Service and Equality (Public Administrations) and the newly-established European Funds, University and Culture (Modernization) departments.)	Juan Pedro Yllanes	UP (Ind.)	14 February 2021	10 July 2023	
Minister of the Presidency, Civil Service and Equality	Mercedes Garrido	PSIB–PSOE	14 February 2021	10 July 2023	
Minister of Economic Model, Tourism and Labour; Spokesperson of the Government	Iago Negueruela	PSIB–PSOE	14 February 2021	10 July 2023	
Minister of Education and Vocational Training	Martí March	PSIB–PSOE (Ind.)	14 February 2021	10 July 2023	
Minister of European Funds, university and Culture (Note: Department of new creation.)	Miquel Company	PSIB–PSOE	14 February 2021	10 July 2023	
Minister of Mobility and Housing	Josep Marí	PSIB–PSOE	14 February 2021	10 July 2023	
~~Minister of Public Administrations and Modernization~~	Disestablished on 14 February 2021.				

== Departmental structure ==
Francina Armengol's second government is organised into several superior and governing units, whose number, powers and hierarchical structure may vary depending on the ministerial department.

Unit/body rank

- (■) General secretary
- (■) Director-general
- (■) Temporary staff

Office (Original name)	Portrait	Name	Took office	Left office	Alliance/party	Ref.
=== Presidency ===
Presidency (Presidència del Govern)		Francina Armengol	29 June 2019	20 June 2023	PSIB–PSOE	
Presidency (Presidència del Govern)		Mae de la Concha (acting)	20 June 2023	7 July 2023	Unidas Podemos (Podem)	
Presidency (Presidència del Govern)	16 July 2015 – 23 February 2021: (■) Cabinet of the Presidency–Chief of Staff; (■) Secretariat for Strategic Projects; (■) Secretariat for Communication; (■) Secretariat for the Cabinet of the Presidency; (■) Secretariat for the Presidency; (■) Secretariat for Protocol and Public Relations; (■) Secretariat for Citizen Services; 23 February 2021 – 10 July 2023: (■) Cabinet of the Presidency–Chief of Staff; (■) Secretariat for Strategic Projects; (■) Secretariat for Communication; (■) Secretariat for the Presidency; (■) Secretariat for Protocol and Public Relations; (■) Secretariat for Citizen Services					
Vice Presidency (Vicepresidència del Govern)		Juan Pedro Yllanes	3 July 2019	10 July 2023	Unidas Podemos (Indep., Podem nominated)	
Vice Presidency (Vicepresidència del Govern)	See Ministry of Energy Transition and Productive Sectors (3 July 2019 – 14 February 2021); See Ministry of Energy Transition, Productive Sectors and Democratic Memory (14 February 2021 – 10 July 2023)					
=== Ministry of Energy Transition and Productive Sectors ===
Ministry of Energy Transition and Productive Sectors (Conselleria de Transició Energètica i Sectors Productius) (until 14 February 2021) Ministry of Energy Transition, Productive; Sectors and Democratic Memory (Conselleria de Transició Energètica, Sectors Productius i Memòria Democràtica) (from 14 February 2021)		Juan Pedro Yllanes	3 July 2019	10 July 2023	Unidas Podemos (Indep., Podem nominated)	
Ministry of Energy Transition and Productive Sectors (Conselleria de Transició Energètica i Sectors Productius) (until 14 February 2021) Ministry of Energy Transition, Productive; Sectors and Democratic Memory (Conselleria de Transició Energètica, Sectors Productius i Memòria Democràtica) (from 14 February 2021)	3 July 2019 – 15 February 2021: (■) General Secretariat of Energy Transition and Productive Sectors; (■) Directorate-General for Energy and Climate Change; (■) Directorate-General for Innovation; (■) Directorate-General for Industrial Policy; (■) Directorate-General for Trade; 15 February 2021 – 10 July 2023: (■) General Secretariat of Energy Transition, Productive Sectors and Democratic Memory; (■) Regional Secretariat for Productive Sectors and Democratic Memory; (■) Directorate-General for Industrial Policy; (■) Directorate-General for Trade; (■) Directorate-General for Democratic Memory; (■) Directorate-General for Participation, Transparency and Volunteering; (■) Directorate-General for Energy and Climate Change; (■) Directorate-General for Innovation					
=== Ministry of the Presidency ===
Ministry of the Presidency, Culture and Equality (Conselleria de Presidència, Cultura i Igualtat) (until 14 February 2021) Ministry of the Presidency, Civil Service and Equality (Conselleria de Presidència, Funció Pública i Igualtat) (from 14 February 2021)		Pilar Costa	3 July 2019	14 February 2021	PSIB–PSOE	
Ministry of the Presidency, Culture and Equality (Conselleria de Presidència, Cultura i Igualtat) (until 14 February 2021) Ministry of the Presidency, Civil Service and Equality (Conselleria de Presidència, Funció Pública i Igualtat) (from 14 February 2021)		Mercedes Garrido	14 February 2021	10 July 2023	PSIB–PSOE	
Ministry of the Presidency, Culture and Equality (Conselleria de Presidència, Cultura i Igualtat) (until 14 February 2021) Ministry of the Presidency, Civil Service and Equality (Conselleria de Presidència, Funció Pública i Igualtat) (from 14 February 2021)	3 July 2019 – 15 February 2021: (■) General Secretariat of the Presidency, Culture and Equality; (■) Presidency's Delegation for Culture; (■) Directorate-General for Rights and Diversity; (■) Directorate-General for Coordination; (■) Directorate-General for Institutional Relations and with the Parliament; (■) Directorate-General for Communication; 15 February 2021 – 10 July 2023: (■) General Secretariat of the Presidency, Civil Service and Equality; (■) Directorate-General for Coordination, Relations with the Parliament, Rights and Diversity; (■) Directorate-General for Institutional Relations and Local Cooperation; (■) Directorate-General for the Civil Service; (■) Directorate-General for Emergencies and the Interior; (■) Directorate-General for Communication					
=== Ministry of Finance and Foreign Relations ===
Ministry of Finance and Foreign Relations (Conselleria d'Hisenda i Relacions Exteriors)		Rosario Sánchez	3 July 2019	10 July 2023	PSIB–PSOE	
Ministry of Finance and Foreign Relations (Conselleria d'Hisenda i Relacions Exteriors)	3 July – 2 August 2019: (■) General Secretariat of Finance and External Relations; (■) Directorate-General for Budgets; (■) Directorate-General for Financing; (■) Directorate-General for the Treasury and Heritage; (■) Directorate-General for Foreign Relations; (■) Directorate-General for European Funds; 2 August 2019 – 9 March 2021: (■) General Secretariat of Finance and External Relations; (■) Directorate-General for Budgets; (■) Directorate-General for Financing; (■) Directorate-General for the Treasury and Financial Policy; (■) Directorate-General for Foreign Relations; (■) Directorate-General for European Funds (until 15 Feb 2021); (■) Directorate-General for Local Cooperation and Heritage (until 15 Feb 2021); 9 March 2021 – 10 July 2023: (■) General Secretariat of Finance and External Relations; (■) Directorate-General for Budgets; (■) Directorate-General for Financing; (■) Directorate-General for the Treasury, Financial Policy and Heritage; (■) Directorate-General for Foreign Relations					
=== Ministry of Economic Model, Tourism and Labour ===
Ministry of Economic Model, Tourism and Labour (Conselleria de Model Econòmic, Turisme i Treball)		Iago Negueruela	3 July 2019	10 July 2023	PSIB–PSOE	
Ministry of Economic Model, Tourism and Labour (Conselleria de Model Econòmic, Turisme i Treball)	3 July 2019 – 10 July 2023: (■) General Secretariat of Economic Model, Tourism and Labour; (■) Directorate-General for Economic Model and Employment; (■) Directorate-General for Tourism; (■) Directorate-General for Labour and Occupational Health; (■) Directorate-General for Economic Promotion, Entrepreneurship and Social and Circular Economy					
=== Ministry of Social Affairs and Sports ===
Ministry of Social Affairs and Sports (Conselleria d'Afers Socials i Esports)		Fina Santiago	3 July 2019	10 July 2023	Més	
Ministry of Social Affairs and Sports (Conselleria d'Afers Socials i Esports)	3–5 July 2019: (■) General Secretariat of Social Affairs and Sports; (■) Directorate-General for Planning and Social Services; (■) Directorate-General for Dependency; (■) Directorate-General for Children, Families and Youth; (■) Directorate-General for Cooperation; (■) Directorate-General for Sports; 5 July 2019 – 10 July 2023: (■) General Secretariat of Social Affairs and Sports; (■) Directorate-General for Planning, Equipment and Training; (■) Directorate-General for Childhood, Youth and Families; (■) Directorate-General for Sports; (■) Directorate-General for Social Services; (■) Directorate-General for Dependency Care; (■) Directorate-General for Cooperation					
=== Ministry of Education ===
Ministry of Education, University and Research (Conselleria d'Educació, Universitat i Recerca) (until 14 February 2021) Ministry of Education and Vocational Training (Conselleria d'Educació i Formació Professional) (from 14 February 2021)		Martí March	3 July 2019	10 July 2023	PSIB–PSOE (Independent)	
Ministry of Education, University and Research (Conselleria d'Educació, Universitat i Recerca) (until 14 February 2021) Ministry of Education and Vocational Training (Conselleria d'Educació i Formació Professional) (from 14 February 2021)	3 July 2019 – 15 February 2021: (■) General Secretariat of Education, University and Research; (■) Regional Secretariat for University and Research; (■) Directorate-General for University Policy and Research; (■) Directorate-General for Language Policy; (■) Directorate-General for Planning, Organization and Centres; (■) Directorate-General for Teaching Staff; (■) Directorate-General for Vocational Training and Special Regime Education (until 2 Aug 2019); (■) Directorate-General for Vocational Training and Higher Artistic Education (from 2 Aug 2019); (■) Directorate-General for Early Childhood, Innovation and Educational Community; 15 February 2021 – 10 July 2023: (■) General Secretariat of Education and Vocational Training; (■) Directorate-General for Planning, Organization and Centres; (■) Directorate-General for Teaching Staff; (■) Directorate-General for Vocational Training and Higher Artistic Education; (■) Directorate-General for Early Childhood, Innovation and Educational Community					
=== Ministry of Health and Consumer Affairs ===
Ministry of Health and Consumer Affairs (Conselleria de Salut i Consum)		Patricia Gómez	3 July 2019	10 July 2023	PSIB–PSOE	
Ministry of Health and Consumer Affairs (Conselleria de Salut i Consum)	3 July 2019 – 10 July 2023: (■) General Secretariat of Health and Consumer Affairs; (■) Directorate-General for Benefits and Pharmacy; (■) Directorate-General for Public Health (until 2 Aug 2019); (■) Directorate-General for Public Health and Participation (from 2 Aug 2019); (■) Directorate-General for Health Research, Training and Accreditation; (■) Directorate-General for Consumer Affairs					
=== Ministry of European Funds, University and Culture ===
Ministry of European Funds, University and Culture (Conselleria de Fons Europeus, Universitat i Cultura) (from 14 February 2021)		Miquel Company	14 February 2021	10 July 2023	PSIB–PSOE	
Ministry of European Funds, University and Culture (Conselleria de Fons Europeus, Universitat i Cultura) (from 14 February 2021)	15 February 2021 – 10 July 2023: (■) General Secretariat of European Funds, University and Culture; (■) Regional Secretariat for University, Research and Language Policy; (■) Directorate-General for University Policy and Research; (■) Directorate-General for Language Policy; (■) Directorate-General for European Funds; (■) Directorate-General for Modernization and Digital Administration; (■) Directorate-General for Culture					
=== Ministry of Mobility and Housing ===
Ministry of Mobility and Housing (Conselleria de Mobilitat i Habitatge)		Marc Pons	3 July 2019	14 February 2021	PSIB–PSOE	
Ministry of Mobility and Housing (Conselleria de Mobilitat i Habitatge)		Josep Marí	14 February 2021	10 July 2023	PSIB–PSOE	
Ministry of Mobility and Housing (Conselleria de Mobilitat i Habitatge)	3 July 2019 – 15 February 2021: (■) General Secretariat of Mobility and Housing; (■) Directorate-General for Sea and Air Transport; (■) Directorate-General for Housing (until 15 Feb 2021); (■) Directorate-General for Housing and Architecture (from 15 Feb 2021); (■) Directorate-General for Mobility and Land Transport; (■) Directorate-General for Architecture and Rehabilitation (until 15 Feb 2021); 15 February 2021 – 10 July 2023: (■) General Secretariat of Mobility and Housing; (■) Directorate-General for Sea and Air Transport; (■) Directorate-General for Housing and Architecture; (■) Directorate-General for Mobility and Land Transport					
=== Ministry of Environment and Territory ===
Ministry of Environment and Territory (Conselleria de Medi Ambient i Territori)		Miquel Mir	3 July 2019	10 July 2023	Més	
Ministry of Environment and Territory (Conselleria de Medi Ambient i Territori)	3 July 2019 – 10 July 2023: (■) General Secretariat of Environment and Territory; (■) Directorate-General for Natural Areas and Biodiversity; (■) Directorate-General for Waste and Environmental Education; (■) Directorate-General for Water Resources; (■) Directorate-General for Territory and Landscape					
=== Ministry of Agriculture, Fisheries and Food ===
Ministry of Agriculture, Fisheries and Food (Conselleria d'Agricultura, Pesca i Alimentació)		Mae de la Concha	3 July 2019	10 July 2023	Unidas Podemos (Podem)	
Ministry of Agriculture, Fisheries and Food (Conselleria d'Agricultura, Pesca i Alimentació)	3 July 2019 – 10 July 2023: (■) General Secretariat of Agriculture, Fisheries and Food; (■) Directorate-General for Agriculture, Livestock and Rural Development; (■) Directorate-General for Fisheries and Marine Environment; (■) Directorate-General for Policies for Food Sovereignty					
=== Ministry of Public Administrations and Modernization ===
Ministry of Public Administrations and Modernization (Conselleria d'Administracions Públiques i Modernització) (until 14 February 2021)		Isabel Castro	3 July 2019	14 February 2021	PSIB–PSOE	
Ministry of Public Administrations and Modernization (Conselleria d'Administracions Públiques i Modernització) (until 14 February 2021)	3 July 2021 – 14 February 2021: (■) General Secretariat of Public Administrations and Modernization; (■) Regional Secretariat for Democratic Memory and Good Governance; (■) Directorate-General for Democratic Memory; (■) Directorate-General for Transparency and Good Governance; (■) Directorate-General for Participation and Volunteering; (■) Directorate-General for Civil Service and Public Administrations; (■) Directorate-General for Modernization and Digital Administration; (■) Directorate-General for Emergencies and the Interior					
=== Spokesperson of the Government ===
Spokesperson of the Government (Portaveu del Govern)		Pilar Costa	3 July 2019	14 February 2021	PSIB–PSOE	
Spokesperson of the Government (Portaveu del Govern)		Iago Negueruela	14 February 2021	10 July 2023	PSIB–PSOE	

== Notes ==
Preceded by Armengol I	Government of the Balearic Islands; 2019–2023	Succeeded by Prohens
