= Government of Marga Prohens =

- 12th Government of the Balearic Islands
- 2023–present
- Date formed: 10 July 2023

People and organisations
- Monarch: Felipe VI
- President: Marga Prohens
- Vice President: Antoni Costa
- No. of ministers: 10 (Note: Does not include the President.)
- Total no. of members: 10
- Member parties: PP
- Status in legislature: Minority government
- Opposition party: PSIB–PSOE
- Opposition leader: Iago Negueruela

History
- Election: 2023 regional election
- Legislature term: 11th Parliament
- Budget: 2024, 2025
- Predecessor: Armengol II

The government of Marga Prohens was formed on 10 July 2023, following the latter's election as President of the Balearic Islands by the Parliament of the Balearic Islands on 6 July and her swearing-in on 7 July, as a result of the People's Party (PP) emerging as the largest parliamentary force at the 2023 regional election. It succeeded the second Armengol government and is the incumbent Government of the Balearic Islands since 10 July 2023, a total of 920 days, or 2 years, 6 months and 5 days.

The cabinet comprises members of the PP, as well as an independent. The government received the external support of far-right Vox. The left-of-centre Socialist Party of the Balearic Islands (PSIB–PSOE), More for Mallorca (Més), More for Menorca (MxMe) and United We Can opposed the formation of the government.

== Investiture ==
Investiture; Marga Prohens (PP)
Ballot →	4 July 2023	6 July 2023
Required majority →	30 out of 59	Simple
Yes: • PP (25); • Sa Unió (1)	26 / 59	26 / 59
No: • PSIB–PSOE (18); • Més (4); • MxMe (2); • EUIB–Podemos (1)	25 / 59	25 / 59
Abstentions: • Vox (8)	8 / 59	8 / 59
Absentees	0 / 59	0 / 59

== Council of Government ==
The Government of the Balearic Islands is structured into the offices for the president, the vice president, 10 ministries and the post of the spokesperson of the Government.

← Prohens Government → (10 July 2023 – present)
Portfolio	Name	Party	Took office	Left office	Ref.
President	Marga Prohens	PP	7 July 2023	Incumbent	
Vice President; Minister of Economy, Finance and Innovation; Spokesperson of the Government	Antoni Costa	PP	10 July 2023	Incumbent	
Minister of the Presidency and Public Administrations	Antònia Maria Estarellas	PP	10 July 2023	12 July 2025	
Minister of Business, Employment and Energy	Alejandro Sáenz de San Pedro	PP (Ind.)	10 July 2023	12 July 2025	
Minister of Health	Manuela García	PP	10 July 2023	Incumbent	
Minister of Education and Universities	Antoni Vera	PP	10 July 2023	Incumbent	
Minister of Housing, Territory and Mobility	Marta Vidal	PP	10 July 2023	19 July 2024	
Minister of Tourism, Culture and Sports	Jaume Bauzá	PP	10 July 2023	Incumbent	
Minister of Families and Social Affairs	Catalina Cirer	PP	10 July 2023	12 July 2025	
Minister of the Sea and Water Cycle	Juan Manuel Lafuente	PP	10 July 2023	Incumbent	
Minister of Agriculture, Fisheries and Natural Environment	Joan Simonet	PP	10 July 2023	Incumbent	
=== Changes July 2024 ===
Portfolio	Name	Party	Took office	Left office	Ref.
Minister of Housing, Territory and Mobility	José Luis Mateo	PP	19 July 2024	Incumbent	
=== Changes July 2025 ===
Portfolio	Name	Party	Took office	Left office	Ref.
Second Vice President (Note: Department of new creation.); Minister of the Presidency and Government Action Coordination and Local Cooperation (Note: On 12 July 2025, the ministries of the Presidency and Public Administrations, Business, Employment and Energy and Families and Social Affairs were rebranded as the Presidency and Government Action Coordination and Local Cooperation, Business, Freelancers and Energy and Families, Social Welfare and Care of Dependent Adults departments, respectively.)	Antònia Maria Estarellas	PP	12 July 2025	Incumbent	
Minister of Business, Freelancers and Energy	Alejandro Sáenz de San Pedro	PP (Ind.)	12 July 2025	Incumbent	
Families, Social Welfare and Care of Dependent Adults	Sandra Fernández	PP	12 July 2025	Incumbent	
Minister of Labour, Civil Service and Social Debate	Catalina Cabrer	PP	12 July 2025	Incumbent	

== Notes ==
Preceded by Armengol II	Government of the Balearic Islands; 2023–present	Incumbent
