= Armengol government =

The term Armengol government may refer to:

- First government of Francina Armengol, the government of the Balearic Islands under Francina Armengol from 2015 to 2019.
- Second government of Francina Armengol, the government of the Balearic Islands under Francina Armengol from 2019.
