= Rosario Sánchez =

Rosario Sánchez may refer to:

- Rosario Sánchez (politician) (born 1976), Spanish politician
- Rosario Sánchez (race walker) (born 1973), Mexican race walker
- Rosario Sánchez Mora (1919–2008), Spanish Civil War veteran
