= Més =

Més may refer to:

- Més per Mallorca
- Més per Menorca
