= Rosario Sánchez (politician) =

Spanish politician (born 1976)

Rosario Sánchez Grau (born 1976) is a Spanish politician. A member of the Spanish Socialist Workers' Party (PSOE), she was the government delegate to the Balearic Islands from 2018 to 2019, the minister of finance and external relations of the Government of the Balearic Islands from 2019 to 2023, and the secretary of state for tourism from 2024.

== Biography ==
Born in Palma de Mallorca, Sánchez graduated in economics and business administration from the Pompeu Fabra University. From 2004 to 2007 she was a civil servant in the Balearic Islands, and from 2007 to 2011 she was director of finance and budgets for the Island Council of Mallorca. In July 2015 she was named secretary general of the Balearic Ministry of Health, and a year later director of the Department of Cooperation. In June 2018, after the Spanish Socialist Workers' Party (PSOE) became the national governing party, she was named government delegate to the Balearic Islands.

After the 2019 Balearic regional election, Francina Armengol formed her second PSOE-led government, with Sánchez in charge of the treasury and external relations. She was second on the PSOE list for Palma in the 2023 Spanish local elections; list leader José Hila left weeks later when elected to the Senate, so she led the opposition to mayor Jaime Martínez of the People's Party. She left local politics in April 2024, when she was named secretary of state for tourism. In June 2026, she was named as the PSOE's lead candidate in the 2027 Balearic regional election, while Armengol remained secretary general of the Socialist Party of the Balearic Islands (PSIB).
