= Mae de la Concha =

Spanish politician (born 1954)

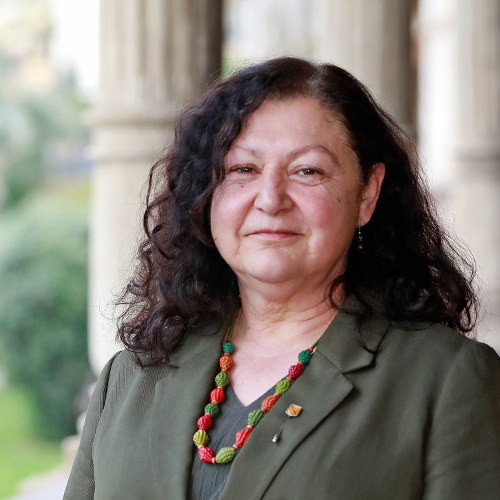
- de la Concha in 2021

President of the Balearic Islands
- Acting
- In office 19 June 2023 – 7 July 2023
- Monarch: Felipe VI
- Deputy: Juan Pedro Yllanes
- Preceded by: Francina Armengol
- Succeeded by: Marga Prohens

Minister of Agriculture, Fisheries and Food of the Balearic Islands
- In office 3 July 2019 – 10 July 2023
- President: Francina Armengol (2019–2023); Herself (acting) (2023)
- Preceded by: Vicenç Vidal (Environment, Agriculture and Fisheries)
- Succeeded by: Joan Simonet (Agriculture, Fisheries and Natural Environment)

Secretary-general of We Can Balearic Islands
- In office 5 October 2017 – 22 December 2021
- Preceded by: Alberto Jarabo
- Succeeded by: Antònia Jover

Member of the Congress of Deputies
- In office 19 July 2016 – 5 March 2019
- In office 13 January 2016 – 3 May 2016
- Constituency: Balearic Islands

Personal details
- Born: María Asunción Jacoba Pía de la Concha García-Mauriño; 25 July 1954 (age 71) Gijón, Spain
- Party: Podemos

María Asunción Jacoba Pía de la Concha García-Mauriño, known as Mae de la Concha (born 25 July 1954), is a Spanish bookseller and politician. She was regional minister of agriculture, fisheries and food of the government of the Balearic Islands. She was a member of Congress of Deputies from 2016 to 2019. From October 2017 to December 2021 she also served as secretary-general of the Balearic branch of Podemos. She was acting President of the Balearic Islands from 19 June to 7 July 2023.

== Biography ==
She started working as a court secretary until 1990, when she founded the La Torre de Papel bookstore. In February 2015 she was elected secretary-general of Podemos Menorca. She was elected to the Congress of Deputies in 2015 and 2016.

On 20 June 2023, following the resignation of Francina Armengol, she was appointed President of the Balearic Islands as the oldest person of Armengol's cabinet.
