= Antoni Noguera =

Spanish politician

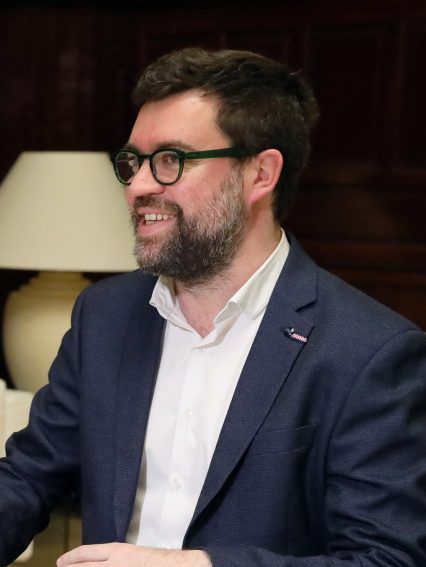

Antoni Noguera Ortega (born 27 December 1979) is a Spanish politician of the party Més per Mallorca. He was a city councillor Palma de Mallorca from 2011 to 2023, and the mayor from 2017 to 2019. He was coordinator of his party between 2019 and 2021.

== Biography ==
Noguera grew up in the Pere Barau neighbourhood of Palma de Mallorca. From 2006 to 2008 he was secretary general of the Joves d'Esquerra Nacionalista, the youth wing of the Socialist Party of Majorca (PSM). On 12 October 2006, he led the group in a protest against the National Day of Spain, saying "we have nothing to celebrate, because the Spanish state has dedicated all of its history to violently colonising countries of Latin America and the Catalan Countries, that is to say, all those countries that had a very important historic past".

In 2010, Noguera was named coordinator of culture and youth by the council of his hometown of Palma de Mallorca. Running in third place on the list of the PSM, IniciativaVerds (IV), and Entesa per Mallorca (ExM), he was elected to the council in 2011, as the youngest councillor on an opposition party in that term. He made proposals regarding culture and tourism, which were approved by the People's Party (PP)-led local government.

Noguera was the Més per Mallorca candidate for mayor of Palma in the 2015 local elections. The Spanish Socialist Workers' Party (PSOE), Més, and Podemos formed a pact in which José Hila of the PSOE would be mayor for the first two years and Noguera for the latter two, with Podemos's Miquel Comas holding the spokesperson's role. Noguera was in charge of city planning in Hila's administration. On 30 June 2017, Noguera was sworn in as Palma's first mayor from Més or its predecessors.

In April 2018, effective from June, Noguera's administration passed a ban on holiday rentals within multi-residence buildings, excluding houses unless in protected areas. Habtur, an organisation representing the interests of holiday rentals, appealed to the High Court of Justice of the Balearic Islands, which reversed the prohibition in September 2021. In February 2023, the Supreme Court of Spain decided in favour of the city council and reinstated the ban.

In the 2019 local elections, the three-party government in Palma was renewed, with Hila returning as mayor. Noguera was put in charge of culture and welfare. In November 2019, Noguera was elected coordinator of Més for a two-year term, with 87% of the 262 votes, while the party had 2,500 members eligible to vote.

Noguera said in October 2021 that he doubted he would run for any office in 2023. He did run in the 2023 local elections, but in 29th place on the Més list, which would have required a hegemonic victory for him to be re-elected.
