= Joves d'Esquerra Nacionalista =

Political party

Nationalist Left Youth Joves d'Esquerra Nacionalista
- Founded: 1987
- Headquarters: C/Isidoro Antillón, nº 9, baixos, 07006 - Palma, Balearic Islands, Spain
- Ideology: Socialism; Catalan independentism Republicanism; Feminism; Ecologism; Pacifism; Antifascism
- Mother party: Partit Socialista de Mallorca (PSM)
- International affiliation: European Free Alliance Youth (EFAy)
- Website: www.jen.cat

The Nationalist Left Youth (Catalan: Joves d'Esquerra Nacionalista, JEN) is the youth wing of the Socialist Party of Majorca (Catalan: Partit Socialista de Mallorca, PSM), a nationalist political party in the Balearic Islands. The JEN was founded in 1987 and defines itself as an independentist, socialist, ecologist and feminist organisation.

On June 22, 2010, it celebrated its Xth Congress in Inca, where Lluís Apesteguia was elected secretary general. He was reelected at the XIth Congress celebrated on April 14, 2012, in Palma. It is a member of the European Free Alliance Youth since April 2007 when it was admitted as a full member.

The JEN-PSM is led by the Executive Commission, its executive branch, consisting of ten members elected in the party congress for a period of two years with an additional number of members representing local branches. The current executive commission was elected on April 14, 2012, at the 11th Congress in Palma.

== General secretaries ==
1. Bernat Aguiló (1987 - 1989)
2. Roger Gotarredona (1990 - 1992)
3. Magí Moranta (1993 - 1995)
4. Joan Josep Mas (1996 - 2001)
5. Joan Serra (2001 - 2003)
6. Josep Ferrà (2003 - 2005)
7. Francesc Garcies(2005 - 2006)
8. Antoni Noguera (2006 - 2008)
9. Joan Ferrà(2008 - 2010)
10. Lluís Apesteguia(2010 - 2013)
11. Àlex Moll (2013 - 2014)
12. Albert Abad (2014 -)

== Executive commission ==
The current executive commission was elected in September 2014 for a two-year period ending in late 2016. These are its members:

Secretary general: Albert Abad Pérez
Secretary of organisation: Guillem Caballero Aycart
Members of the commission:

- Andrea Cañal
- Leire Giral
- Marta Jordà
- Pere Joan Llompart
- Josep Miquel Miró
- Jaume Palou
