= Antoni Costa =

Spanish politician (born 1976)

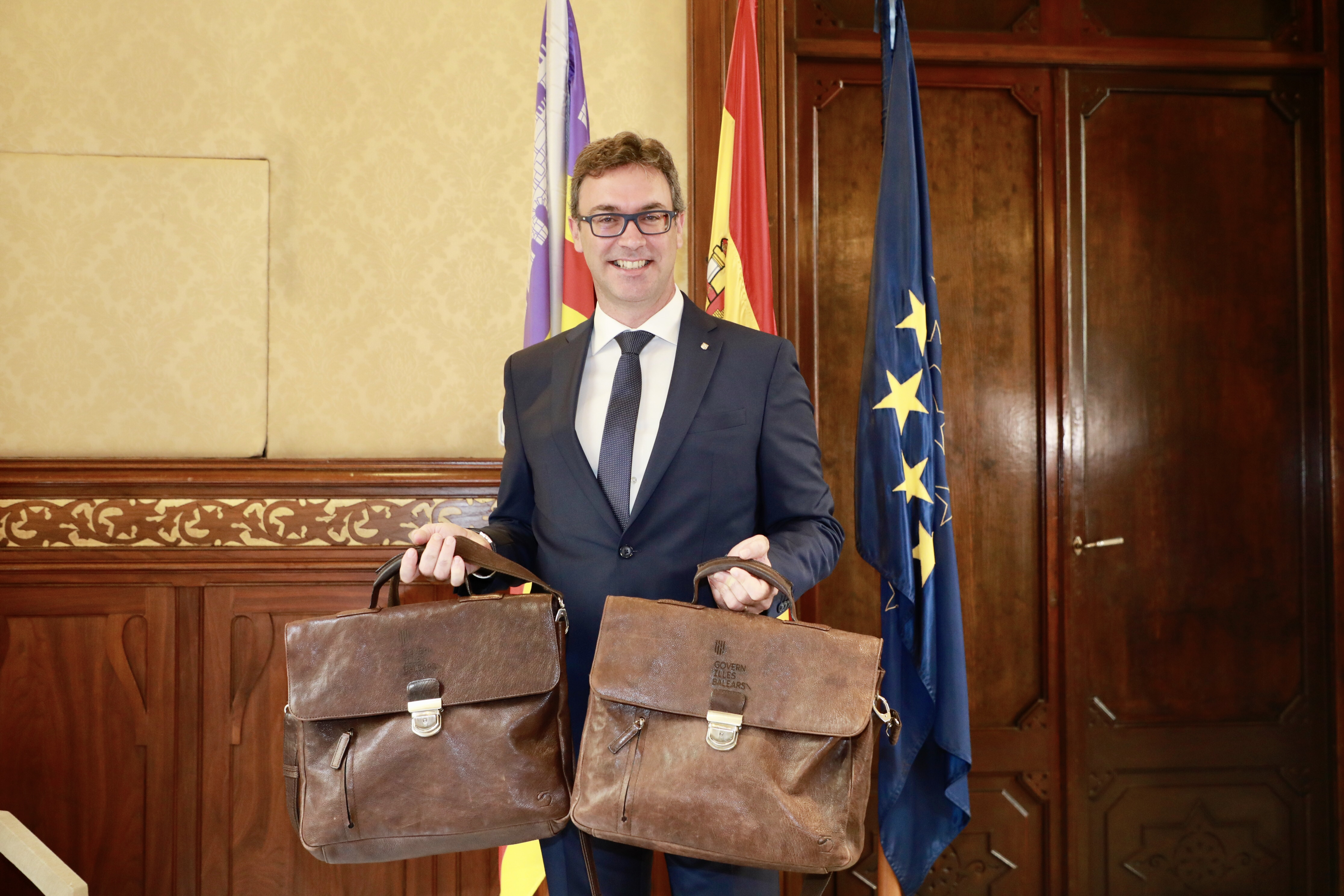
- Costa in 2023

Vice President of the Balearic Islands
- Incumbent
- Assumed office 10 July 2023
- President: Marga Prohens
- Preceded by: Juan Pedro Yllanes

Personal details
- Born: 1976 (age 49–50)
- Party: People's Party

Antoni Costa Costa (born 1976) is a Spanish politician serving as vice president of the Balearic Islands and as minister of economy, finance and innovation since 2023. From 2021 to 2023, he served as spokesperson of the People's Party in the Parliament of the Balearic Islands.
