= José Hila =

Spanish politician

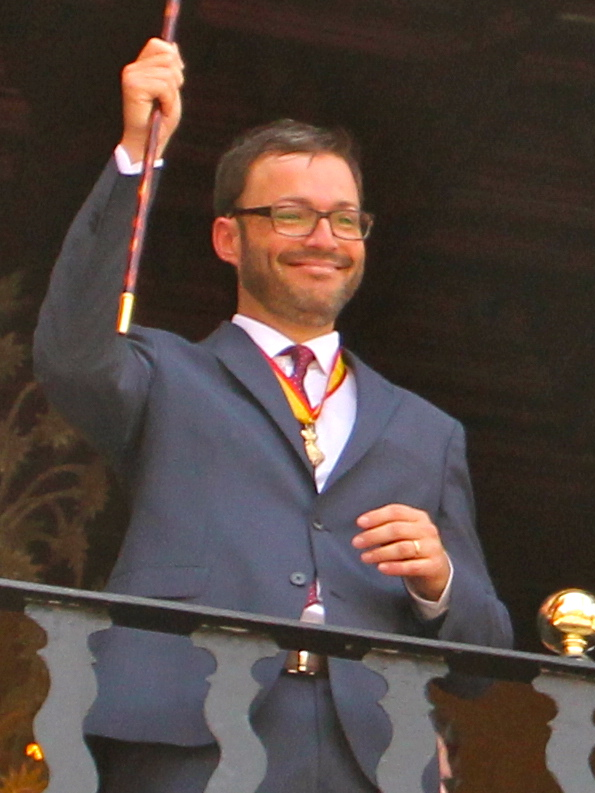
Hila in his inauguration in 2015

José Francisco Hila Vargas (born 1972) is a Spanish Socialist Workers' Party (PSOE) politician. He was elected to Palma de Mallorca City Council in 2007, and was mayor in 2015–2017 and 2019–2023. In 2023, he was named to the Senate of Spain by the Parliament of the Balearic Islands.

== Biography ==
=== Early life and career ===
Born in the working-class neighbourhood of Son Gotleu, Hila graduated in economics. In 2007, he was elected to the City Council. He was a deputy mayor to Aina Calvo from 2007 to 2011.

=== Mayor of Palma ===
In December 2014, Hila succeeded Calvo as lead candidate for the PSOE in Palma, with 63% of the votes. In the elections of June 2015, his party won six seats, while Més per Mallorca and Podemos took five each; they formed a coalition and installed him as mayor, with the agreement to pass the role onto Antoni Noguera of Més halfway through the term in 2017.

In the 2019 elections, Hila returned to being mayor, after forming a government with the same two parties and delegating certain policy areas to them. He pledged to take action on housing, and to improve public transport and green areas.

In March 2021, Hila attracted scrutiny for having cited the Law of Historical Memory to change the names of three streets he believed to have connotations to Francoist Spain. The streets honoured the Admirals Churruca, Gravina and Cervera, all of whom died decades before the Spanish Civil War. Hila believed that the streets were named after ships of the same name, used – not exclusively – by the Nationalists of the war. He later reversed his decision. A proposal was also reversed on renaming a street named after Toledo, due to it being the site of a battle won by the Nationalists.

=== Opposition and senator ===
In the 2023 elections, Hila was defeated and passed to being leader of the opposition, as Jaime Martínez Llabrés of the People's Party (PP) became mayor. Weeks later, he was elected to the Senate of Spain when designated by his party co-members in the Parliament of the Balearic Islands.
