= Lluís Apesteguia =

Spanish politician (born 1985)

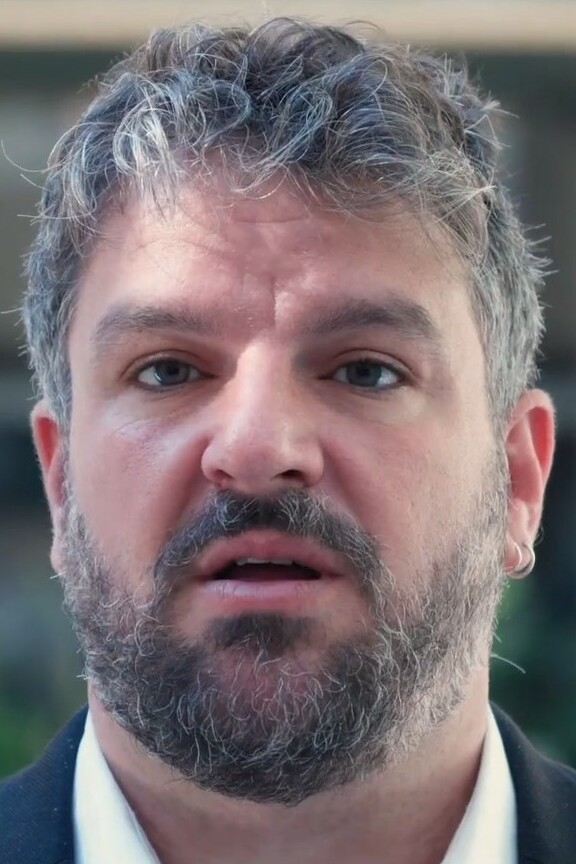

Lluís Enric Apesteguia Ripoll (born 1985) is a Spanish politician of the party Més per Mallorca. He has been a councillor (2011–) and the mayor (2019–) of his hometown of Deià, as well as his party's spokesperson in the Island Council of Mallorca (2015–2018). He led the party in the 2023 Balearic regional election, where they retained their four seats.

== Biography ==
Born in Deià, Mallorca, Apesteguia graduated in Classics from the University of Barcelona, and taught Latin and Ancient Greek at secondary school.

Apesteguia was voted onto his hometown's council in 2011 as the leader of the independent progressive party Agrupació Deià, becoming leader of the opposition in the seven-person council led by the People's Party (PP). He retained this position in the 2015 election and four years later, he became the town's first mayor from the left; this was achieved with the unanimous vote of the five councillors from his party and the two opposition members from Proposta per les Illes (El Pi).

Apesteguia joined the Socialist Party of Majorca (PSM) at the age of 18, and was the secretary general of its youth wing the Joves d'Esquerra Nacionalista from 2010 to 2013. He was elected to the Island Council of Mallorca in 2015 as the spokesperson for Més per Mallorca, leaving in January 2018 to be chief of cabinet in the Ministry of Tourism in the Government of the Balearic Islands under new minister Bel Busquets.

In October 2021, Apesteguia won the primary to be the leader of Més in the 2023 Balearic regional election, taking 56.6% of the votes. His opponent was Maria Ramon, the mayor of Esporles, who was endorsed by the party's executive. Despite the vote share dropping from 9.18% to 8.27%, the party retained its four seats in the Parliament of the Balearic Islands.
