= 2023 Balearic regional election =

Election in the Spanish region of the Balearic Islands

- 28 May 2023

All 59 seats in the Parliament of the Balearic Islands 30 seats needed for a majority
- Opinion polls
- Registered: 828,278 ▲3.3%
- Turnout: 456,505 (55.1%) ▲1.2 pp
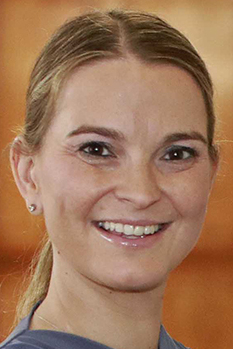

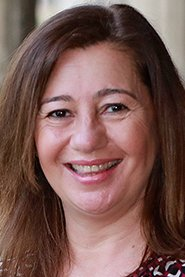

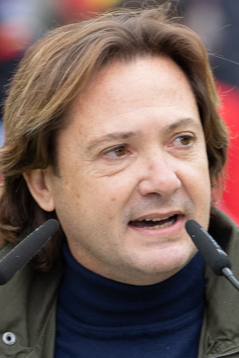

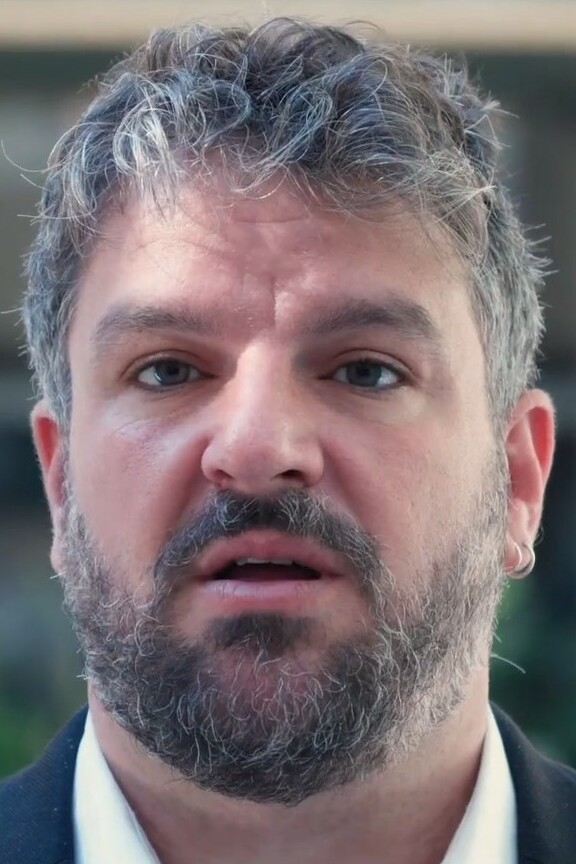

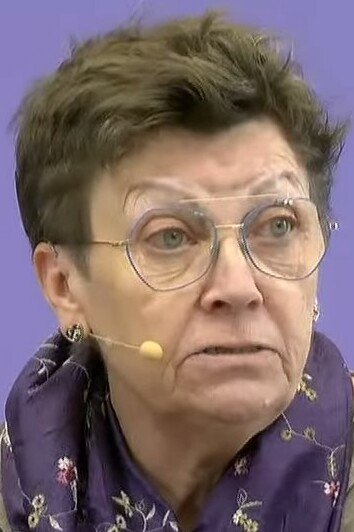

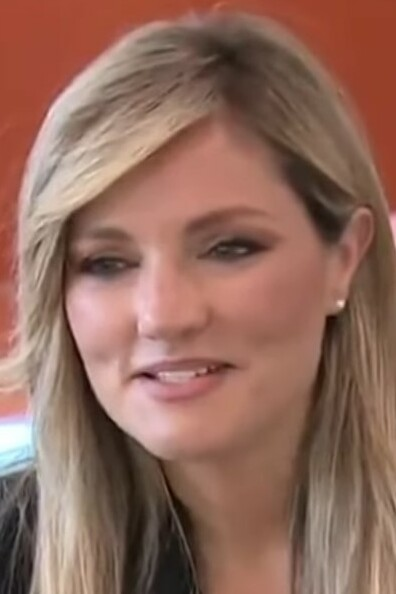
	First party	Second party	Third party
Leader	Marga Prohens	Francina Armengol	Jorge Campos
Party	PP	PSIB–PSOE	Vox
Leader since	24 July 2021	25 February 2012	1 April 2019
Leader's seat	Mallorca	Mallorca	Mallorca
Last election	16 seats, 22.2%	19 seats, 27.4%	3 seats, 8.1%
Seats won	25	18	8
Seat change	▲9	▼1	▲5
Popular vote	161,267	119,540	62,637
Percentage	35.8%	26.5%	13.9%
Swing	▲13.6 pp	▼0.9 pp	▲5.8 pp
	Fourth party	Fifth party	Sixth party
Leader	Lluís Apesteguia	Josep Castells	Antònia Jover
Party	Més	MxMe	EUIB–Podemos
Leader since	24 October 2021	16 December 2018	4 November 2022
Leader's seat	Mallorca	Menorca	Mallorca (lost)
Last election	4 seats, 9.2%	2 seats, 1.4%	6 seats, 9.7%
Seats won	4	2	1
Seat change	0	0	▼5
Popular vote	37,651	6,486	19,980
Percentage	8.4%	1.4%	4.4%
Swing	▼0.8 pp	0.0 pp	▼5.3 pp
	Seventh party	Eighth party	Ninth party
Leader	Llorenç Córdoba	Josep Melià	Patricia Guasp
Party	Sa Unió	El Pi	CS
Leader since	6 March 2023	26 November 2022	28 September 2020
Leader's seat	Formentera	Mallorca (lost)	Mallorca (lost)
Last election	0 seats, 0.3%	3 seats, 7.3%	5 seats, 9.9%
Seats won	1	0	0
Seat change	▲1	▼3	▼4
Popular vote	1,747	17,089	6,097
Percentage	0.4%	3.8%	1.4%
Swing	▲0.1 pp	▼3.5 pp	▼8.5 pp
President before election
Francina Armengol
PSOE
President after election
Marga Prohens
PP

A regional election was held in the Balearic Islands on 28 May 2023 to elect the 11th Parliament of the autonomous community. All 59 seats in the Parliament were up for election. It was held concurrently with regional elections in eleven other autonomous communities and local elections all across Spain.

== Overview ==
Under the 2007 Statute of Autonomy, the Parliament of the Balearic Islands was the unicameral legislature of the homonymous autonomous community, having legislative power in devolved matters, as well as the ability to grant or withdraw confidence from a regional president. The electoral and procedural rules were supplemented by national law provisions.

=== Date ===
The term of the Parliament of the Balearic Islands expired four years after the date of its previous election, unless it was dissolved earlier. The election decree was required to be issued no later than 25 days before the scheduled expiration date of parliament and published on the following day in the Official Gazette of the Balearic Islands (BOIB), with election day taking place 54 days after the decree's publication. The previous election was held on 26 May 2019, which meant that the chamber's term would have expired on 26 May 2023. The election decree was required to be published in the BOIB no later than 2 May 2023, setting the latest possible date for election day on 25 June 2023.

The regional president had the prerogative to dissolve the Parliament of the Balearic Islands at any given time and call a snap election, provided that no motion of no confidence was in process and that dissolution did not occur before one year after a previous one under this procedure. In the event of an investiture process failing to elect a regional president within a 60-day period from the first ballot, the Parliament was to be automatically dissolved and a fresh election called.

The Parliament of the Balearic Islands was officially dissolved on 4 April 2023 with the publication of the corresponding decree in the BOIB, setting election day for 28 May.

=== Electoral system ===
Voting for the Parliament was based on universal suffrage, comprising all Spanish nationals over 18 years of age, registered in the Balearic Islands and with full political rights, provided that they had not been deprived of the right to vote by a final sentence. Amendments in 2022 abolished the "begged" voting system (Spanish: Voto rogado), under which non-resident citizens were required to apply for voting. The begged vote system was attributed responsibility for a major decrease in the turnout of Spaniards abroad during the years it was in force.

The Parliament of the Balearic Islands had 59 seats. All were elected in four multi-member constituencies—corresponding to the islands of Mallorca, Menorca, Ibiza and Formentera, each of which was assigned a fixed number of seats—using the D'Hondt method and closed-list proportional voting, with a five percent-threshold of valid votes (including blank ballots) in each constituency. The use of this electoral method resulted in a higher effective threshold depending on district magnitude and vote distribution.

As a result of the aforementioned allocation, each Parliament constituency was entitled the following seats:

Seats	Constituencies
33	Mallorca
13	Menorca
12	Ibiza
1	Formentera

The law did not provide for by-elections to fill vacant seats; instead, any vacancies arising after the proclamation of candidates and during the legislative term were filled by the next candidates on the party lists or, when required, by designated substitutes.

=== Outgoing parliament ===
The table below shows the composition of the parliamentary groups in the chamber at the time of dissolution.

Parliamentary composition in April 2023
Groups	Parties	Legislators	
Groups	Parties	Seats	Total
Socialist Parliamentary Group	PSIB–PSOE	19	19
People's Parliamentary Group	PP	16	16
United We Can Parliamentary Group	Podemos	5	6
United We Can Parliamentary Group	EM–EU	1	6
Citizens Parliamentary Group	CS	4	4
More for Mallorca Parliamentary Group	Més	4	4
Vox–ACTUA Balearics Parliamentary Group	Vox	3	3
El Pi–Proposal for the Isles Parliamentary Group	El Pi	3	3
Mixed Parliamentary Group	MxMe	2	3
Mixed Parliamentary Group	PSIB–PSOE	1 (Note: Antonio Jesús Sanz, representing the GxF+PSOE+EU coalition for the single-member constituency of Formentera.)	3
Non-Inscrits	INDEP	1 (Note: Maxo Benalal, former CS legislator.)	1

== Parties and candidates ==
The electoral law allowed for parties and federations registered in the interior ministry, alliances and groupings of electors to present lists of candidates. Parties and federations intending to form an alliance were required to inform the relevant electoral commission within 10 days of the election call, whereas groupings of electors needed to secure the signature of at least one percent of the electorate in the constituencies for which they sought election, disallowing electors from signing for more than one list. Additionally, a balanced composition of men and women was required in the electoral lists, so that candidates of either sex made up at least 40 percent of the total composition.

Below is a list of the main parties and alliances which contested the election:

Candidacy	Parties and alliances	Leading candidate	Ideology	Previous result		Gov.	Ref.
Candidacy	Parties and alliances	Leading candidate	Ideology	Vote %	Seats	Gov.	Ref.
PSIB–PSOE	List: Socialist Party of the Balearic Islands (PSIB–PSOE)	Francina Armengol	Social democracy	27.4%	19	Yes	
PP	List: People's Party (PP)	Marga Prohens	Conservatism; Christian democracy	22.2%	16	No	
CS	List: Citizens–Party of the Citizenry (CS)	Patricia Guasp	Liberalism	9.9%	5	No	
EUIB– Podemos	List: We Can (Podemos); United Left of the Balearic Islands (EUIB) – Communist Party of the Balearic Islands (PCIB) – The Dawn Marxist Organization (La Aurora (OM)) – Republican Left (IR)	Antònia Jover	Left-wing populism Direct democracy Democratic socialism	9.7%	6	Yes	
Més	List: More for Mallorca (Més); InitiativeGreens (IV); Republican Left of Catalonia (ERC)	Lluís Apesteguia	Left-wing nationalism Democratic socialism Green politics	9.2%	4	Yes	
Vox	List: Vox (Vox)	Jorge Campos	Right-wing populism Ultranationalism; National conservatism	8.1%	3	No	
El Pi	List: Proposal for the Isles (El Pi)	Josep Melià	Regionalism; Liberalism	7.3%	3	No	
MxMe	List: More for Menorca (MxMe)	Josep Castells	Left-wing nationalism Democratic socialism Green politics	1.4%	2	No	
GxF	List: People for Formentera (GxF); Socialist Party of the Balearic Islands (PSIB–PSOE) (Note: In Formentera.)	Silvia Tur	Environmentalism; Democratic socialism	0.5%	1	No	
Sa Unió	List: People's Party (PP); Commitment to Formentera (CompromísFormentera)	Llorenç Córdoba	Conservatism	0.3%	0	No	

== Campaign ==
=== Debates ===
2023 Balearic regional election debates
Date	Organizer(s)	Moderator(s)	P Present (Note: Denotes a main invitee attending the event.) S Surrogate (Note: Denotes a main invitee not attending the event, sending a surrogate in their place.) NI Non-invitee A Absent invitee										
Date	Organizer(s)	Moderator(s)	PSIB	PP	UP	CS	Més	Vox	El Pi	MxMe	GxF	Audience	Ref.
2 May	Diario de Mallorca; Fibwi TV	Marisa Goñi	P Armengol	P Prohens	P Jover	P Guasp	P Apesteguia	P Campos	P Melià	NI	NI	—	
14 May	IB3	Xavi Garcia; Neus Albis	P Armengol	P Prohens	P Jover	P Guasp	P Apesteguia	P Campos	P Melià	P Castells	P Tur	5.2% (16,000)	
15 May	Última Hora; CESAG	Nekane Domblás	S Armengol	P Prohens	P Jover	P Guasp	P Apesteguia	P Campos	P Melià	NI	NI	—	
16 May	Espai Mallorca; Passes Perdudes	Pau Torres	S Fernández	S Durán	S Sans	NI	S Matas	NI	S Mut	P Castells	S Cardona	—	
26 May	Cadena SER; El País	Juan Antonio Bauzá	S Armengol	P Prohens	P Jover	P Guasp	P Apesteguia	NI	P Melià	NI	NI	—	

== Opinion polls ==
The tables below list opinion polling results in reverse chronological order, showing the most recent first and using the dates when the survey fieldwork was done, as opposed to the date of publication. Where the fieldwork dates are unknown, the date of publication is given instead. The highest percentage figure in each polling survey is displayed with its background shaded in the leading party's colour. If a tie ensues, this is applied to the figures with the highest percentages. The "Lead" column on the right shows the percentage-point difference between the parties with the highest percentages in a poll.

=== Graphical summary ===
Local regression trend line of poll results from 26 May 2019 to 28 May 2023, with each line corresponding to a political party.

=== Voting intention estimates ===
The table below lists weighted voting intention estimates. Refusals are generally excluded from the party vote percentages, while question wording and the treatment of "don't know" responses and those not intending to vote may vary between polling organisations. When available, seat projections determined by the polling organisations are displayed below (or in place of) the percentages in a smaller font; 30 seats were required for an absolute majority in the Parliament of the Balearic Islands.

Color key:

Poll conducted after legal ban on opinion polls

Polling firm/Commissioner	Fieldwork date	Sample size	Turnout	PSIB–PSOE	PP	CS	Unidas Podemos	Més	Vox	El Pi	MxMe	GxF	Sa Unió	Lead
2023 regional election	28 May 2023	—N/a	55.1	26.5; 18	35.8; 25	1.4; 0	4.4; 1	8.4; 4	13.9; 8	3.8; 0	1.4; 2	0.4; 0	0.4; 1	9.3
IBES/IB3	22–27 May 2023	1,900	?	25.3; 17/18	31.1; 21/22	2.3; 0	7.8; 4	10.0; 4/5	14.3; 7/8	3.7; 0/2	1.2; 0	0.4; 1	–	5.8
NC Report/La Razón	22 May 2023	?	?	22.5; 15/17	34.2; 24/25	–	8.5; 4	10.1; 6	11.7; 5/6	5.9; 2/3	(Note: Within Més.)	0.4; 1	–	11.7
KeyData/Público	19 May 2023	?	55.5	24.0; 16	30.3; 22	2.3; 0	7.9; 4	9.5; 4	12.9; 7	6.5; 2	1.6; 3	0.7; 1	–	6.3
Data10/Okdiario	16–18 May 2023	1,500	?	23.8; 16	30.9; 22	–	7.6; 4	9.0; 4	13.8; 7	6.0; 2	1.9; 3	0.4; 1	–	7.1
IBES/Última Hora	12–18 May 2023	2,300	?	25.2; 17	30.7; 23	2.7; 0	7.6; 5	9.3; 4	14.4; 7	4.1; 0	1.6; 2	0.4; 1	–	5.5
EM-Analytics/El Plural	11–17 May 2023	600	?	23.7; 16	30.6; 22	2.0; 0	8.5; 5	10.3; 4	13.3; 6	6.1; 2	1.5; 3	0.5; 1	–	6.9
Gadeso/Diario de Mallorca	30 Apr–15 May 2023	2,000	?	25.4; 17/18	27.9; 21/23	2.3; 0	8.5; 4/5	9.6; 4/5	13.4; 6/7	5.2; 0/2	1.5; 3/4	–	–	2.5
EM-Analytics/El Plural	4–10 May 2023	600	?	23.6; 16	30.7; 22	2.1; 0	8.5; 5	10.2; 4	13.3; 6	6.1; 2	1.5; 3	0.5; 1	–	7.1
EM-Analytics/El Plural	26 Apr–3 May 2023	600	?	23.7; 16	30.4; 22	2.4; 0	8.6; 5	10.2; 4	13.3; 6	6.3; 2	1.5; 3	0.5; 1	–	6.7
CIS	10–26 Apr 2023	418	?	31.5	26.1	2.3	7.4	10.8	13.6	2.8	1.7	–	–	5.4
EM-Analytics/El Plural	19–25 Apr 2023	600	?	23.6; 14	30.6; 24	2.6; 0	8.5; 5	10.2; 4	13.4; 6	6.1; 2	1.5; 3	0.5; 1	–	7.0
EM-Analytics/El Plural	12–18 Apr 2023	600	?	23.4; 14	30.9; 24	2.5; 0	8.5; 5	10.1; 4	13.3; 6	6.3; 2	1.5; 3	0.6; 1	–	7.5
Simple Lógica/elDiario.es	5–18 Apr 2023	560	?	28.6; 19/20	23.6; 17/18	3.9; 0	8.7; 5	11.9; 5/6	12.4; 6/7	5.7; 2	1.3; 2	0.5; 1	–	5.0
NC Report/Mallorca Diario	11–17 Apr 2023	1,375	?	22.7; 16	33.8; 24	2.7; 0	8.1; 4	8.4; 4	11.2; 5	7.4; 3	1.3; 2	0.4; 1	–	11.1
Data10/Okdiario	12–15 Apr 2023	1,500	?	23.8; 16	30.9; 22	–	7.6; 3	9.0; 4	13.8; 7	6.0; 3	1.9; 3	0.4; 1	–	7.1
EM-Analytics/El Plural	5–11 Apr 2023	600	?	23.9; 16	30.5; 22	2.4; 0	8.5; 5	10.1; 4	12.9; 6	6.5; 2	1.6; 3	0.6; 1	–	6.6
EM-Analytics/El Plural	27 Mar–4 Apr 2023	600	?	22.5; 14	30.0; 22	2.4; 0	8.5; 5	10.2; 4	12.9; 6	6.8; 3	2.2; 4	1.2; 1	–	7.5
KeyData/Público	3 Apr 2023	?	58.0	22.8; 15	31.1; 23	2.9; 0	8.4; 4	9.7; 4	12.4; 7	6.2; 2	1.4; 3	0.4; 1	–	8.3
NC Report/La Razón	10–17 Mar 2023	?	51.3	22.4; 15	33.3; 24	–	8.8; 4	10.2; 6	10.7; 6	7.2; 3		0.4; 1	–	10.9
Data10/Okdiario	13–14 Feb 2023	1,500	?	23.3; 15	30.7; 22	3.1; 0	8.0; 4	8.9; 4	14.1; 8	5.2; 2	1.9; 3	0.4; 1	–	7.4
IBES/Última Hora	5–15 Jan 2023	1,300	?	23.6; 17/18	31.3; 21/22	3.6; 0	8.2; 5	8.0; 4	13.2; 7	4.8; 0/2	2.0; 3	0.4; 1	–	7.7
Sigma Dos/El Mundo	16–22 Dec 2022	735	?	21.7; 13/14	28.6; 23/25	3.3; 0/1	7.9; 4	11.1; 5	11.5; 5	6.9; 3	2.0; 3	0.4; 1	–	6.9
CIS (Note: Vote+Simpathy figures with undecided and/or abstentionists excluded.)	17 Nov–2 Dec 2022	234	?	37.6	25.5	3.1	10.1	5.1	5.0	3.0	1.2	–	–	12.1
Data10/Okdiario	2–4 Nov 2022	1,000	?	23.2; 15	29.7; 21	2.8; 0	8.1; 5	9.7; 4	14.5; 8	5.9; 2	1.7; 3	0.4; 1	–	6.5
IBES/Última Hora	26–30 Sep 2022	1,300	?	21.4; 14/16	29.8; 22/24	3.8; 0	10.2; 5	8.9; 3/4	15.4; 6/7	5.7; 2	1.7; 3	0.5; 1	–	8.4
IBES/Última Hora	1–10 Mar 2022	1,000	?	20.8; 13	26.1; 18	7.2; 3	12.5; 8	9.2; 4	14.6; 7	5.3; 2	1.8; 3	? 1	–	5.3
Data10/Okdiario	22–23 Sep 2021	1,000	?	25.7; 17	28.3; 21	3.2; 0	8.3; 5	9.5; 4	12.5; 7	6.4; 2	1.5; 2	0.4; 1	–	2.6
IBES/Última Hora	8–12 Jun 2021	1,000	?	24.5; 16/17	26.9; 18/20	6.8; 3/4	10.1; 5/6	8.9; 4	9.9; 4/5	6.9; 2/3	1.4; 2	? 1	–	2.4
IBES/Última Hora	8–12 Jun 2020	1,000	?	28.7; 19/21	24.2; 17/18	7.0; 3/4	9.0; 5/6	8.2; 3/4	10.4; 3/5	5.8; 2	1.3; 2	? 1	–	4.5
ElectoPanel/Electomanía	1 Apr–15 May 2020	?	?	26.8; 19	25.3; 19	5.9; 3	9.7; 5	10.4; 4	8.2; 3	7.4; 3	1.3; 2	0.6; 1	–	1.5
November 2019 general election	10 Nov 2019	—N/a	56.8	25.4 (18)	22.8 (15)	7.4 (4)	18.1 (12)	4.0 (0)	17.1 (10)	–	(Note: Within Més Esquerra.)	–	–	2.6
2019 regional election	26 May 2019	—N/a	53.9	27.4; 19	22.2; 16	9.9; 5	9.7; 6	9.2; 4	8.1; 3	7.3; 3	1.4; 2	0.5; 1	0.3; 0	5.2

=== Voting preferences ===
The table below lists raw, unweighted voting preferences.

Polling firm/Commissioner	Fieldwork date	Sample size	PSIB–PSOE	PP	CS	Unidas Podemos	Més	Vox	El Pi	MxMe	GxF	Question	X mark	Lead
2023 regional election (Note: Does not include non-resident citizens.)	28 May 2023	—N/a	14.9	20.2	0.8	2.5	4.7	7.8	2.1	0.8	0.2	—N/a	42.6	5.3
CIS	10–26 Apr 2023	418	23.4	18.8	1.3	4.5	7.5	8.8	0.5	1.3	–	26.3	4.1	4.6
CIS	17 Nov–2 Dec 2022	234	23.0	15.3	1.5	6.8	3.1	2.8	2.3	0.9	–	32.2	5.9	7.7
SocioMétrica	13–18 May 2021	1,100	11.4	15.4	–	–	–	10.1	–	–	–	–	–	4.0
November 2019 general election	10 Nov 2019	—N/a	14.8	13.3	4.3	10.5	2.3	9.9	–		–	—N/a	41.3	1.5
2019 regional election	26 May 2019	—N/a	15.1	12.3	5.5	5.4	5.1	4.5	4.1	0.8	0.3	—N/a	46.1	2.8

=== Preferred President ===
The table below lists opinion polling on leader preferences to become president of the Balearic Islands.

Polling firm/Commissioner	Fieldwork date	Sample size									Other/ None/ Not care	Question	Lead
Polling firm/Commissioner	Fieldwork date	Sample size	Armengol PSIB	Company PP	Prohens PP	Guasp CS	Yllanes UP	Ensenyat Més	Campos Vox	Amengual El Pi	Other/ None/ Not care	Question	Lead
IBES/Última Hora	8–12 Jun 2021	1,000	27.1	–	26.9	9.6	8.6	11.2	8.7	7.9	13.0		0.2
SocioMétrica	13–18 May 2021	1,100	15.5	14.9	–	–	–	–	–	–	69.6		0.6

== Results ==
=== Overall ===
← Summary of the 28 May 2023 Parliament of the Balearic Islands election results →
Parties and alliances	Popular vote			Seats	
Parties and alliances	Votes	%	±pp	Total	+/−
People's Party (PP)	161,267	35.79	+13.59	25	+9
Socialist Party of the Balearic Islands (PSIB–PSOE)	119,540	26.53	−0.84	18	−1
Vox (Vox)	62,637	13.90	+5.78	8	+5
More for Mallorca (Més)	37,651	8.35	−0.83	4	±0
United We Can (EUIB–Podemos)	19,980	4.43	−5.31	1	−5
El Pi–Proposal for the Isles (El Pi)	17,089	3.79	−3.51	0	−3
More for Menorca (MxMe)	6,486	1.44	+0.03	2	±0
Citizens–Party of the Citizenry (CS)	6,097	1.35	−8.55	0	−5
Progress in Green–PACMA (Progreso en Verde–PACMA)^{1}	4,389	0.97	−0.43	0	±0
The Union of Formentera (PP–CompromísFormentera) (Sa Unió)	1,747	0.39	+0.06	1	+1
People for Formentera+PSOE (GxF+PSOE)	1,679	0.37	−0.10	0	−1
Now Ibiza (Ara Eivissa)	1,407	0.31	+0.03	0	±0
Spanish Liberal Project (PLIE)	817	0.18	+0.08	0	±0
Coalition for the Balearics (CperB)	762	0.17	New	0	±0
EPIC Ibiza Citizen Movement–El Pi (EPIC–El Pi)^{2}	597	0.13	−0.51	0	±0
Political Reset (Reset)	509	0.11	New	0	±0
For the Balearics (PerxB)	424	0.09	New	0	±0
New National Order (Orden)	359	0.08	New	0	±0
Blank ballots	7,207	1.60	+0.59		
Total	450,644			59	±0
Valid votes	450,644	98.72	−0.58		
Invalid votes	5,861	1.28	+0.58		
Votes cast / turnout	456,505	55.11	+1.18		
Abstentions	371,773	44.89	−1.18		
Registered voters	828,278				
Sources
Footnotes: ^{1} Progress in Green–PACMA results are compared to Animalist Party Against Mistreatment of Animals totals in the 2019 election.; ^{2} EPIC Ibiza Citizen Movement–El Pi results are compared to the combined totals of Proposal for Ibiza and EPIC Ibiza Citizen Movement in the 2019 election.

Popular vote
PP	35.79%
PSIB–PSOE	26.53%
Vox–AB	13.90%
Més	8.35%
EUIB–Podemos	4.43%
El Pi	3.79%
MxMe	1.44%
CS	1.35%
Sa Unió	0.39%
Others	2.43%
Blank ballots	1.60%

Seats
PP	42.37%
PSIB–PSOE	30.51%
Vox–AB	13.56%
Més	6.78%
MxMe	3.39%
EUIB–Podemos	1.69%
Sa Unió	1.69%

=== Distribution by constituency ===
Constituency	PP		PSIB		Vox		Més		UP		MxMe		Sa Unió	
Constituency	%	S	%	S	%	S	%	S	%	S	%	S	%	S
Formentera					3.3	−							46.5	1
Ibiza	48.8	7	25.6	4	9.2	1			6.4	−				
Mallorca	34.2	13	26.9	10	15.3	6	10.4	4	4.0	−				
Menorca	38.7	5	26.7	4	7.2	1			6.8	1	16.6	2		
Total	35.8	25	26.5	18	13.9	8	8.4	4	4.4	1	1.4	2	0.4	1

== Aftermath ==
=== Government formation ===
Investiture; Nomination of Marga Prohens (PP)
Ballot →	4 July 2023	6 July 2023
Required majority →	30 out of 59	Simple
Yes: • PP (25); • Sa Unió (1)	26 / 59	26 / 59
No: • PSIB (18); • Més (4); • MxMe (2); • EUIB–Podemos (1)	25 / 59	25 / 59
Abstentions: • Vox (8)	8 / 59	8 / 59
Absentees	0 / 59	0 / 59

== Bibliography ==
- Ley Orgánica 5/1985, de 19 de junio, del Régimen Electoral General (Organic Law 5/1985). Official State Gazette (in Spanish). 19 June 1985 [version as of 3 October 2022]. BOE-A-1985-11672.
- Ley 8/1986, de 26 de noviembre, Electoral de la Comunidad Autónoma de las Islas Baleares (Law 8/1986). Official State Gazette (in Spanish). 26 November 1986 [version as of 2 February 2019]. BOE-A-1987-2903.
- Ley Orgánica 1/2007, de 28 de febrero, de reforma del Estatuto de Autonomía de las Illes Balears (Organic Law 1/2007). Official State Gazette (in Spanish). 28 February 2007 [version as of 28 December 2022]. BOE-A-2007-4233.
- Ley 1/2019, de 31 de enero, del Gobierno de las Illes Balears (Law 1/2019). Official State Gazette (in Spanish). 31 January 2019 [version as of 13 April 2023]. BOE-A-2019-2862.
- Decreto 2/2023, de 3 de abril, de la presidenta de las Illes Balears, de disolución del Parlamento de las Illes Balears y de convocatoria de elecciones (Decree 2/2023). Official Gazette of the Balearic Islands (in Spanish). 3 April 2023.
