= Francina Armengol =

Spanish politician (born 1971)

The Most Excellent Francina Armengol MP
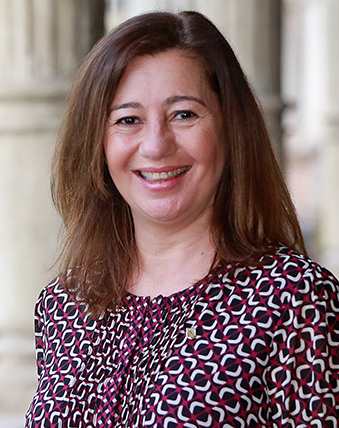
- Official portrait, 2021

President of the Congress of Deputies
- Incumbent
- Assumed office 17 August 2023
- Monarch: Felipe VI
- Preceded by: Meritxell Batet

President of the Government of the Balearic Islands
- In office 2 July 2015 – 20 June 2023
- Monarch: Felipe VI
- Deputy: Biel Barceló (2015–2017); Bel Busquets (2017–2019); Juan Pedro Yllanes (2019–2023)
- Preceded by: José Ramón Bauzà
- Succeeded by: Marga Prohens; Acting: Mae de la Concha

Secretary-General of the Socialist Party of the Balearic Islands
- Incumbent
- Assumed office 26 February 2012
- Preceded by: Francesc Antich

President of the Island Council of Mallorca
- In office 7 July 2007 – 25 June 2011
- Deputy: Antoni Pascual (2007–2010); Antoni Alemany (2010–2011)
- Preceded by: Maria Antònia Munar
- Succeeded by: Maria Salom

Member of the Congress of Deputies
- Incumbent
- Assumed office 17 August 2023
- Constituency: Balearic Islands

Member of the Parliament of the Balearic Islands
- In office 12 June 1999 – 24 July 2023
- Constituency: Mallorca

Personal details
- Born: Francesca Lluch Armengol Socias; 11 August 1971 (age 55) Inca, Mallorca, Spain
- Party: Socialist Party of the Balearic Islands
- Other political affiliations: Spanish Socialist Workers' Party
- Children: 2
- Education: University of Barcelona

Francesca Lluc Armengol Socias, known as Francina Armengol Socias (Balearic Catalan: [fɾənˈsinə əɾməŋˈgɔl soˈsi.əs]; born 11 August 1971), is a Spanish politician from the Socialist Party of the Balearic Islands. She currently serves as president of the Congress of Deputies since 2023 and as member of the Congress of Deputies from the Balearic Islands since 2023.

== Early life ==
Armengol was born on 11 August 1971 in Inca, Mallorca. She is the daughter of Juan Armengol, who was the mayor of Inca from 1991 to 1995. By 1991 she had joined the PSOE. She studied pharmacy at the University of Barcelona and then completed a postgraduate degree in dermopharmacy and law studies at the Open University of Catalonia. She was also a member of the Bloc d'Estudiants Independentistes during the time she studied pharmacy.

She first entered politics in 1997, as she was deputy secretary of the PSOE in Mallorca until 1998, and was afterward, from 1998 to 2000, councillor of Inca. She was also a member of the Parliament of the Balearic Islands starting 12 July 1999, a position she has continuously held since then. During her time in parliament, she was a coordinator of the Parity Law and was, from 2007 to 2011, President of the Island Council of Mallorca.

== Political career ==
Armengol served as president of the Balearic Islands between 2015 and 2023, and also the first woman to ever hold the office. She ruled in coalition with the left-wing Podemos and the regional Catalanist party Mes per Mallorca as well as external support from the regionalist and Catalanist Mes per Menorca Party.

In the 2023 Spanish general election Armengol was elected to the 15th Congress of Deputies representing the Balearic Islands. In August 2023, the Socialists had Armengol appointed speaker or president of the Congress of Deputies with support from Catalan pro-independence parties.

In the wake of a corruption scandal among socialist cadre like José Luis Ábalos, she is under scrutiny because of her allegedly false testament in a Spanish senate inquiry in 2023 concerning fake COVID-masks.

== Personal life ==
Armengol tested positive for COVID-19 on 20 December 2021.

Political offices
Preceded by Maria Antònia Munar	President of the Island Council of Mallorca; 2007-2011	Succeeded by Maria Salom
Preceded by José Ramón Bauzà	President of the Balearic Islands; 2015-2023	Succeeded by Mae de la Concha (acting)
Party political offices
Preceded by Francesc Antich	Leader of the Socialist Group in the Parliament of the Balearic Islands; 2004-2007	Succeeded by Antoni Diéguez
Preceded by Antoni Diéguez	Leader of the Socialist Group in the Parliament of the Balearic Islands; 2011-2015	Succeeded by Pilar Costa
Preceded by Francesc Antich	Secretary-General of the Socialist Workers' Party of the Balearic Islands; 2012-present	Incumbent
