= Iago Negueruela =

Spanish politician (born 1980)

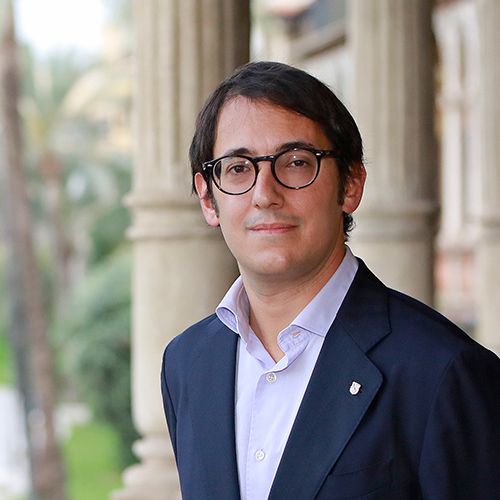
- Negueruela in 2021

Member of the Parliament of the Balearic Islands
- Incumbent
- Assumed office 26 May 2019
- Constituency: Mallorca

Personal details
- Born: 8 May 1980 (age 45)
- Party: Spanish Socialist Workers' Party

Iago Negueruela Vázquez (born 8 May 1980) is a Spanish politician serving as a member of the Parliament of the Balearic Islands since 2019. From 2015 to 2023, he served as minister of labor, trade and industry of the Balearic Islands.
