= María Salom =

Spanish politician (born 1967)

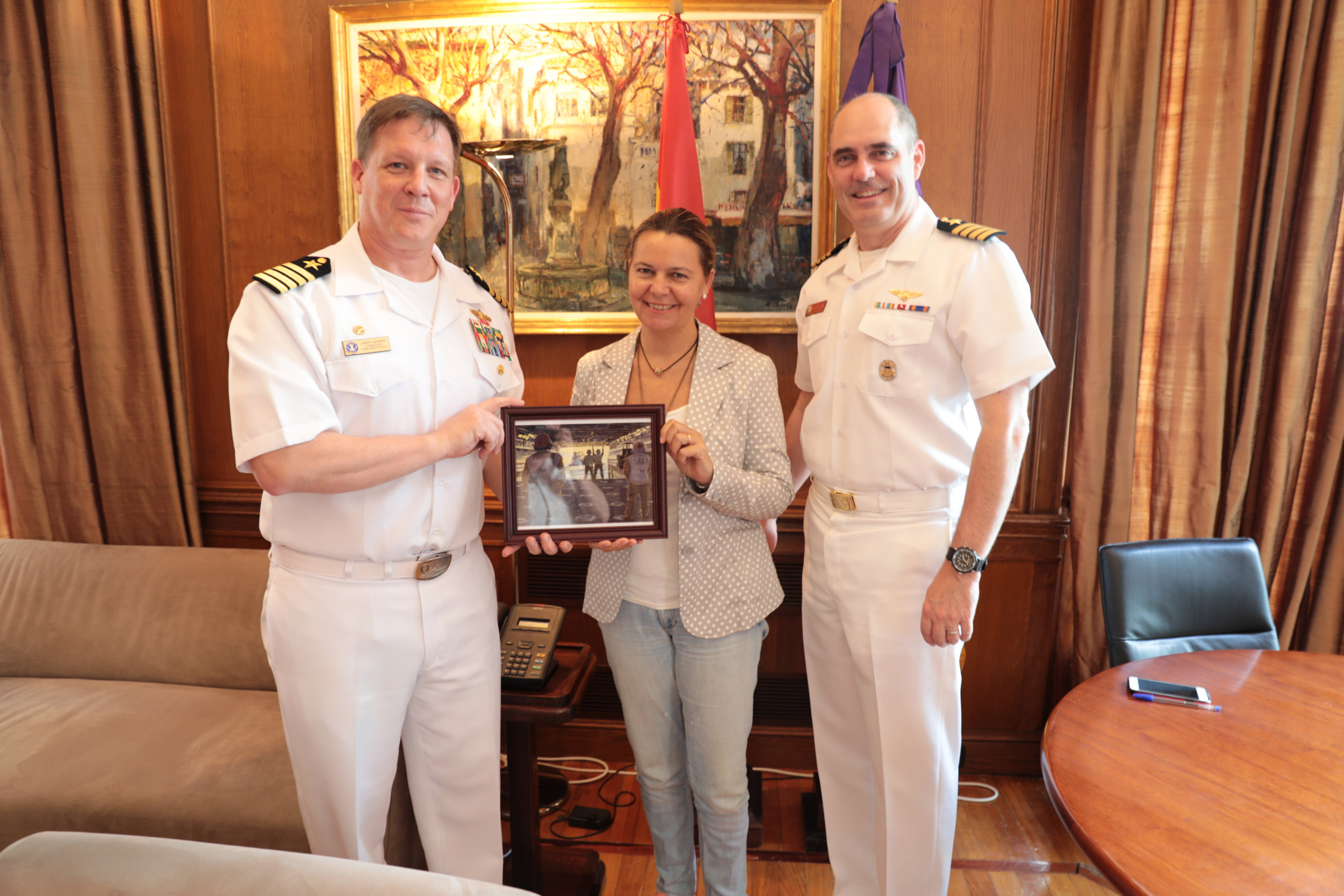
- Salom in 2017

Member of the Senate
- Incumbent
- Assumed office 28 April 2019
- Constituency: Mallorca

Member of the Congress of Deputies
- In office 20 April 2004 – 27 May 2011
- Succeeded by: Carme Feliu Álvarez de Sotomayor
- Constituency: Balearic Islands

Personal details
- Born: 5 December 1967 (age 58)
- Party: People's Party

María Salom Coll (born 5 December 1967) is a Spanish politician serving as a member of the Senate since 2019. From 2004 to 2011, she was a member of the Congress of Deputies. From 2011 to 2015, she served as president of the insular council of Mallorca.
