= Gabriel Le Senne =

Spanish politician (born 1977)

President of the Parliament of the Balearic Islands
- Incumbent
- Assumed office 20 June 2023
- Preceded by: Vicenç Thomàs

Personal details
- Born: 27 June 1977 (age 48)
- Party: Vox

Gabriel Antonio Le Senne Presedo (born 27 June 1977) is a Spanish politician serving as a president of the Parliament of the Balearic Islands since 2023. He has served as president of Vox in the Balearic Islands since 2025.
