= Marga Prohens =

Spanish politician (born 1982)

The Most Excellent Marga Prohens
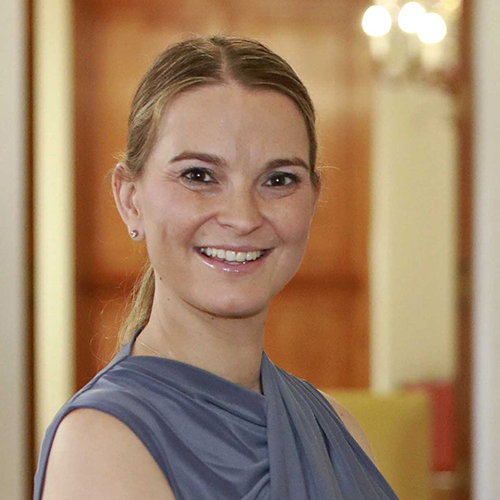

President of the Government of the Balearic Islands
- Incumbent
- Assumed office 7 July 2023
- Monarch: Felipe VI
- Preceded by: Mae de la Concha (acting)

Member of the Congress of Deputies
- In office 21 May 2019 – 29 May 2023
- Constituency: Balearic Islands

Member of the Parliament of the Balearic Islands
- Incumbent
- Assumed office 20 June 2023
- Constituency: Mallorca
- In office 18 June 2011 – 21 May 2019
- Constituency: Mallorca

Personal details
- Born: Margalida Prohens Rigo; 24 May 1982 (age 44) Campos, Mallorca (Balearic Islands), Spain
- Party: PP
- Education: Pompeu Fabra University

Margalida "Marga" Prohens Rigo (Balearic Catalan: [ˈmaɾɣə pɾoˈɛnz ˈriɣo]; born 24 May 1982) is a Spanish People's Party (PP) politician. She served in the Parliament of the Balearic Islands from 2011 to 2019, and the Congress of Deputies. In 2021, she became president of the People's Party of the Balearic Islands, winning the 2023 Balearic regional election and becoming President of the Balearic Islands.

== Biography ==
Born in Campos on the island of Mallorca, Prohens graduated in Translation and Interpretation from Pompeu Fabra University in Barcelona. She joined the New Generations of the People's Party in 2005.

Elected to the Parliament of the Balearic Islands in 2011, she served as the PP spokesperson within it from 2015 until Biel Company took over in 2018. She was announced as the party's candidate for the Congress of Deputies for the Balearic constituency in the April 2019 Spanish general election; Maria Salom had originally been named but was then moved to be the Senate candidate.

In July 2018, new PP President Pablo Casado named Prohens the party's Secretary of Internal Communication. Three years later, she ran unopposed to be president of the People's Party of the Balearic Islands, succeeding Company. In February 2022, she was one of several regional PP leaders to withdraw confidence in Casado, leading to the 20th National Congress of the People's Party. She then endorsed Alberto Núñez Feijóo.

In the 2023 Balearic regional election, the PP rose nine seats to 26, becoming the largest party. The party reached a pact with the eight deputies from Vox, who did not join the government but had Gabriel Le Senne elected as parliamentary president, the role of speaker. An issue between the two parties was the status of Spanish and Catalan in the archipelago; the PP agreed with Vox that Spanish should be an option in education and other public services, while installing Antoni Vera, a philologist of Catalan, as Minister of Education. On 7 July, she was sworn in as President of the Balearic Islands.
