= Juan Pedro Yllanes =

Spanish judge and politician

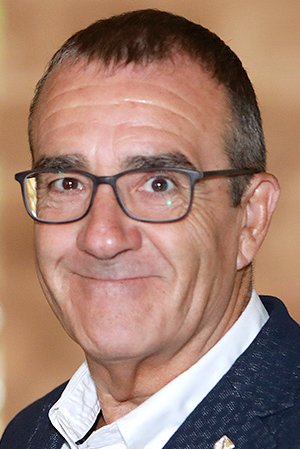

Vice President of the Balearic Islands
- In office 3 July 2019 – 30 June 2023
- Preceded by: Bel Busquets
- Succeeded by: Antoni Costa

Member of the Congress of Deputies
- In office 13 January 2016 – 5 March 2019
- Constituency: Balearic Islands

Personal details
- Born: 12 January 1960 Seville, Andalusia, Spain
- Party: Podemos
- Education: University of Seville
- Occupation: Judge

Juan Pedro Yllanes Suárez (born 12 January 1960) is a Spanish former judge and politician. He presided over cases in his native Andalusia and in the Balearic Islands. He served in the Congress of Deputies from 2016 to 2019, and as the Vice President of the Balearic Islands from 2019 to 2023. He was elected on the lists of Podemos, though he was never a member of the party.

== Legal career ==
Born in Seville, Andalusia, Yllanes graduated in Law from the University of Seville, and became a magistrate in 1991.

In January 2004, Yllanes made international headlines by sentencing Mohamed Kamal Mustafa, imam of the Fuengirola Mosque, to 15 months in prison for inciting violence against women through a book encouraging physical violence towards wives. The cleric had cited freedom of religion and precedent in Islamic law in his defence. The ruling was the first verdict of its kind in Spain.

Yllanes later moved to the courts of the Balearic Islands. In October 2009, he sentenced Javier Rodrigo de Santos, the deputy leader of the People's Party in Palma de Mallorca, to 13 years and 6 months in prison for child sexual abuse. Santos, a Catholic conservative, had abused boys during church activities.

In June 2015, Yllanes was appointed to judge Infanta Cristina of Spain – daughter of Juan Carlos I and sister of Felipe VI – her husband Iñaki Urdangarin and several others in the Nóos case. He left the case and the judicial profession in November, so he could lead Podemos's list in the Balearics in the 2015 Spanish general election.

== Political career ==
Yllanes was re-elected in 2016. In October 2017, he was the only Podemos deputy to not stand and display a message in support of Jordi Sànchez and Jordi Cuixart, two jailed organisers of the 2017 Catalan independence referendum. Earlier in the year, he was the only Podemos deputy to not sign an initiative supporting the perpetrators of the Altsasu incident in which two off-duty Civil Guards and their girlfriends were beaten in Navarre. During the dispute in Podemos between Pablo Iglesias and Íñigo Errejón, Yllanes backed the latter, but years later ruled out joining his new Más País party.

In November 2018 Yllanes was chosen as the lead candidate for the 2019 Balearic regional election. He received 1,344 of the 1,525 votes. His party fell from ten to six seats, but entered government through a pact with winners Socialist Party of the Balearic Islands (PSIB) and Més per Mallorca, resulting in him becoming vice president.

Yllanes retired and did not stand in the 2023 Balearic regional election, in which Podemos declined from six to one seat. He called for national party leader Ione Belarra to resign, and alleged that she and Pablo Echenique only remained in politics due to unspecified "interests". He called for the party to be dissolved and absorbed into Yolanda Díaz's new left-wing alliance, Sumar.
