= Més per Menorca =

- Leader: Manel Martí
- General Secretary: Albert Pons
- Founded: 21 July 2014 (as a coalition); 21 May 2017 (as a party)
- Merger of: PSM-EM; Republican Left of the Balearic Islands; The Greens of Menorca; Equo Menorca; Independents
- Ideology: Democratic socialism Green politics Left-wing nationalism Catalan nationalism Republicanism; Feminism; Regionalism
- Political position: Left-wing
- National affiliation: Sumar (since 2023)
- Regional affiliation: Veus Progressistes (2019); Més Esquerra (2019); Ara Més (since 2022); Sumar Més (2023–2026)
- European affiliation: European Free Alliance
- Congress of Deputies: 0 / 350
- Spanish Senate: 0 / 266
- European Parliament: 0 / 61
- Balearic Parliament (Menorcan seats): 2 / 13
- Council of Menorca: 3 / 13
- Mayors in Menorca: 0 / 8
- Town councilors: 15 / 125

Website
- mespermenorca.cat

Més per Menorca (English: More for Menorca, MxMe) is a Menorcan political party. It was initially a coalition formed by the Socialist Party of Menorca, the Republican Left of the Balearic Islands, The Greens of Menorca, Equo, local parties and independents around the island until 2017. Més per Menorca was created in July 2014. Until May 2017, it had been linked to the similarly-named alliance in Majorca.

== History ==
Més per Menorca gained three deputies in the Balearic elections of 2015, being the third most voted party of the island in those elections (after the PP and the Socialist Party). In the local elections held the same day, the coalition only presented a list in Ciutadella de Menorca, where it gained six town councillors and the mayorship. In the remaining municipalities of the island, Més per Menorca either participated or supported other local coalitions.

In October 2016, the Més per Menorca coalition proposed and carried a motion to adopt permanent Summer Time on the island.

In May 2017, Més per Menorca was transformed into a party, electing Nel Martí as its coordinator.

== Electoral performance ==
=== Parliament of the Balearic Islands ===
Parliament of the Balearic Islands
Election	Leading candidate	Votes	%	Seats	+/–	Government
2015	Nel Martí	6,582	1.52 (#8)	3 / 59	2 (Note: Compared to PSM–EN totals in the 2011 Balearic regional election.)	Coalition (2015–2017)
2015	Nel Martí	6,582	1.52 (#8)	3 / 59	2	Confidence and supply (2017–2019)
2019	Josep Castells	6,058	1.41 (#8)	2 / 59	1	Confidence and supply
2023	Josep Castells	6,486	1.44 (#7)	2 / 59	0	Opposition

=== Island Council of Menorca ===
Island Council of Menorca
Election	Leading candidate	Votes	%	Seats	+/–	Government
2015	Maite Salord	7,038	18.74 (#3)	3 / 13	2 (Note: Compared to PSM–EN totals in the 2011 Island Council of Menorca elections.)	Coalition
2019	Maite Salord	6,953	17.82 (#3)	3 / 13	0	Coalition
2023	Josep Juaneda	6,772	17.42 (#3)	2 / 13	1	Opposition

=== Cortes Generales ===
==== Balearic Islands ====
Congress of Deputies
Date	Votes			Seats		Size
Date	#	%	±pp	#	±	Size
2015	33,877	7.0%	–0.2	0 / 8	0	*
2016	—N/a					

Senate
Date	Seats		Size
Date	#	±	Size
2015	0 / 5	0	*
2016	0 / 5	0	**

- * Within Més
- ** Within Units Podem Més
