= Sant Francesc de s'Estany =

- Hamlet
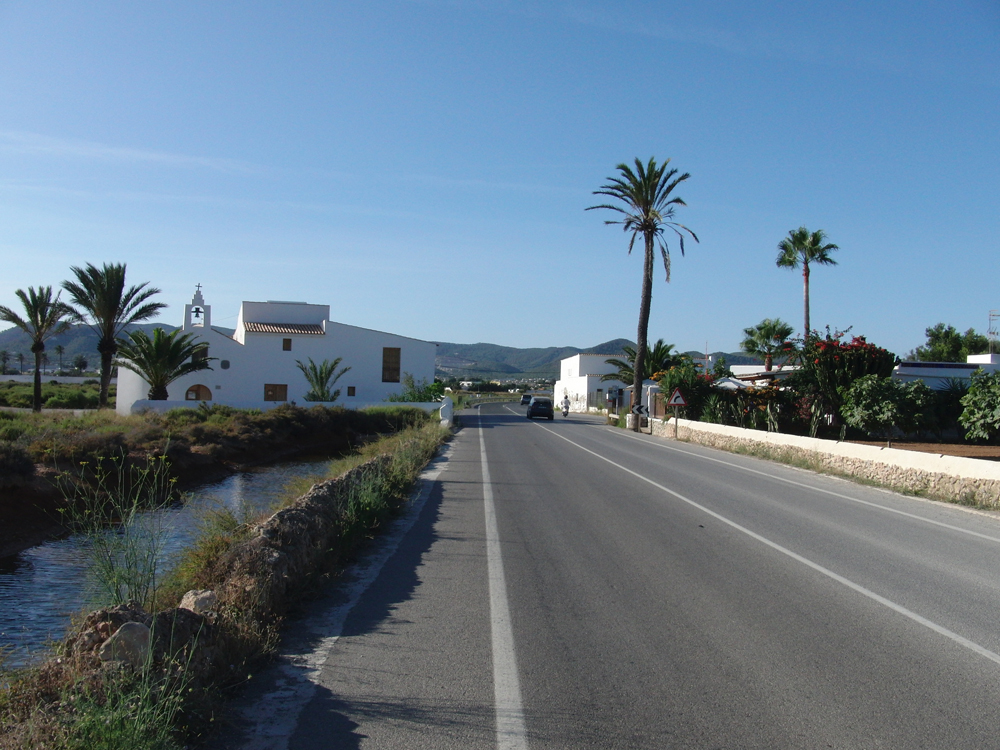
- The Church at Sant Francesc de s'Estany

- Location of the Hamlet in Ibiza
- Coordinates: 38°52′6″N 1°23′20″E
- Country: Spain
- Region: Balearic Islands
- Time zone: UTC+1 (CET)
  - Summer (DST): UTC+2 (CEST)

Sant Francesc de s'Estany is a hamlet in the south of the Spanish island of Ibiza. It is in the municipality of Sant Josep de sa Talaia and is located close to the islands main Airport and the Salines Salt Pans. It straddles the designated road EI-900 and is 4.3 miles (6.9 km) south west of Ibiza Town and 3.3 miles (5.3 km) from Ibiza Airport.

== Description ==
Sant Fracesc consists of a great many small dwellings spread across the area with the focal point being the small church. The church, almost a hermitage, located next to Ses Salines ponds, was built in 1785 by the state mainly aimed at offering religious services to the locals who worked in the ponds so that they did not have to travel home to pray. The Ses Salines as the ponds are known, are still worked today, and were first worked by the Phoenicians. Close by there are walks which border the ponds. The hamlet is also close to the beaches of Es Cavallet, ses Salines and Cap des Falcó.

== The Esglésie Sant Francesc de s'Estany ==
The little church of Saint Francis of the Lagoon stands on the road from Sant Jordi along with a small cluster of buildings which give the resemblance of a monastery. Amongst this cluster the church is apparent by its red tiled roof and bellcote. The design is simple with a very plain interior which has a low timber roof and a chancel which has a pointed arch between it and the nave, an unusual feature for Ibiza.

== The Watch Towers ==
Close to Sant Francesc de s'Estany there are two coastal defence towers. These towers were built to withstand the danger of artillery bombardment and to guard the islands most important economic asset, namely the salt workings. These two watch towers are called the Torre des Carregador (The Loading Tower), at the end of Platja d’en Bossa, and Torre de ses Portes which stands on the most southerly point of the island.

=== Torre de ses Portes ===
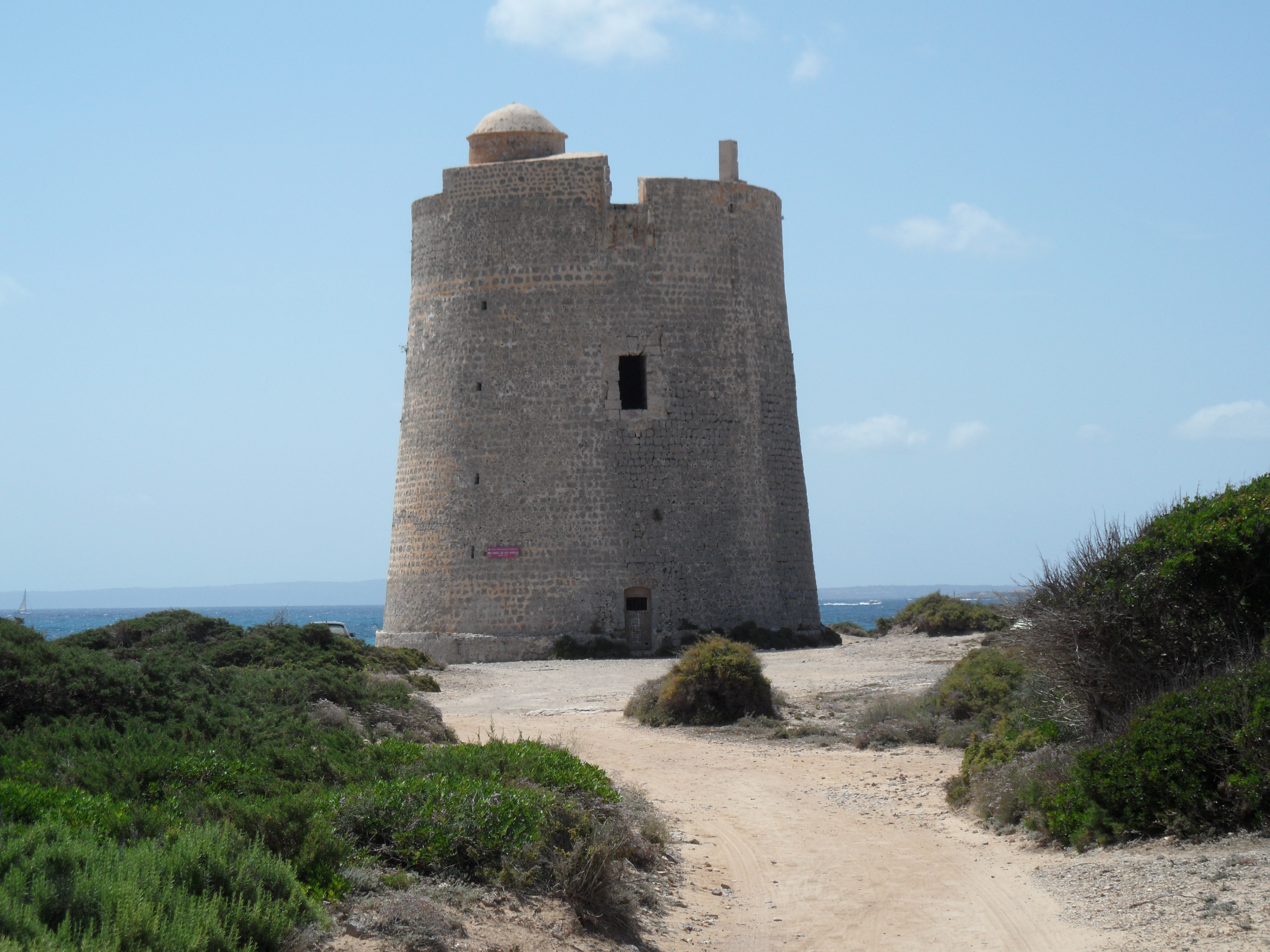
Torre de ses Portes watchtower at Ibiza's most southerly point

Torre de ses Portes was built in the late sixteenth century as an early warning system for the inhabitants of the nearby village of Sant Josep from attack by pirates. Of all the watchtowers on Ibiza this is the tallest of them. It is constructed from dressed stone which gives a smooth finish to the gently tapering walls. To the top level there is a domed turret which covers the stairs. The tower has a narrow ground floor entry which behind has a dog-legged passage for further protection. This passage leads into a spacious inner chamber with a strong vaulted roof. In one corner of this room there is a deep cistern which was designed to supply the occupants with ample water in the event of a prolonged siege. At the first floor level there is another doorway which was installed at a later date. Up on the roof of the tower, the outer walls were indented with a series of gun embrasures, although these have since been blocked off. The tower is mentioned in documents dating back to 1620 were the tower is described as being built to protect a long abandoned fishing settlement.

=== Torre des Carregador or Torre de sa Sal Rossa ===
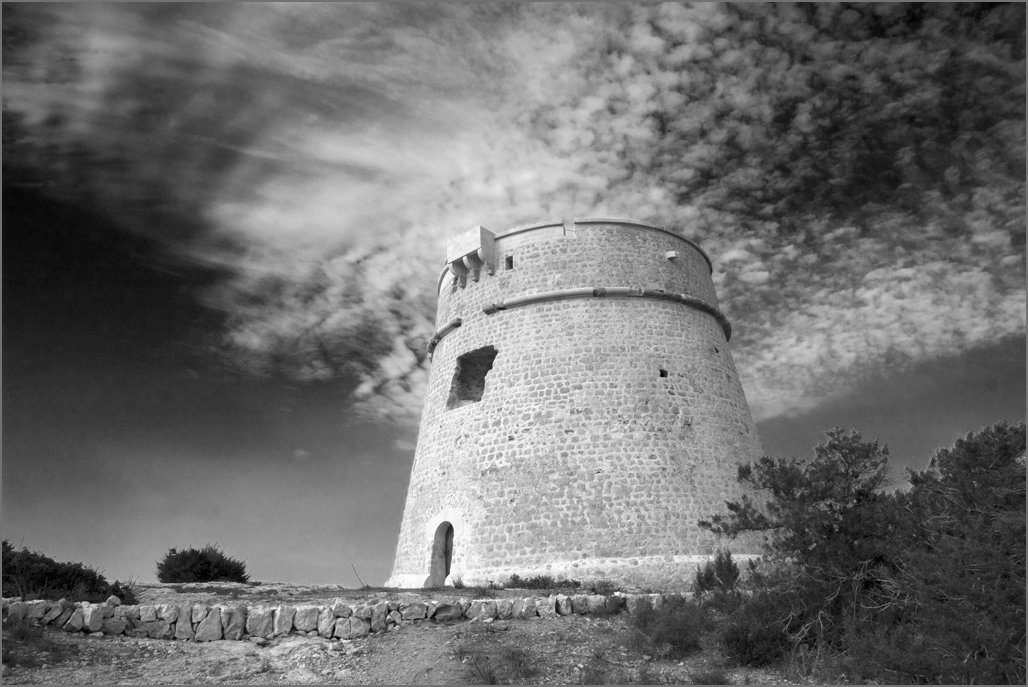
Torre des Carregador (The Loading Tower) or Torre de sa Sai Rossa (Red Salt Tower)

This watch tower is variously called by two names, Torre des Carregador, (the loading tower) or by the name Torre de sa Sal Rossa, (the red salt tower). This tower was designed by the Italian engineer Giovanni Calvi to guard the salt working at Ses Salines on or around 1582. the tower stands at the far end of Platja d’ en Bossa. The tower overlooked the landings used to load ships with the valuable salt. The building is cone shaped, and has been described as an upside-down flower pot. The tower stands 13 metres high and around its base the walls are 4 metres thick. At the upper level the walls taper to a width of 2.6 metres thick and were designed to withstand cannon fire. Just below the towers' parapet there is a protruding stringer course of stone. The original entrance was at the base, and like the Torre de ses Portes has a dog-legged passage for further protection, which was just wide enough for one man to pass through at a time. To the end of this passageway there was an inner cross wall with a firing hole for a gunner to fire shots at point blank range if necessary. The tower was refurbished in 1763 (Inscribed above a window opening) when a more secure entrance was placed in the outer wall at the first floor level. The interior of this tower is divided into two stores with vaulted roofs the floors are linked by a spiral staircase which rises right to the roof. The ground floor is where the ammunition and all the provisions were stored. The smaller first floor was the guard room which had windows and a fireplace. On the roof would be small cannon with good range over the bay. Over the doorway at roof level was a bartizan (Matacàc) which jutted out over the parapet. From here any defender could drop rocks through slots in the floor on to any attackers trying to gain access through the entrance below. Similarly, any attempt that attackers made to burn their way through the wooden door could be foiled by tipping buckets of sea water through the slots.

== Illa des Penjats ==
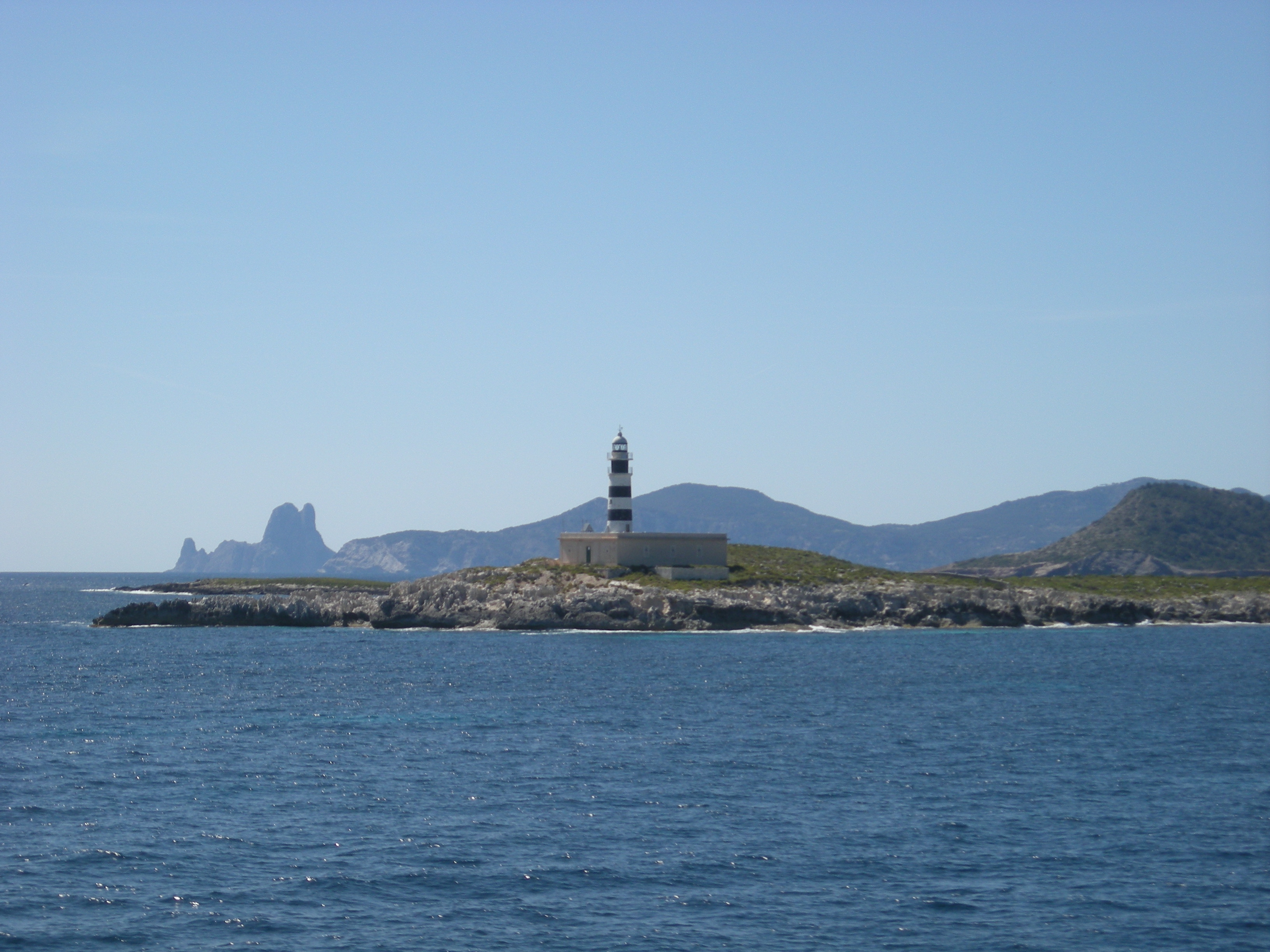
Illa des Penjats lighthouse

At this most southerly point and just a few meters of the coast is Penjat island or Illa des Penjats (Hangman's island). This small rocky island was once a place of execution. The bodies of executed pirates were left hanging here from gallows to act as a warning to other would be pirates. The island is lozenge shaped running north to south and is 150.46 metres (493.6 ft) wide and 651.72 metres (2,138.2 ft) long.

=== Lighthouse ===
At the south eastern end of the island is the Illa des Penjats lighthouse. The building is of a rectangular shape with the light tower rising from the structure. There are also two wings, which were added on the side after the lighting apparatus was changed. The building is constructed of stone blocks and is whitewashed. The lighthouse was built to guide shipping through the narrow strait of Es Freus which lies between Ibiza and Formentera.

== Posidonia Seagrass Meadows ==
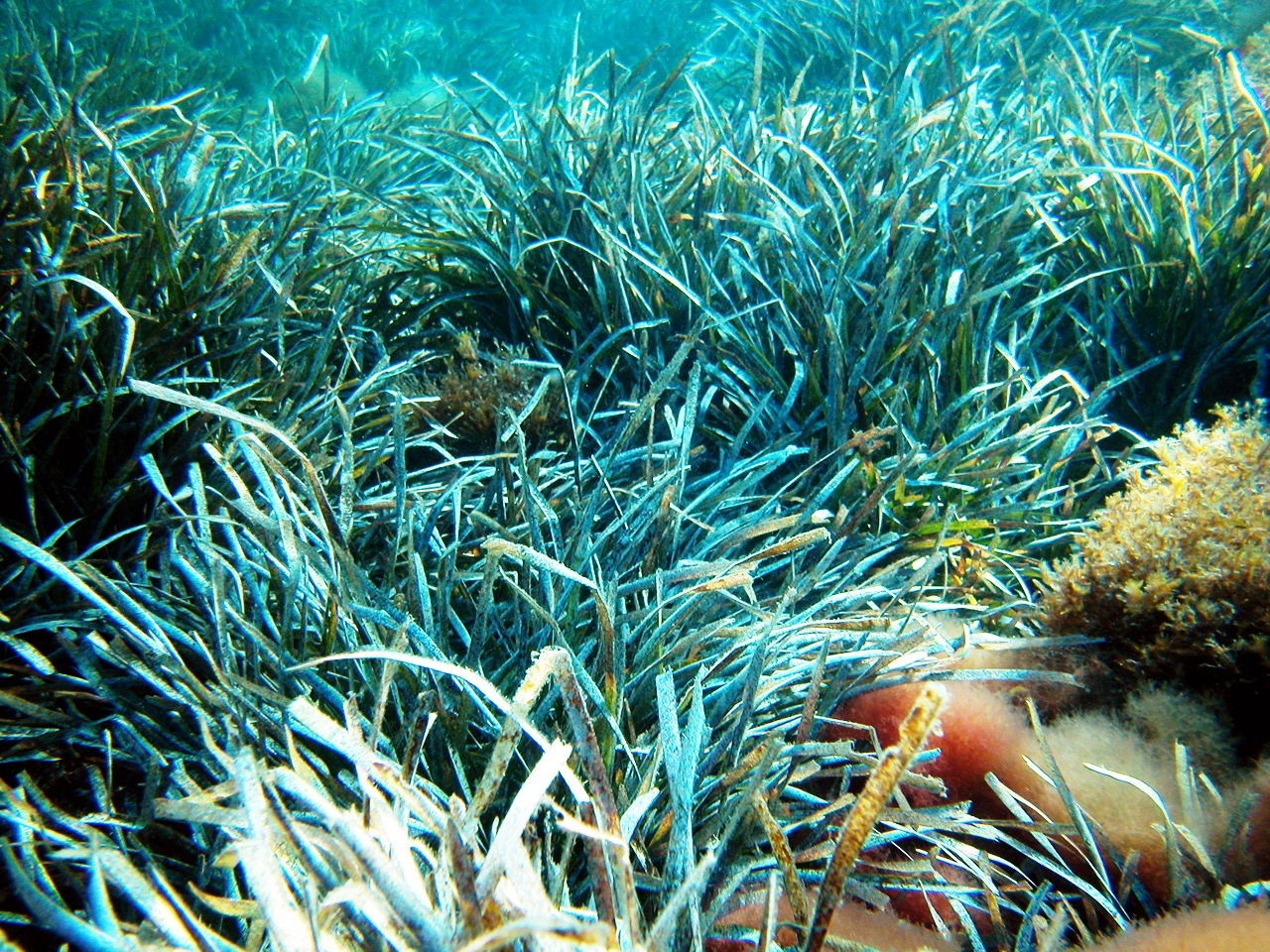
Seagrass Meadows

The sea around these islands and in the strait of Es Freus has been designated a UNESCO World Heritage Site on account of the Neptune Grass or Mediterranean tapeweed meadows (Posidonia oceanica) which can be found here. The clarity and purity of the waters surrounding the islands of Ibiza and Formentera derives largely from this vast meadow of seagrass and the fact that they have been protected and kept in a pristine condition. The meadows encourage a range of preserved biological communities. This biodiversity reflects the fact that these meadows are a larder as well as a nursery for the offspring of a vast array of species. The meadows are a vital part of the eco-system of the sea here with each hectare of meadow producing no less than twenty-one tons of oxygen each 24-hour period.

== Gallery ==
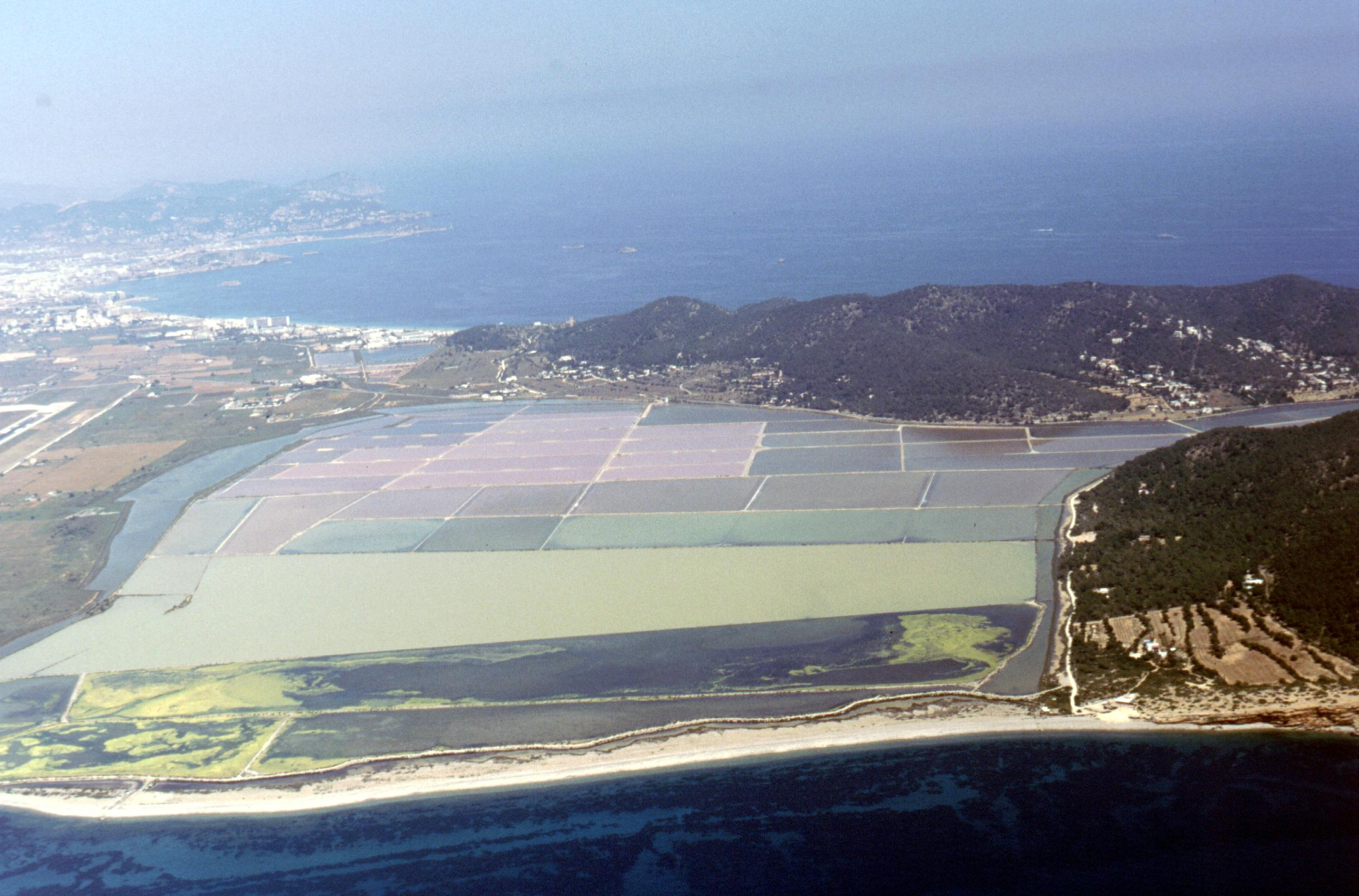
The Salinas, close to Sant Francesc de s'Estany
