= Sa Caleta =

Beach in Ibiza, Spain

- Beach
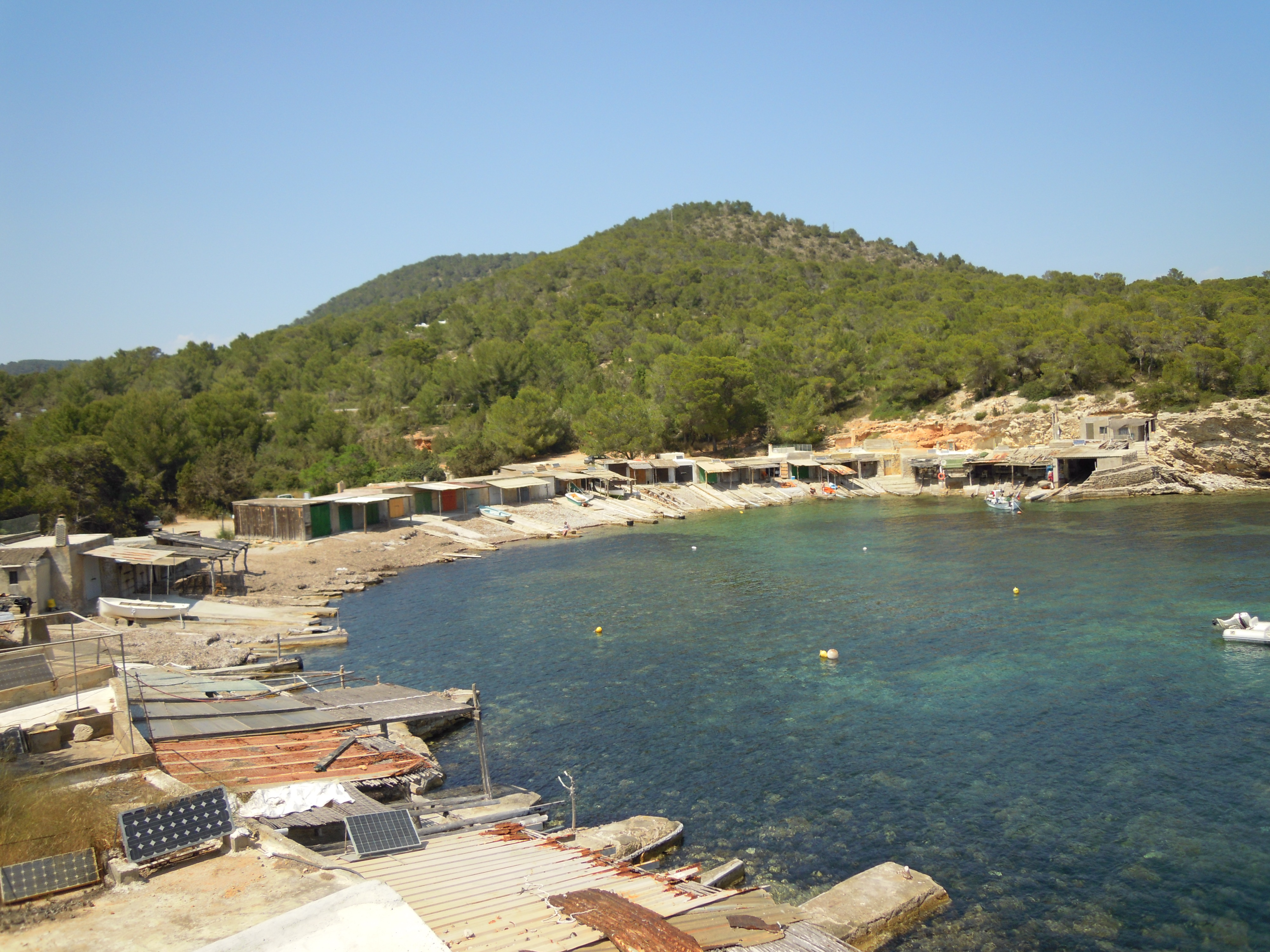
- The cove of Sa Caleta

- Location of Sa Caleta on Ibiza
- Coordinates: 38°52′8″N 1°20′5″E
- Location: Sant Josep de sa Talaia, Ibiza, Spain

Sa Caleta is a cove on the south west seaboard of the Spanish island of Ibiza. The cove is in the municipality of Sant Josep de sa Talaia and is 6.8 miles (10.9 km) west of the town of Ibiza town. The village of Sant Josep de sa Talaia is 5.7 miles (9.2 km) east of the cove.61562871399953

== Description ==
Sa Caleta is a horseshoe shaped bay lined with many rustic fisherman’s sheds. Because of its sheltered situation it is an ideal spot for sunbathing and it is often frequented by the local people of the island who like spending their sunny days off, bathing among friends and family in the coves crystal waters.

=== The Phoenicians ===
Back in ancient times the cove of Sa Caleta was the busy natural harbour of the Phoenician settlers who had built a settlement on the headland at the southern tip of the cove. The cove is still used today by a few local fishing boats and the occasional pleasure craft often moor here.

== See also ==
- Sa Caleta Phoenician Settlement
