= Cala Vadella =

Cove and beach resort on Ibiza, Spain

- Beach
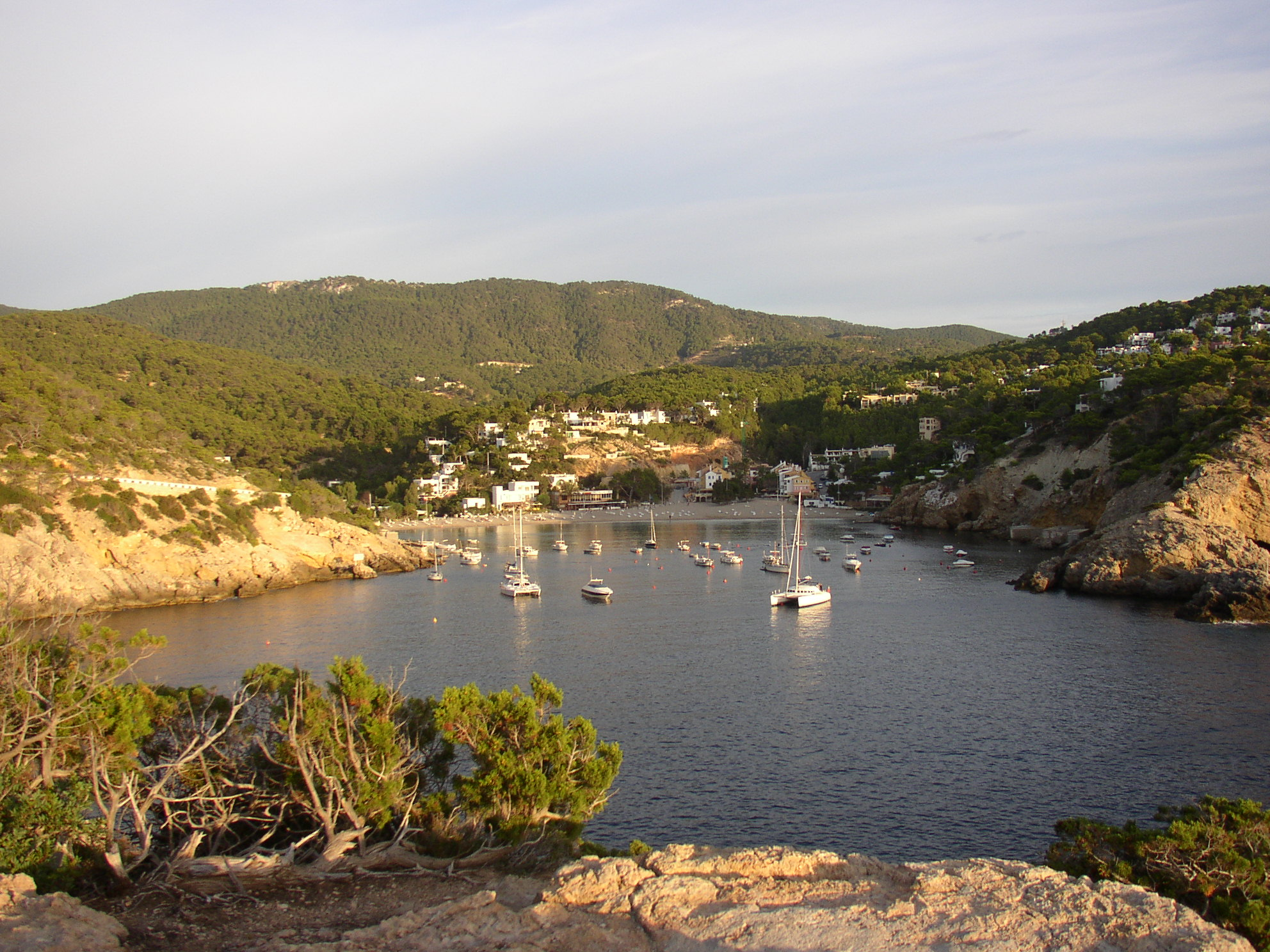
- Cala Vadella

- Location of Cala Vadella on Ibiza
- Coordinates: 38°54′47″N 1°13′26″E
- Location: Sant Josep de sa Talaia, Balearic Islands, Spain

Cala Vadella (Cala Vedella in Catalan) is a small cove and beach resort on the western seaboard of the Spanish island of Ibiza. The beach resort is in the municipality of Sant Josep de sa Talaia and is 14.5 miles (23.3 km) west of the town of Ibiza town. The nearest village of Sant Josep de sa Talaia is 5.3 miles (8.5 km) east of the beach resort. In 2012 Cala Vadella is one of the 12 blue flag beaches on Ibiza.

== The Cove ==
The main beach at Cala Vedella is at the eastern end of a small hooked cove that sits amongst pine wood topped cliffs. The north side of the cove juts out to a small headland called Es’ Torraci which itself has a small inlet on it north side with a small satellite beach called Sa Torrasa. In the inlet there are several fishmans slipways which give easy access to the sea. On the southern side of the inlet there is another small beach which was once home to an illegal bar come nightclub, long since closed but the concrete remnants of the dance floor still remain near the water and makes an ideal spot for sunbathing. The main beach is a good size and depth, and is made of fine white sand and ideal for families with small children. Behind the beach the small resort is made up of villas and low rise hotels and apartments. There is also a large range of services which include a selection of bars, restaurants and shops The water is very shallow close to the beach and its crystal clear water slope very gently. The rocky sides to the cove can be a good environment for snorkelling. However, the swimming and snorkelling experience is marred, in some years, by infestations of stinging jellyfish.

=== Facilities ===
During the summer season the main beach is patrolled by lifeguards. There are Loungers, parasols and Pedalos which can be hired. Just off the beach many types of water sports can be enjoyed, such as snorkelling, water skiing and there is a diving school. The main beach has good access for the disabled with gentle slopes down to the sand. There are showers available on beach. Behind the beach there is parking for 250 cars including a small amount of allocated parking bays for disabled drivers displaying a European blue badge. There are further parking areas to the north and south ends of the inlet.

== Visiting ==
The best route to reach Cala Vedella is to take the EI-700 out of Sant Josep de sa Talaia towards Sant Antoni. In a kilometre there is a brown tourist sign for Cala Vedella to the left and then there are further signs which direct you to the resort. During the summer months there is a regular bus service which starts in Ibiza town via Sant Josep de sa Talaia. Or alternatively from Sant Antoni.

== Gallery ==
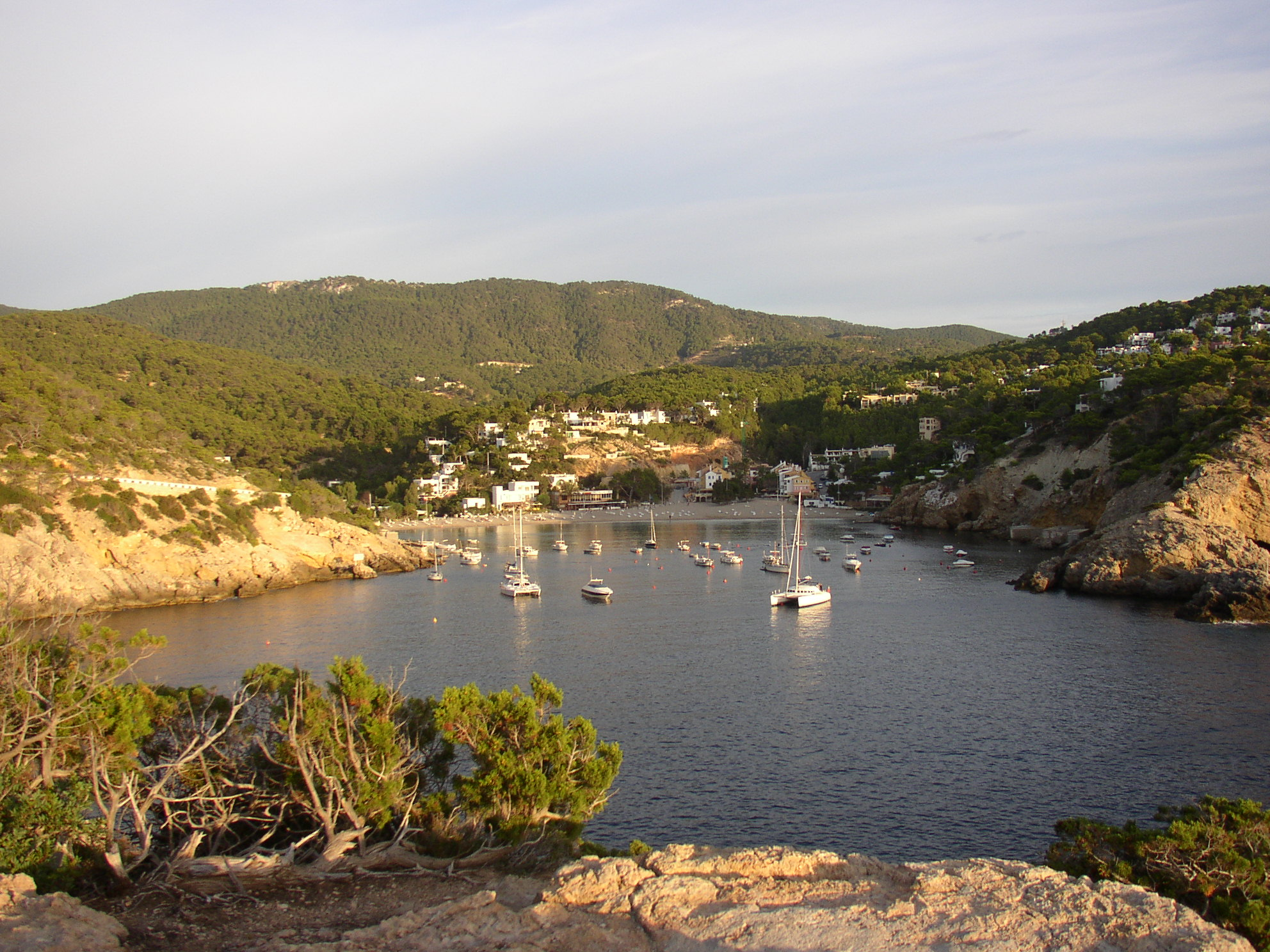
Looking eastward into the cove from Es Torraci

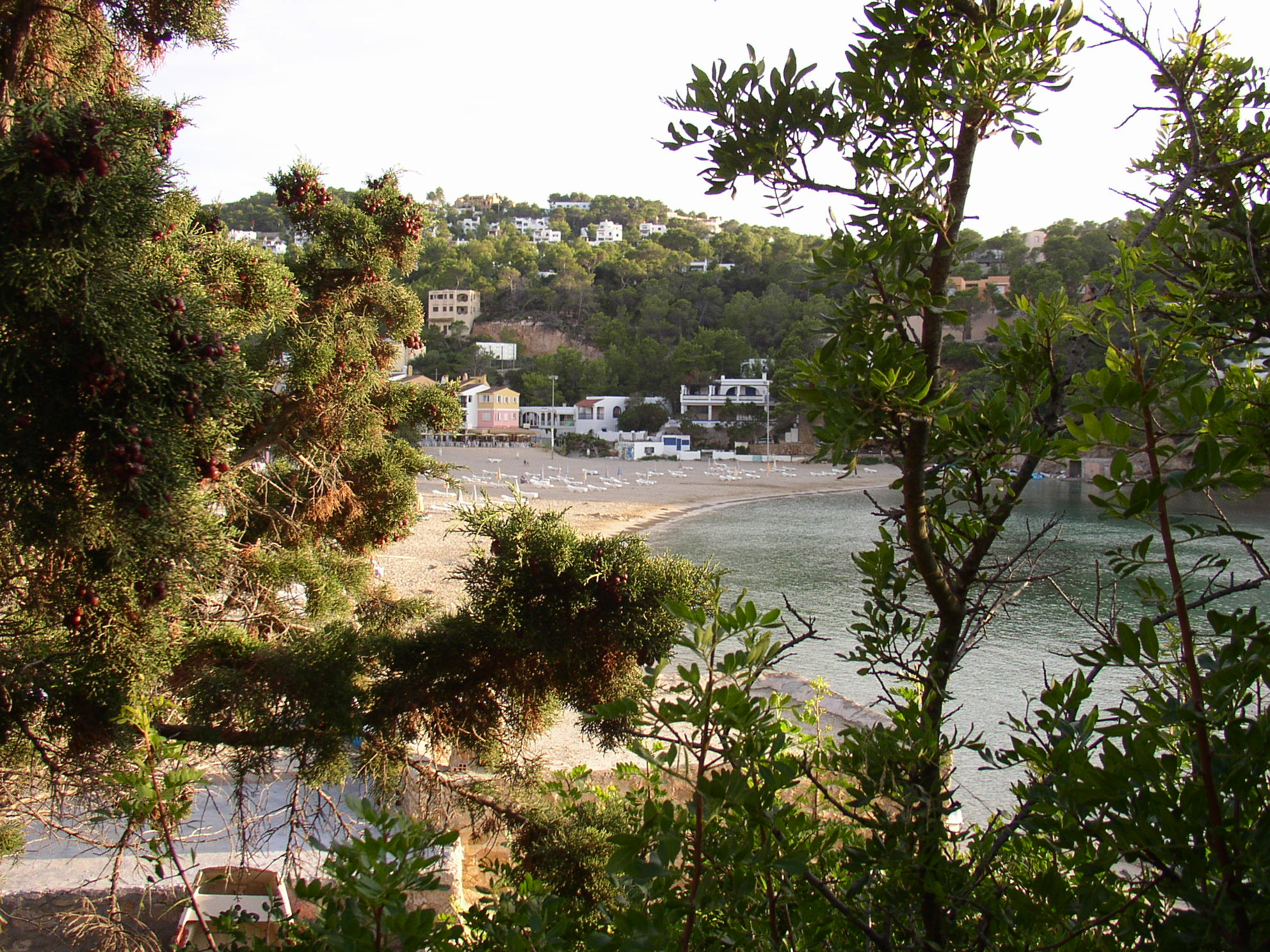
Cala Vadella

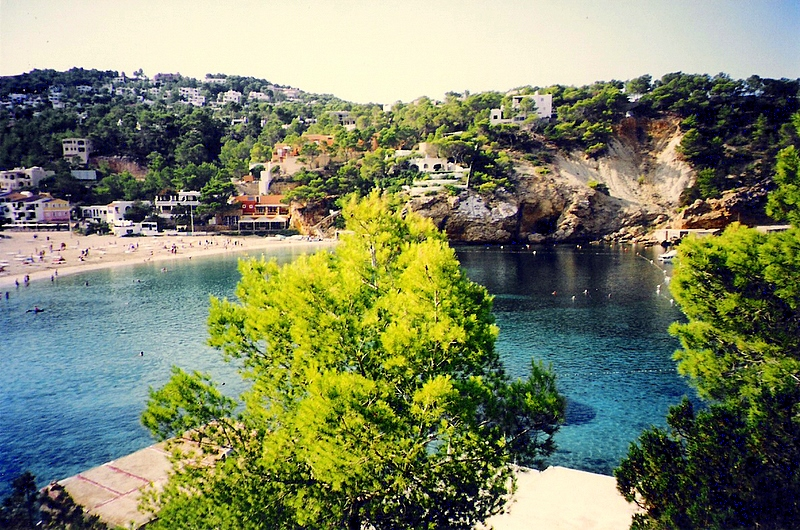
Southern heights above the cove
