= Platja Port d'es Torrent =

Beach in Ibiza, Spain

Port d'es Torrent
- Beach
- Location of Port d'es Torrent on Ibiza
- Coordinates: 38°58′0.24″N 1°16′6″E
- Location: Sant Josep de sa Talaia, Balearic Islands, Spain

Port d'es Torrent is in a small cove within the bay of Sant Antoni Bay. The beach is on the northern seaboard of the Spanish island of Ibiza. Although it is but a short distance from Sant Antoni, it is in the municipality of Sant Josep de sa Talaia. Platja d'es Torrent is 12.6 miles (20.3 km) north west of Ibiza town, and 3.6 miles (5.8 km) west around the bay from Sant Antoni. In 2012 Port d'es Torrent is one of the 12 blue flag beaches on the island.

== Description ==
This small bay gets its name from the seasonal stream which originates on the slopes of Sa Talaiassa, the highest point on the islands, and runs down to its terminus in this small cove. Platja Port d’es Torrent is at the western end of the Bay of Sant Antoni. In the summer season, the beach is patrolled by lifeguards. The beach is made up of fine gold sand and slopes very gently into the shallow water at the head of this cove. The water at the mouth of the inlet is deeper and gives a good opportunity for diving and snorkelling.

The area around the Port d'es Torrent has a small amount of developed land at the back of the beach, which consists of villas and low-rise hotels and apartments. There are several restaurants and bars in the vicinity, including one on the beach.
