= Balearic Sea =

Part of the Mediterranean Sea near the Balearic Islands

- Interactive map of Balearic Sea
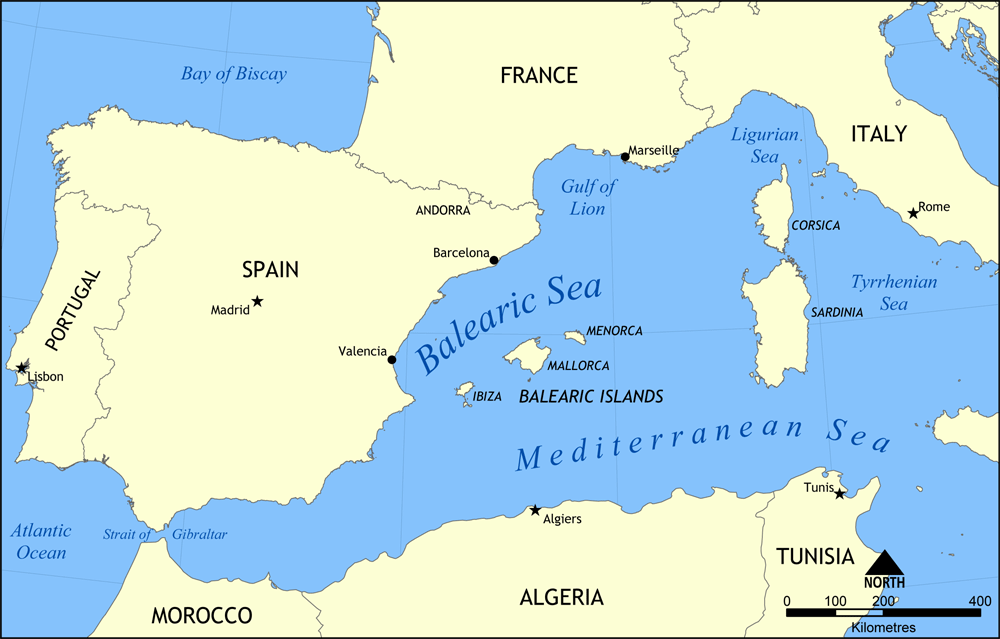
- Location of the Balearic Sea
- Location: Mediterranean Sea
- Coordinates: 40°N 1.5°E

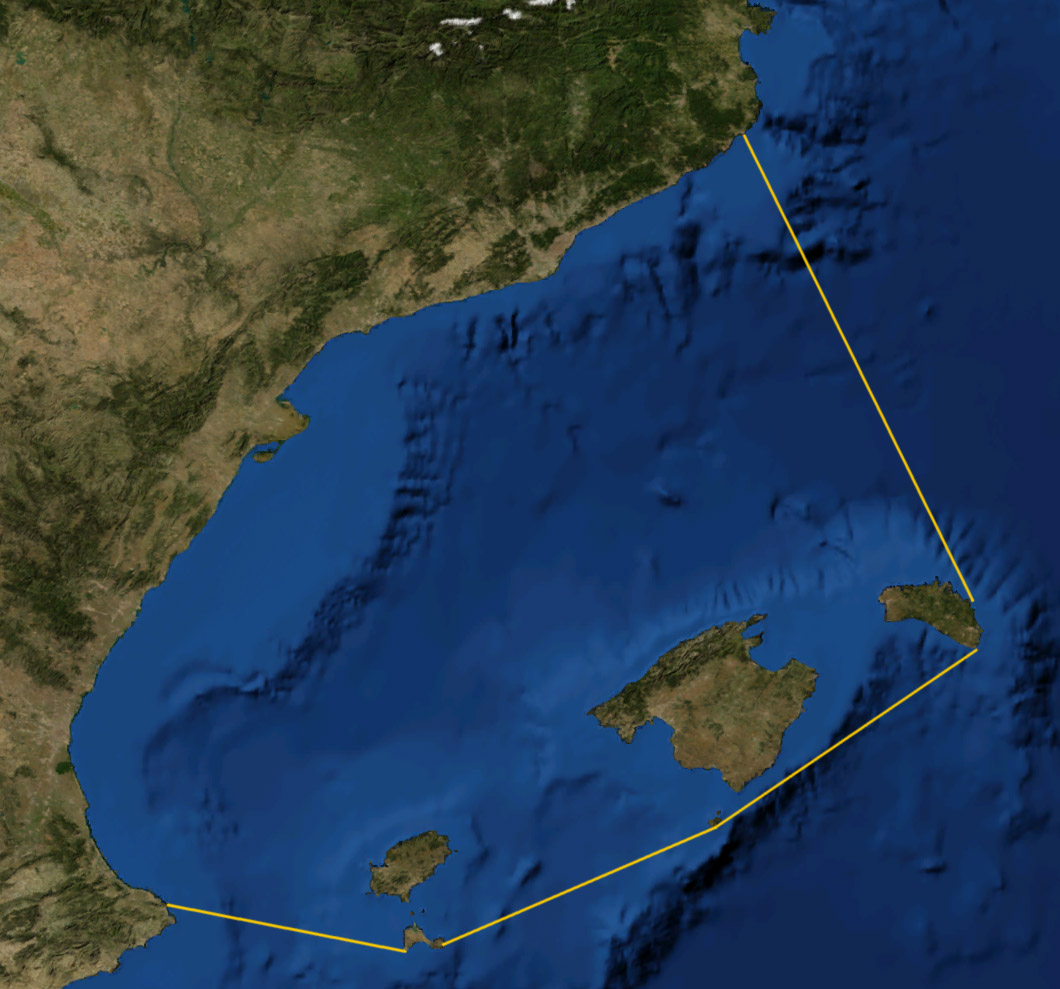
Limits of the Balearic Sea

The Balearic Sea (endotoponym: Mar Balear in Catalan and Spanish) also known as Iberian Sea, is a body of water in the Mediterranean Sea between the Balearic Islands and mainland Spain. The Ebro River flows into this small sea.

== Islands and archipelagoes ==
The Balearic islands are divided into two groups: Gimnesias in the northeast, and Pitiusas in the southwest.

=== Gimnesias ===
- Menorca
- Mallorca
- Cabrera

=== Pitiusas ===
- Ibiza
- Formentera

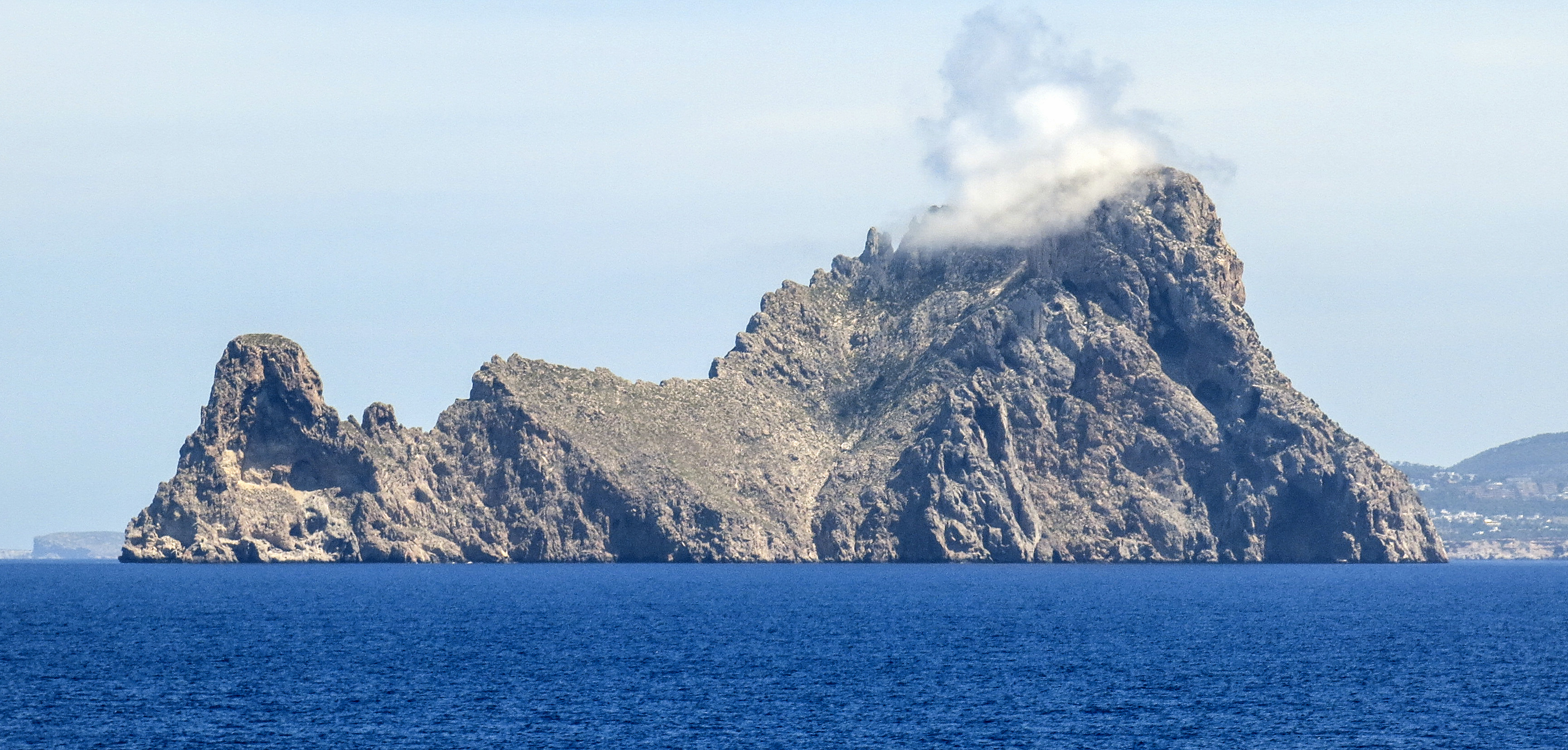
Es Vedrà (Sant Josep de sa Talaia, Ibiza)

== Extent ==
The International Hydrographic Organization defines the limits of the Balearic Sea as follows:

Between the Islas Baleares and the coast of Spain, bounded:

On the Southwest. A line from Cape Sant Antoni, Valencian Community (38°50′N 0°12′E) to Cape Berberia, the Southwest extreme of Formentera (Balearic Islands).

On the Southeast. The South Coast of Formentera, thence a line from Punta Rotja, its Eastern extreme, to the Southern extreme of Cabrera, Balearic Islands (39°07′N 2°54′E) and to Illa de l'Aire, off the Southern extreme of Menorca.

On the Northeast. The East coast of Menorca up to Cap Favaritx (40°00′N 4°14′E) thence a line to Cape Sant Sebastià Catalonia (41°54′N 3°10′E).

== See also ==
- Gulf of Cádiz
- Gulf of Lion
