= Platja Es Pinet =

Beach in Ibiza, Spain

- Beach
- Location of Platja Es Pinet on Ibiza
- Coordinates: 38°58′18″N 1°17′9″E
- Location: Sant Josep de sa Talaia, Balearic Islands, Spain

Platja Es Pinet is in a small cove within the bay of Sant Antoni Bay. The beach is on the northern seaboard of the Spanish island of Ibiza. Although it is but a short distance from Sant Antoni, It is in the municipality of Sant Josep de sa Talaia. Platja Es Pinet is 11.9 miles (19.2 km) north west of Ibiza town, and 2.9 miles (4.7 km) west around the bay from Sant Antoni.In 2012 Platja Es Pinet is one of the 12 blue flag beaches on the island. The beach sand is soft and the water is safe, clean, and shallow.
