= Cala d'Hort =

Beach on Ibiza, Spain

Cala d’Hort
- Beach
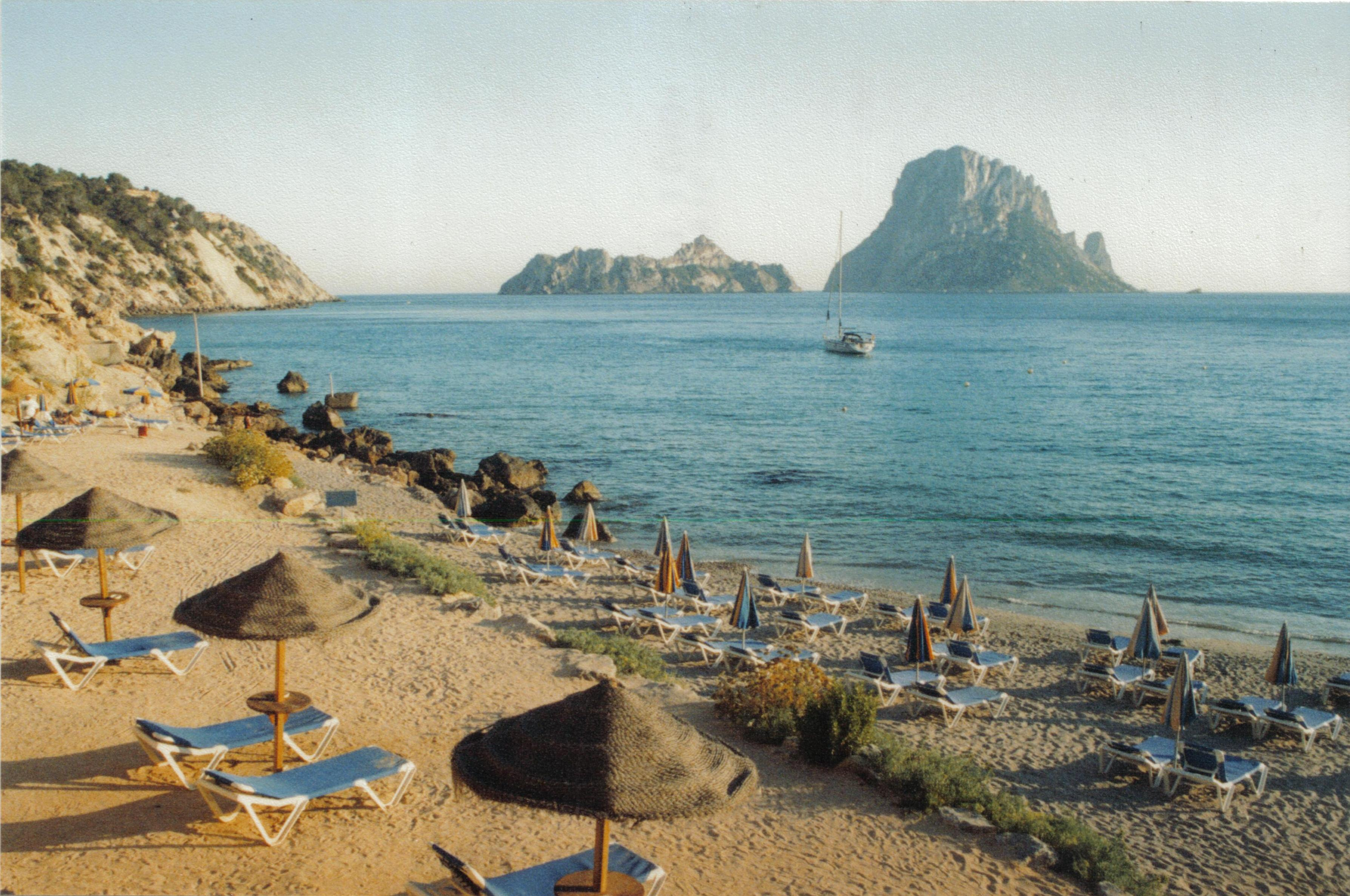
- Cala d’Hort with the rock island of Es Vedrà

- Location of Cala d’Hort on Ibiza
- Coordinates: 38°53′25″N 1°13′27″E
- Location: Sant Josep de sa Talaia, Ibiza, Spain

Cala d'Hort (Balearic Catalan: [ˈkalə ˈðɔɾt]) is a beach on the western seaboard of the Spanish island of Ibiza. The beach is in the municipality of Sant Josep de sa Talaia and is 13.3 miles (21.4 km) west of the town of Ibiza town. The village of Sant Josep de sa Talaia is 7.0 miles (11.3 km) east of the beach. In 2012 Cala d'Hort is one of the 12 blue flag beaches on the island.

== Recent history ==
=== The Battle of Cala d'Hort ===
The so-called battle of Cala d'Hort was a demonstration by the island's environmentalists against developers who saw the sparsely populated slopes of the Serra de Ses Roques Altes as the perfect place to expand the island's tourist industry. A 420-room hotel and 18-hole golf course were planned, along with a desalination plant to provide the drinking water for such a large development. The island's green movement, known as GEN-GOB, began a campaign to stop the development in 1992. After 6 years of various objections and legal wrangles, the development was approved to proceed with construction in 1998. The GEN-GOB decided that greater measures were needed and they took their arguments against the development to the island's government through an organised protest march. The protest was organised in January 1999, and eleven thousand protesters showed up to march through the streets of Ibiza town. The local politicians quickly realised that this number made up 14% of the islands population, and the wave of opposition helped to sweep the ruling PP party from power. In August 1999 the local government put a stop to all development plans. The Cala d'Hort National Park was created in February 2002.

== Gallery ==
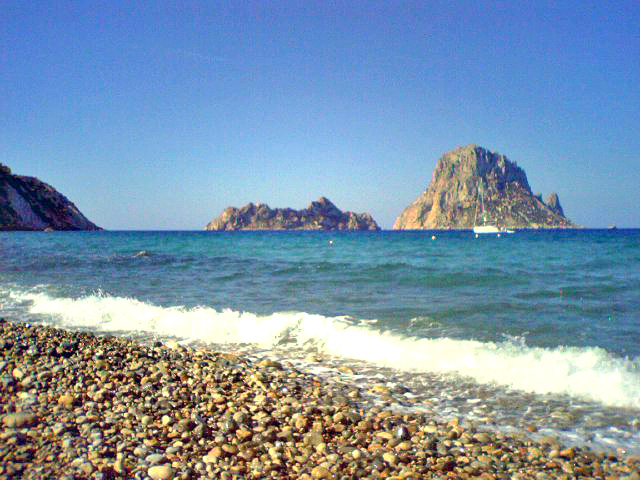

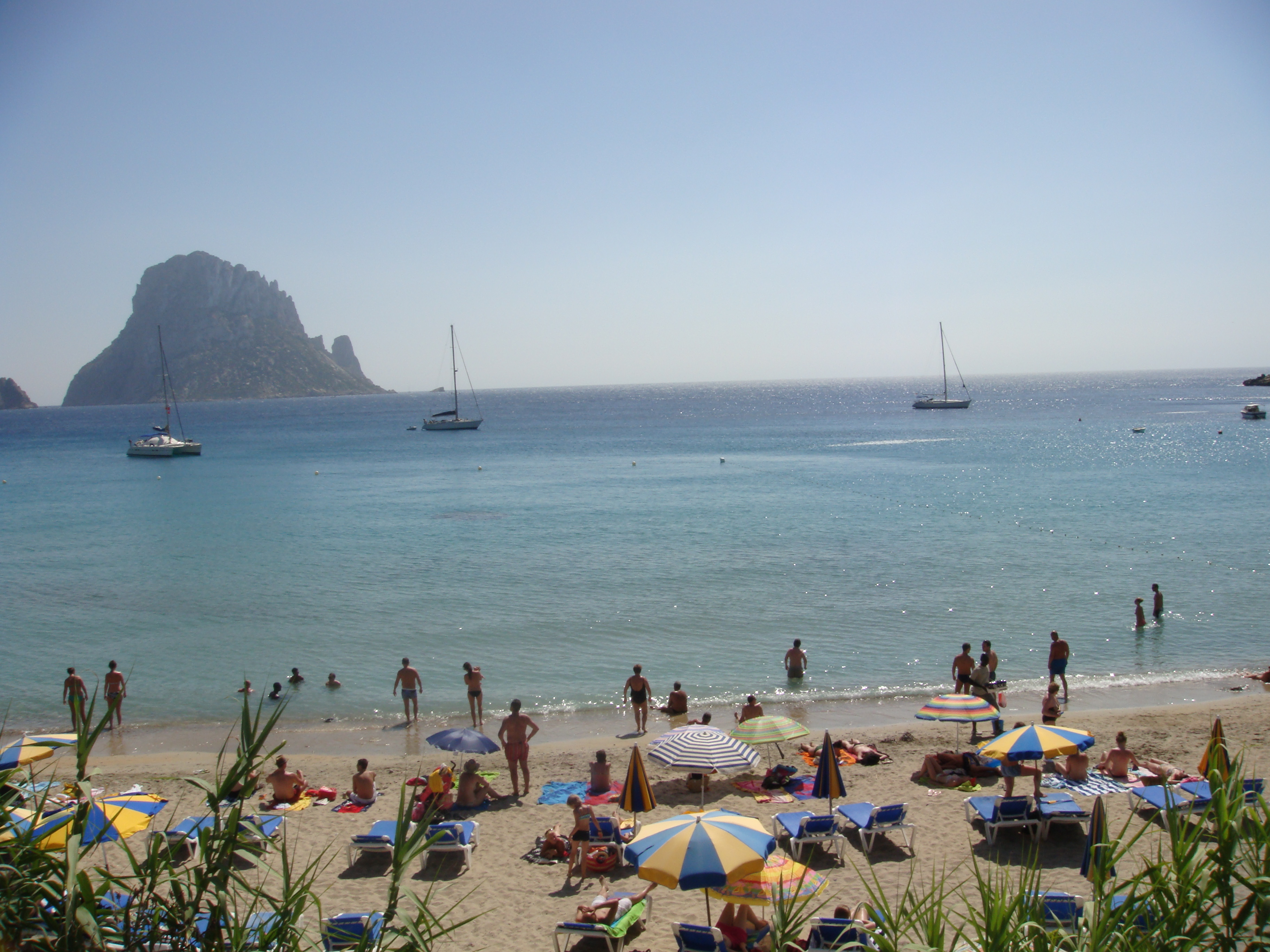

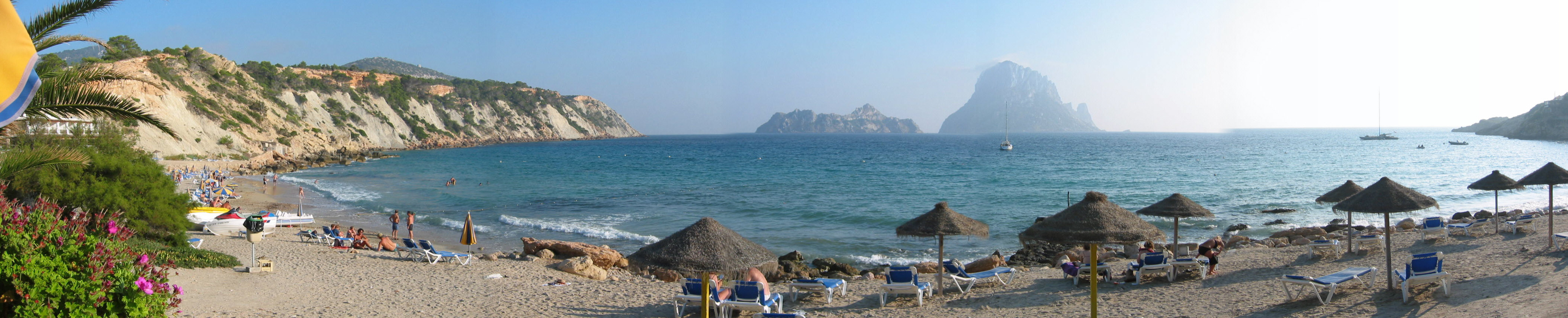
