= Es Vedrà =

Island off the south western seaboard of the Spanish island of Ibiza

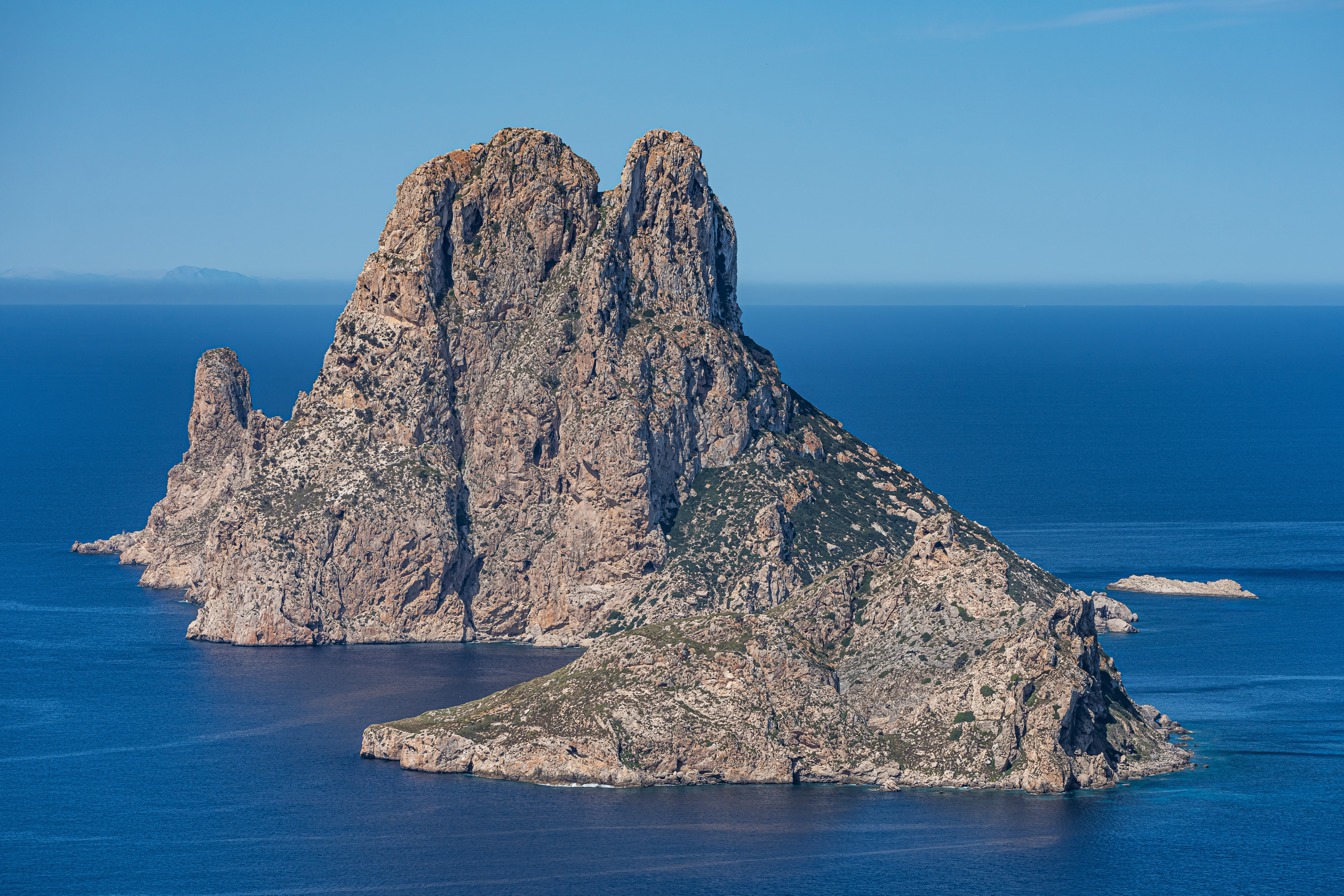
- The island of Es Vedrà

- Location within Spain

Geography
- Location: Balearic Sea
- Coordinates: 38°52′01″N 1°11′58″E
- Archipelago: Balearic Archipelago

Administration
- Spain
- Autonomous Community: Balearic Islands
- Province: Ibiza
- Municipality: Sant Josep

Demographics
- Population: 0

Es Vedrà (Balearic Catalan: [əz vəˈðɾa]) is a small rocky island off the south western seaboard of the Spanish island of Ibiza. The island, which is 413 metres tall, is part of the Cala d'Hort nature reserve and lies 1.5423 miles (2.4821 km) off the coast at Cala d'Hort, which is in the municipality of Sant Josep de sa Talaia. The island is uninhabited.

== Geology ==
Es Vedrà consists predominantly of mesozoic limestone, and contrary to the esoteric urban myth of being a special magnetic place, has no (magnetic) metal accumulations. The island we see today is as a result of a geological tumble. 155 million years ago, continuous seismic movements in the Earth's crust caused great shifts in the Betica Mountain Range. Eventually this caused the splitting of the range resulting in the formation of the Balearic Islands. Continued movement of the ridge which formed the islands caused portions to sheer and split away from the islands. Es Vedrà, along with the satellite island of Illa Vedranell and the Illa Tagomago, are examples of this action.

== Habitation ==
The island has no human inhabitants, although in 1855 a Carmelite friar by the name of Francis Palau y Quer once lived here for a short time following his exile from Catalonia. The only inhabitants were a sub-species of wild goat but these were slaughtered by the local government in 2016 to protect the fauna of the island. There is also a sub-species of the Ibizan wall lizard on the island. It is also home to a colony of the endangered bird of prey called Eleonora's falcon.

== Legends and mythology ==
The island is said to be home to sirens and sea-nymphs, who tried to lure Odysseus from his ship in Homer's Odyssey. It is also thought of as the holy island of the Tanit the Phoenician lunar goddess, worshiped as the patron goddess and of fertility, who became Ibiza's patroness. Legend has it that specific sacrifices were made to Tanit during full moons on the shore of the island.

=== The Giant of Es Vedrà ===
Es Vedrà is also the setting for one of Ibiza's popular fables (Rondalles). Es Gegant des Vedrà (The Giant of Es Vedrà) is the tale about two brothers who, to cure their father of an incurable illness, had to go to Es Vedrà island to gather rock samphire and face the huge giant who lived on the island, huddled in one of the island's many caves. The two brothers' ingenuity, along with the help of sea urchins, managed to debilitate the giant, and thus collect the samphire for the cure.

=== Francis Palau y Quer ===
The Carmelite friar Francis Palau y Quer arrived on Ibiza following his exile from Barcelona in 1855. Needing solitude, he used to retire to Es Vedrà by rowing a boat, to pray there and seek God's will. Legend says that he spent a week meditating surviving on nothing but rainwater he collected from drips from the roof of a cave he used for shelter. Within hours, he began to witness a series of powerful visions. He later described them in a book, called My Relations With the church

The day passed and the night came. the sea was at peace, the air very soft, the sky somewhat overcast by dense black clouds... the moonlight was very dim. And i saw in front of me, coming from afar, a shadow whose distance countenance I could not perceive; and it was coming closer to me. As it drew nearer I could make out what it was. The figure came alone, and was as white as the moonlight itself; and the figure represented a girl of 16 years, all white, all lovely, all amiable, At the moment she arrived the heavens opened and in the radiant sunlight I saw who it was that had before me ... I was aggrieved that I couldn't see her with the clarity I wished: a veil covered her face, but was transparent... she was silent and so was I, but a dumb voice was speaking and possessed words.

— My Relations with the Church

He started to write Mis Relaciones Con la Iglesia (My Relations With the Church), a sort of autobiographical journal, partly written in the idyllic solitude of Es Vedrà, transmitting his experience of the Church conceived as God and neighbors. Fr. Francisco Palau, O.C.D. was beatified in Rome by Pope John Paul II on April 24, 1988. The Catholic Church commemorates him liturgically on March 20, while the Discalced Carmelites celebrate his feast on November 7.

== Gallery ==
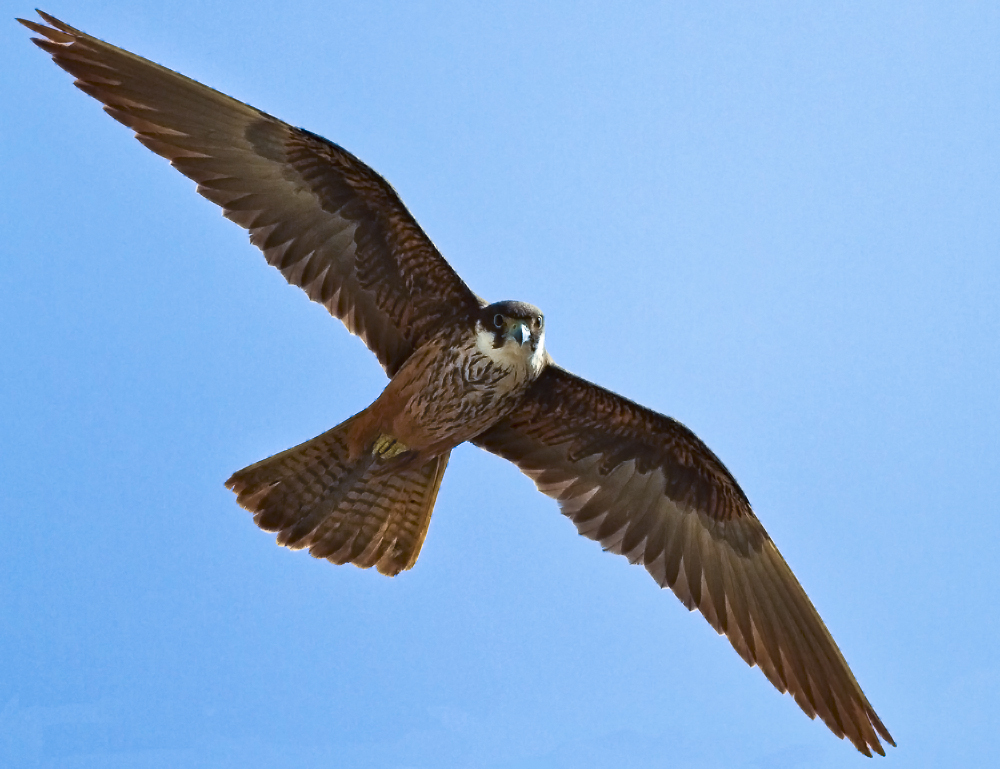
An Eleanor's falcon, a native bird of prey

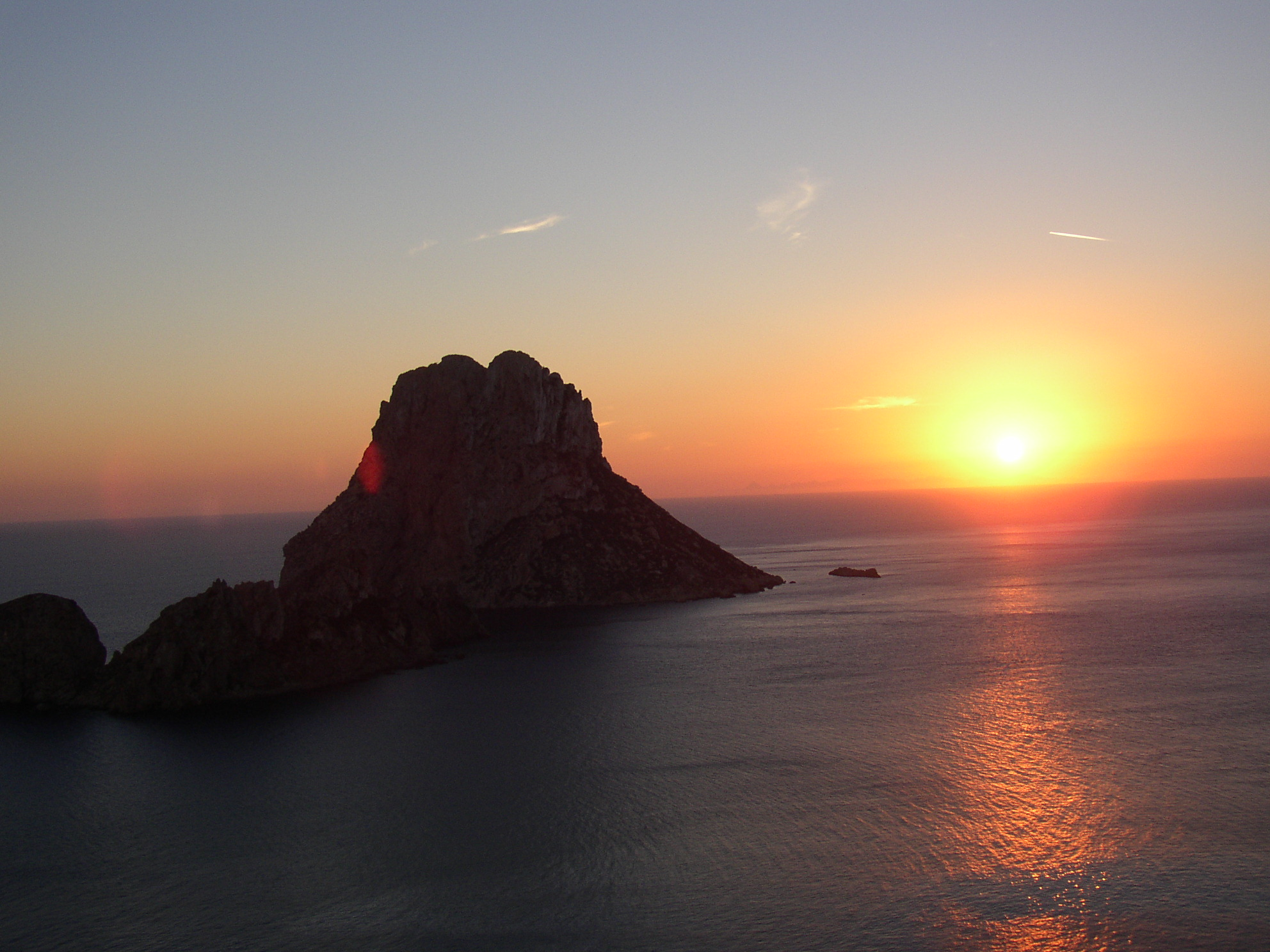
Sunset over Es Vedrà

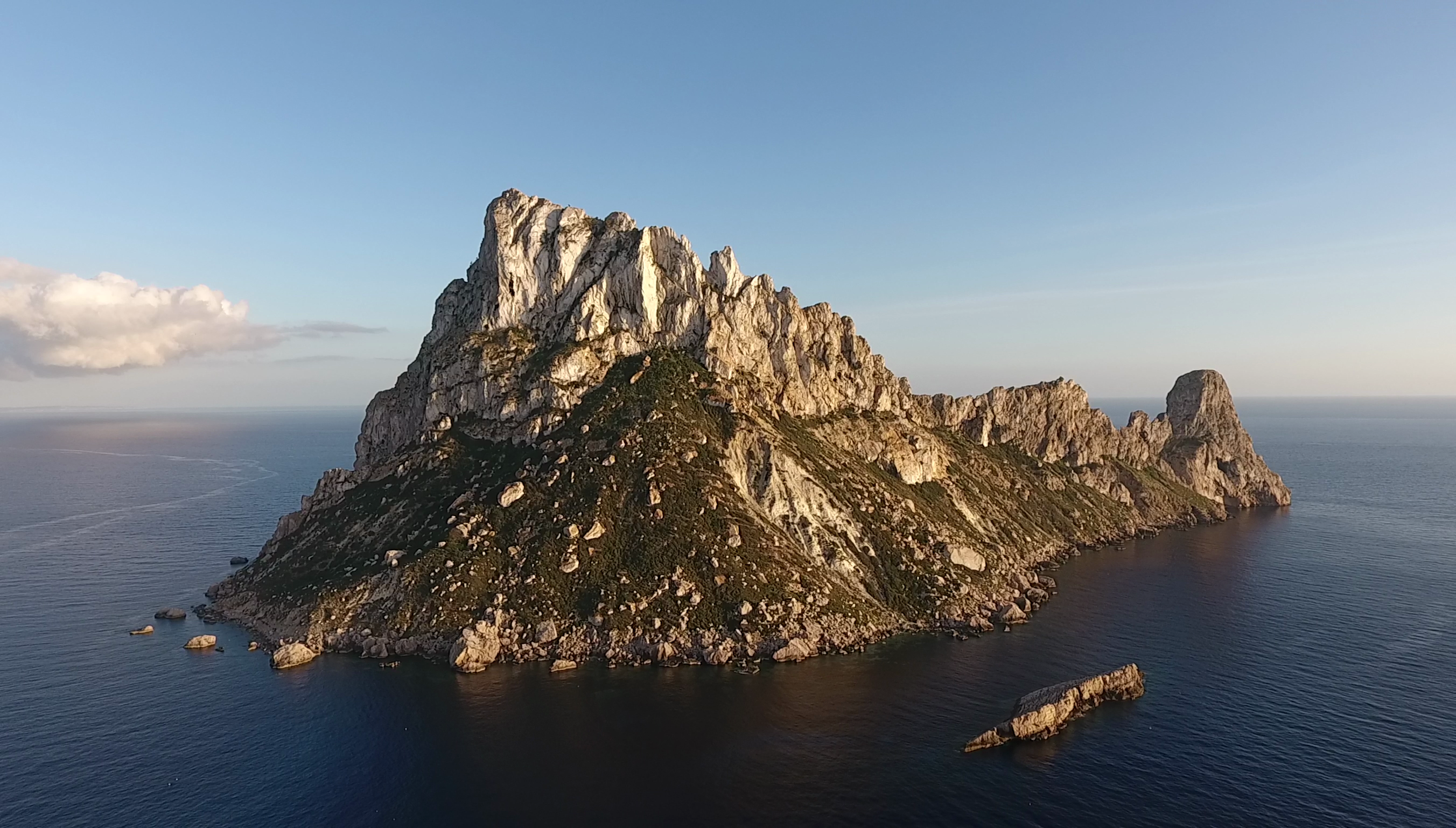
Es Vedrà viewed from a drone
