= Sa Caleta Coastal Battery =

- Balearic Islands, Ibiza
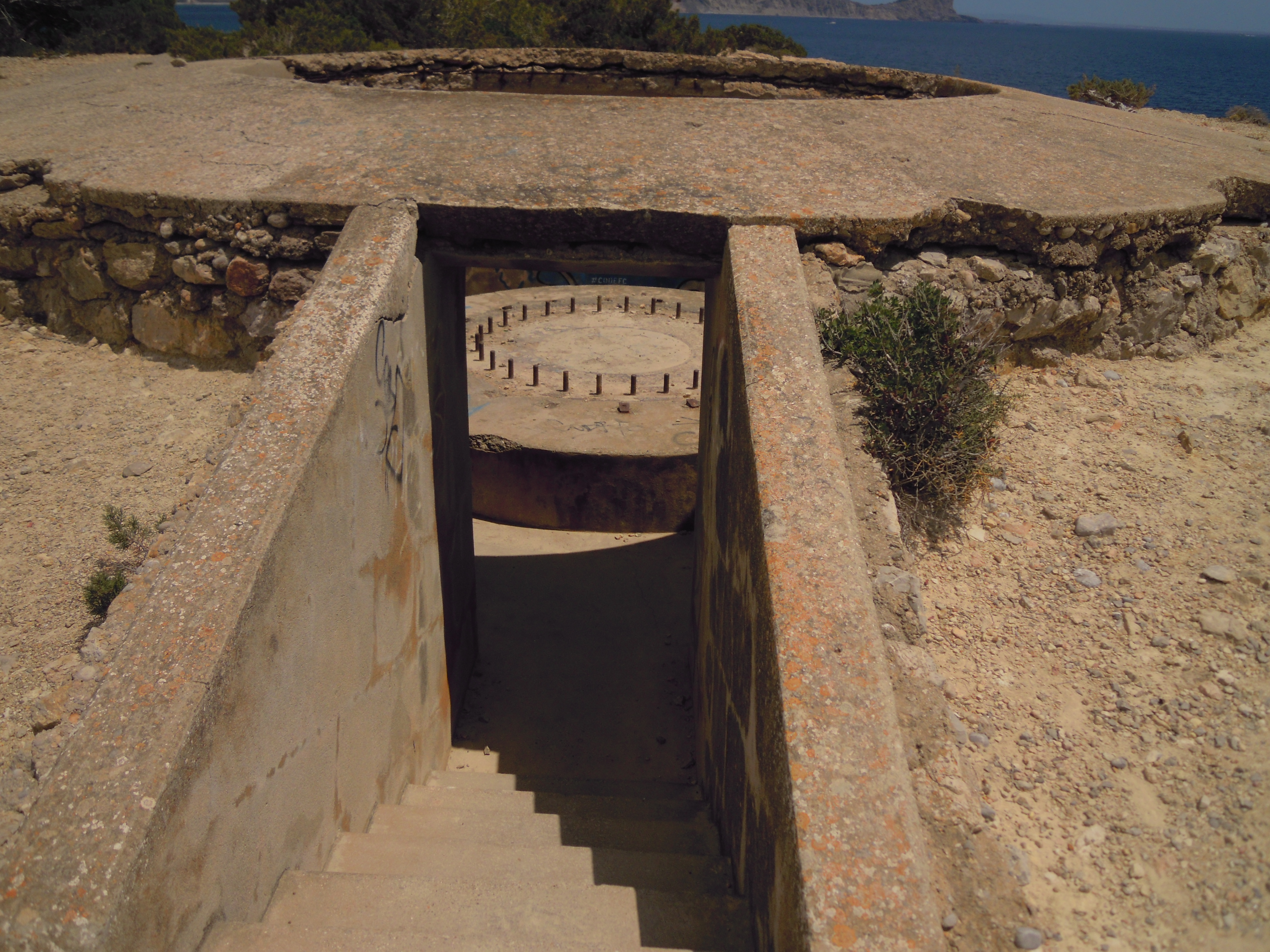
- Sa Caleta Coastal Battery

Site information
- Type: Artillery Casemate

Location
- Coordinates: 38°52′1.93″N 1°20′2.99″E

Site history
- Built: 1936 to 1937
- Materials: Reinforced Concrete

The Sa Caleta Coastal Battery is a coastal defence consisting of a set three open gun emplacements built between 1936 and 1937, by the Nationalist during the Spanish Civil war to protect the approaches to Ibiza Airport on the Spanish Island of Ibiza, Spain.

== Location ==
The battery is to be found on a small rocky headland west of the small cove known as Sa Caleta, which is on the south west seaboard of the island of Ibiza.

The headland Battery was chosen for its commanding views across the bay to the approaches to Ibiza Airport which during the Spanish Civil war was a temporary military airport known as Es Codolá.

== Description ==
This coastal battery consists of three concrete gun emplacements, a further concrete structure which may once have housed a range finder or search lights. The gun emplacements have an external diameter of 5 meters and the concrete walls are 1 meter thick. Two of the emplacements are connected by a tunnel. The third emplacement is accessible by its own stairway. This structure also has its own small stone building attached.

The second and third gun emplacements still have a series of 28 gun base plate bolts of about 30 mm in place. Downhill from the site and away from the cliffs there are several stone bunk houses and barracks which are mostly burnt out inside and in a bad state of repair. The big U-shaped barracks have arched ceilings. Close to these structures, on a small hill, stands what appears to be a rain water tank. From the back of the big barracks runs a trench changing into a tunnel, which opens to the beach below, but is still about 6 meters above ground at its exit. On both sides of the site are remains of small machine gun positions. One of them has been badly damaged by fire at some point.

=== Gallery ===
Sa Caleta Coastal Battery

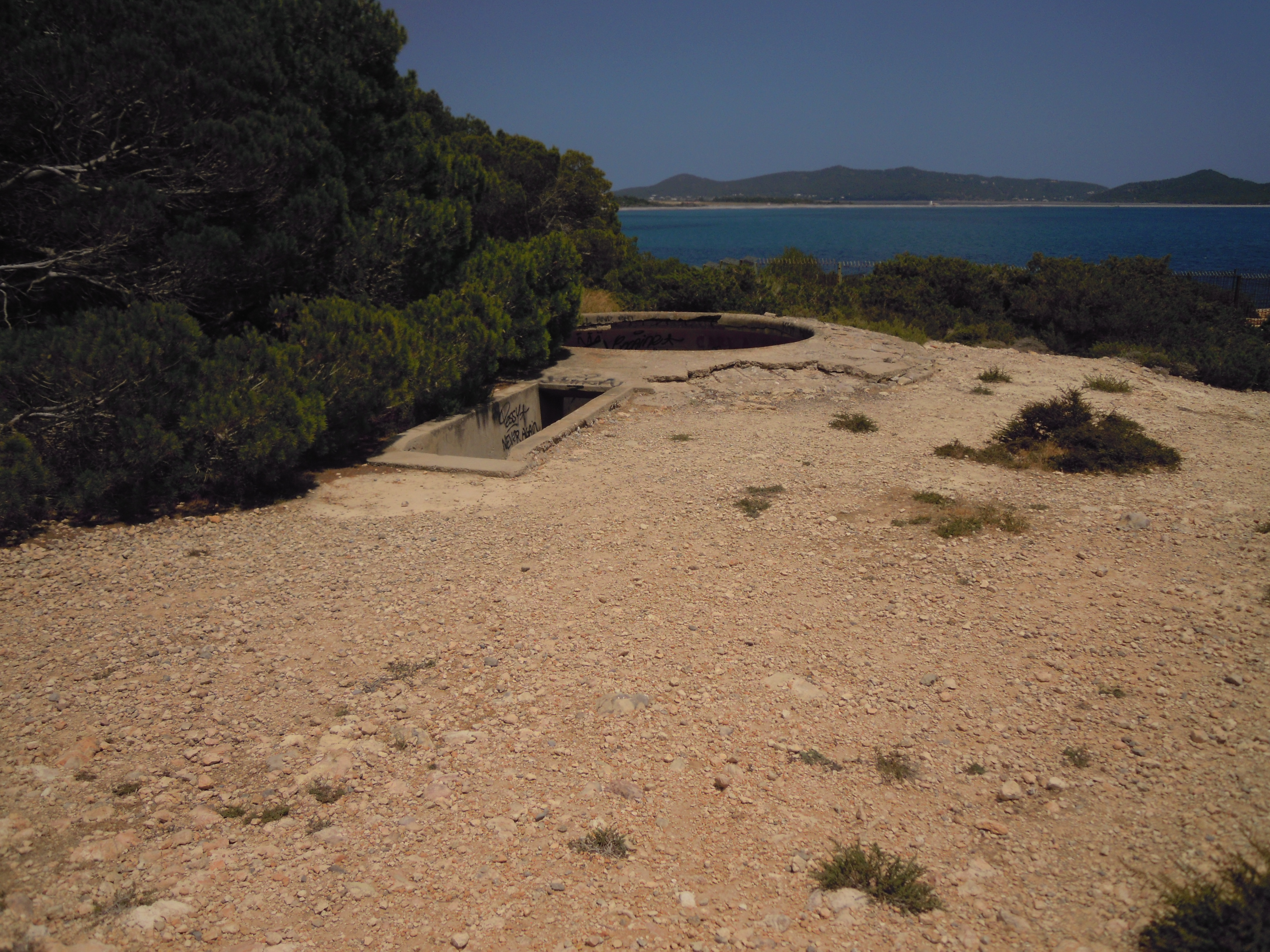

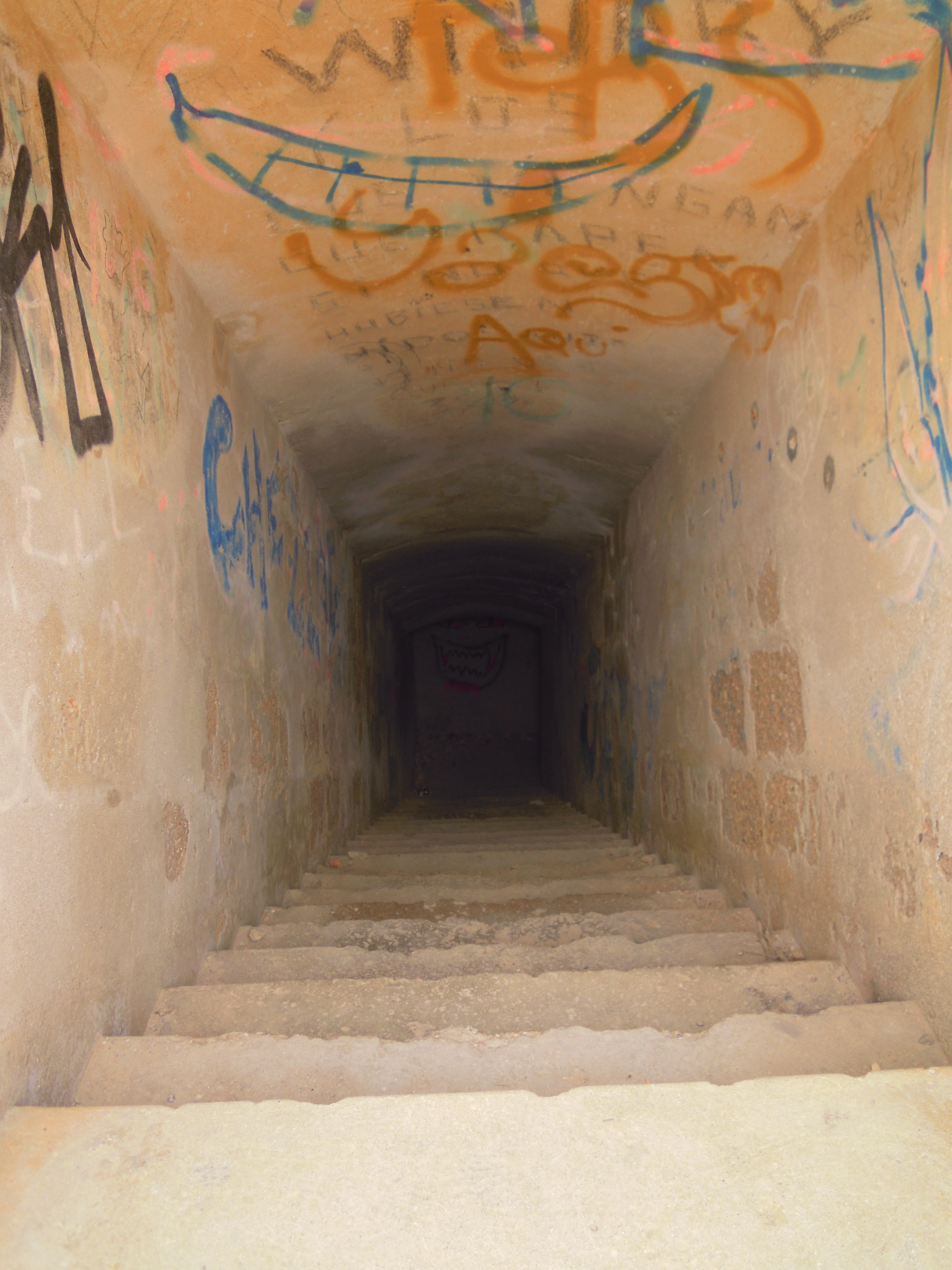

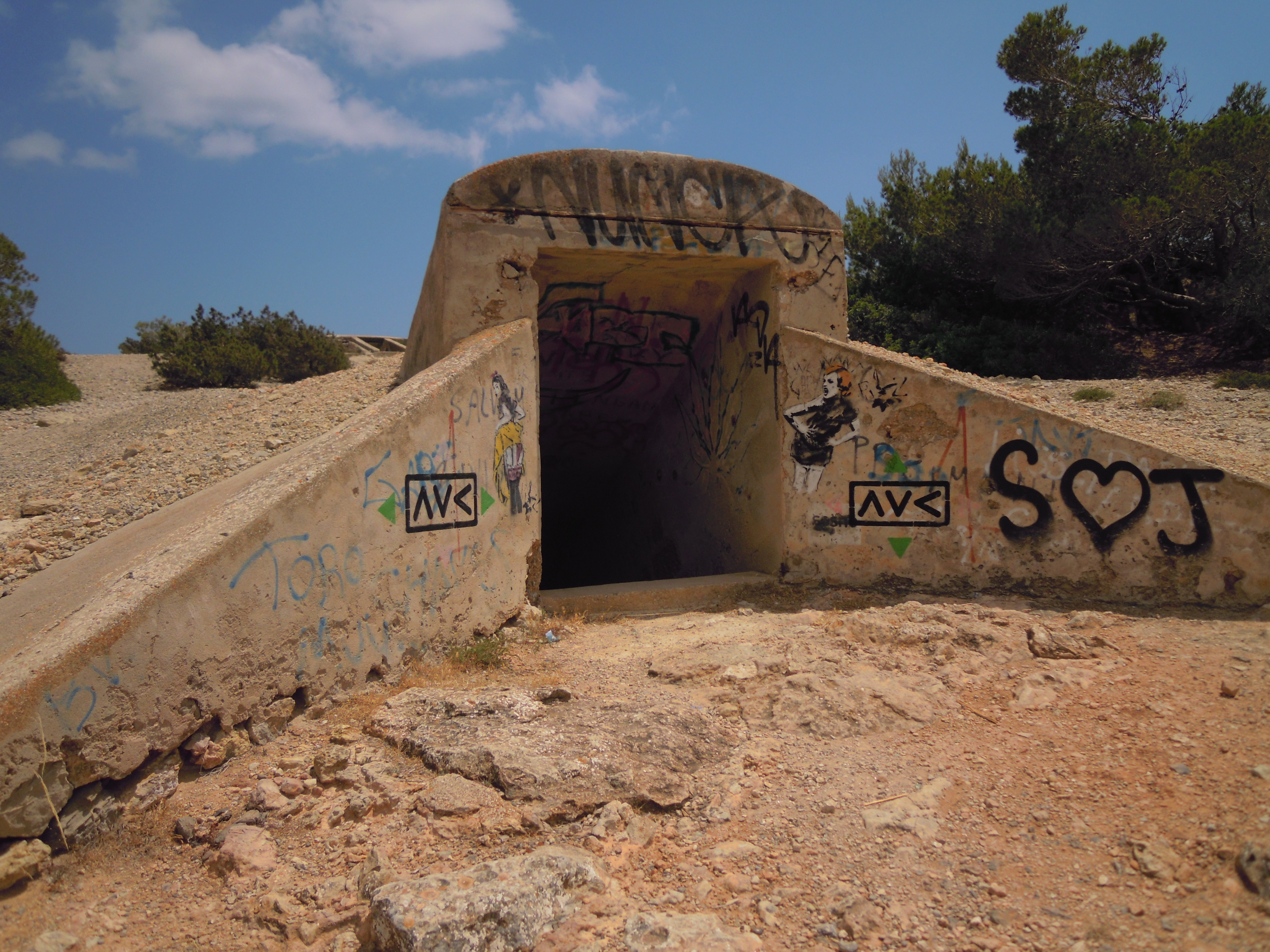

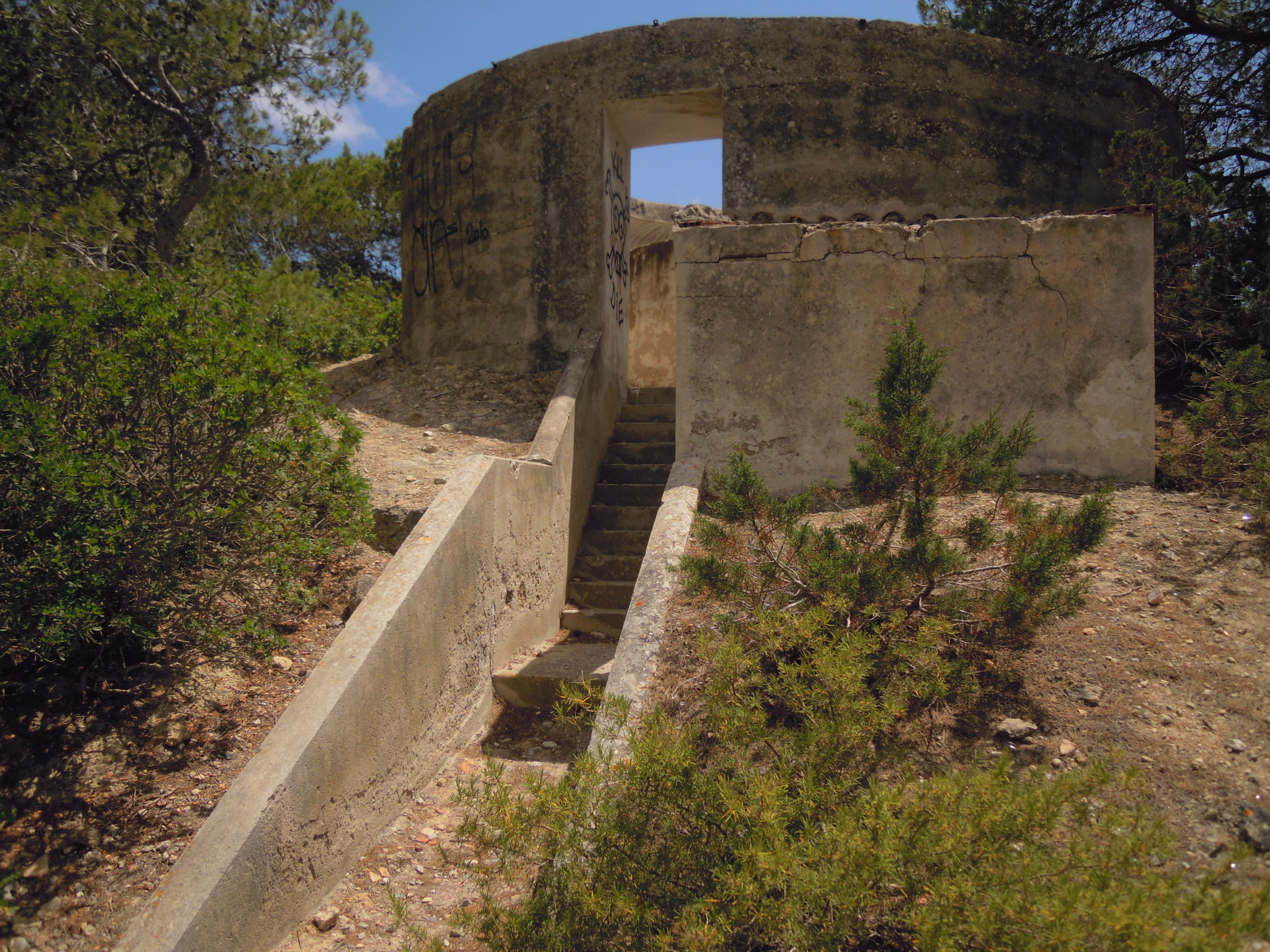

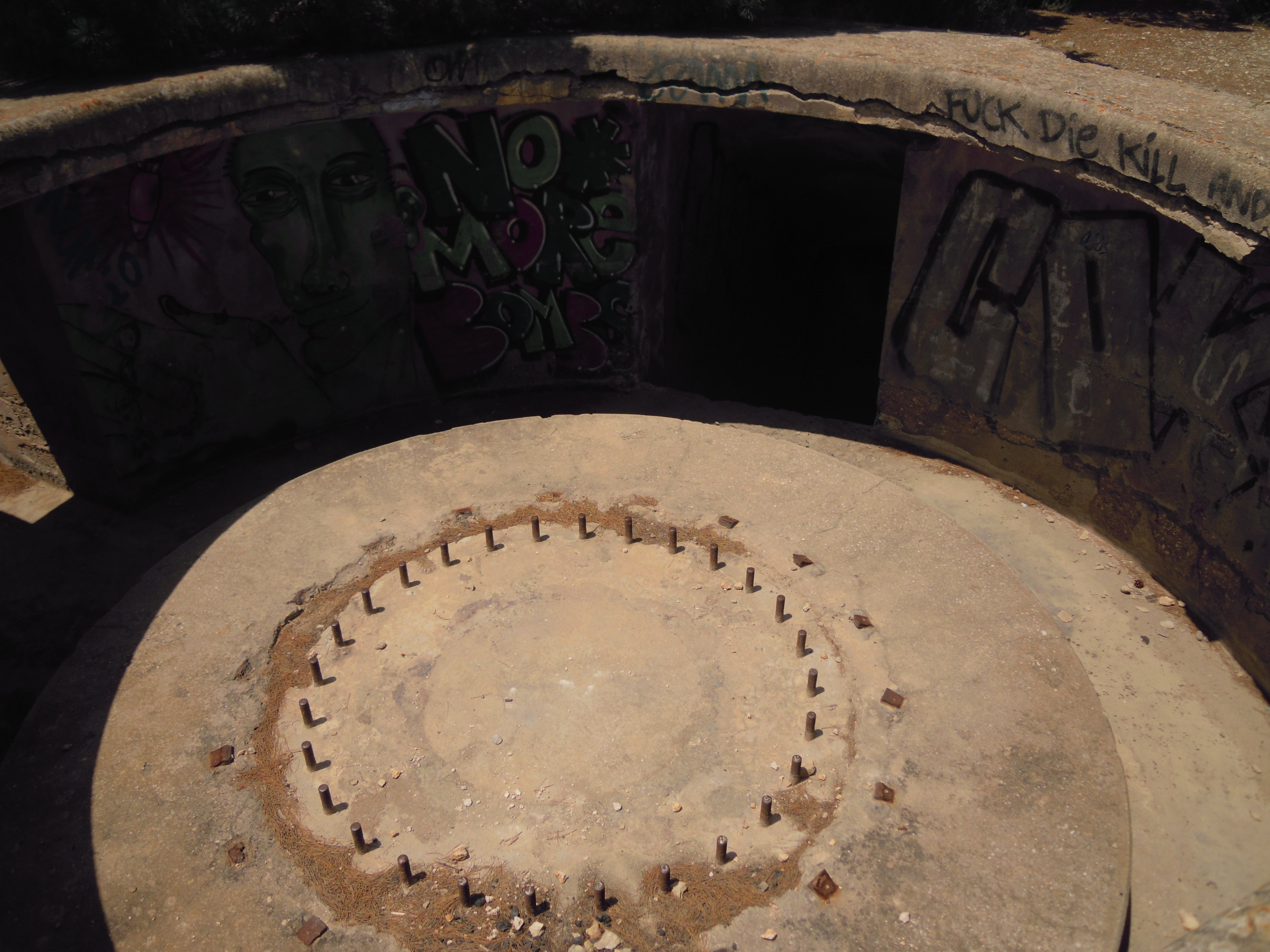

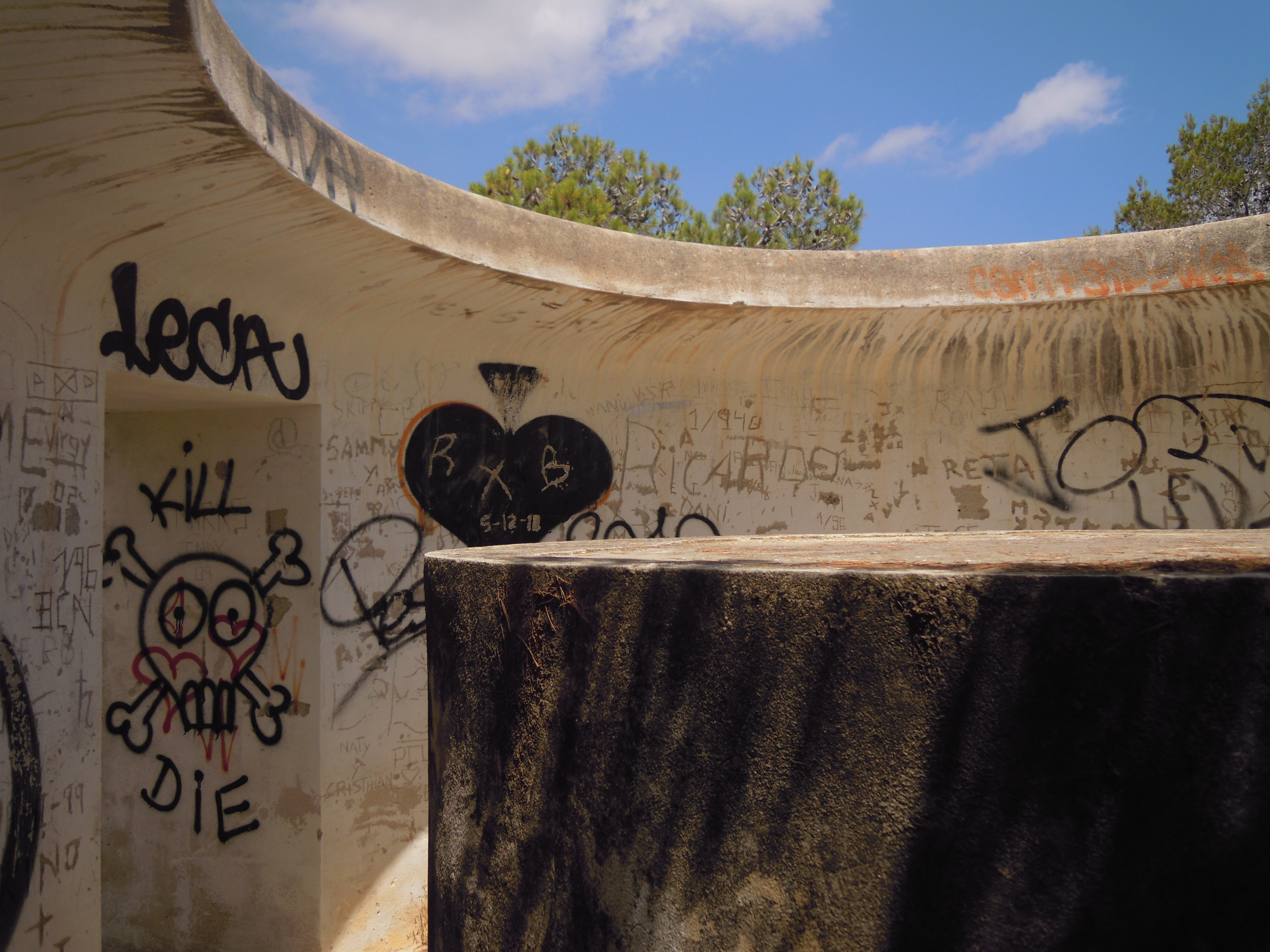

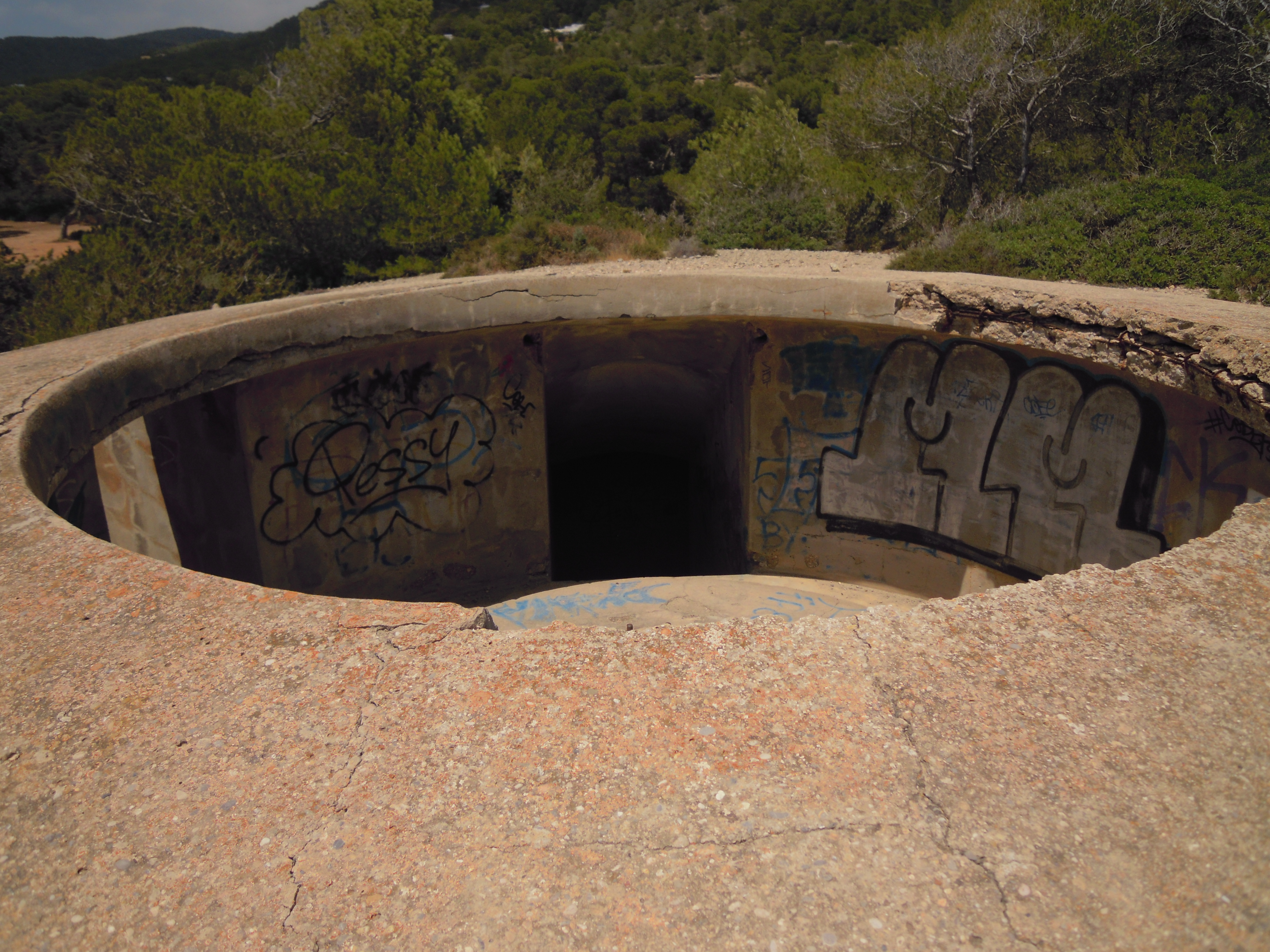

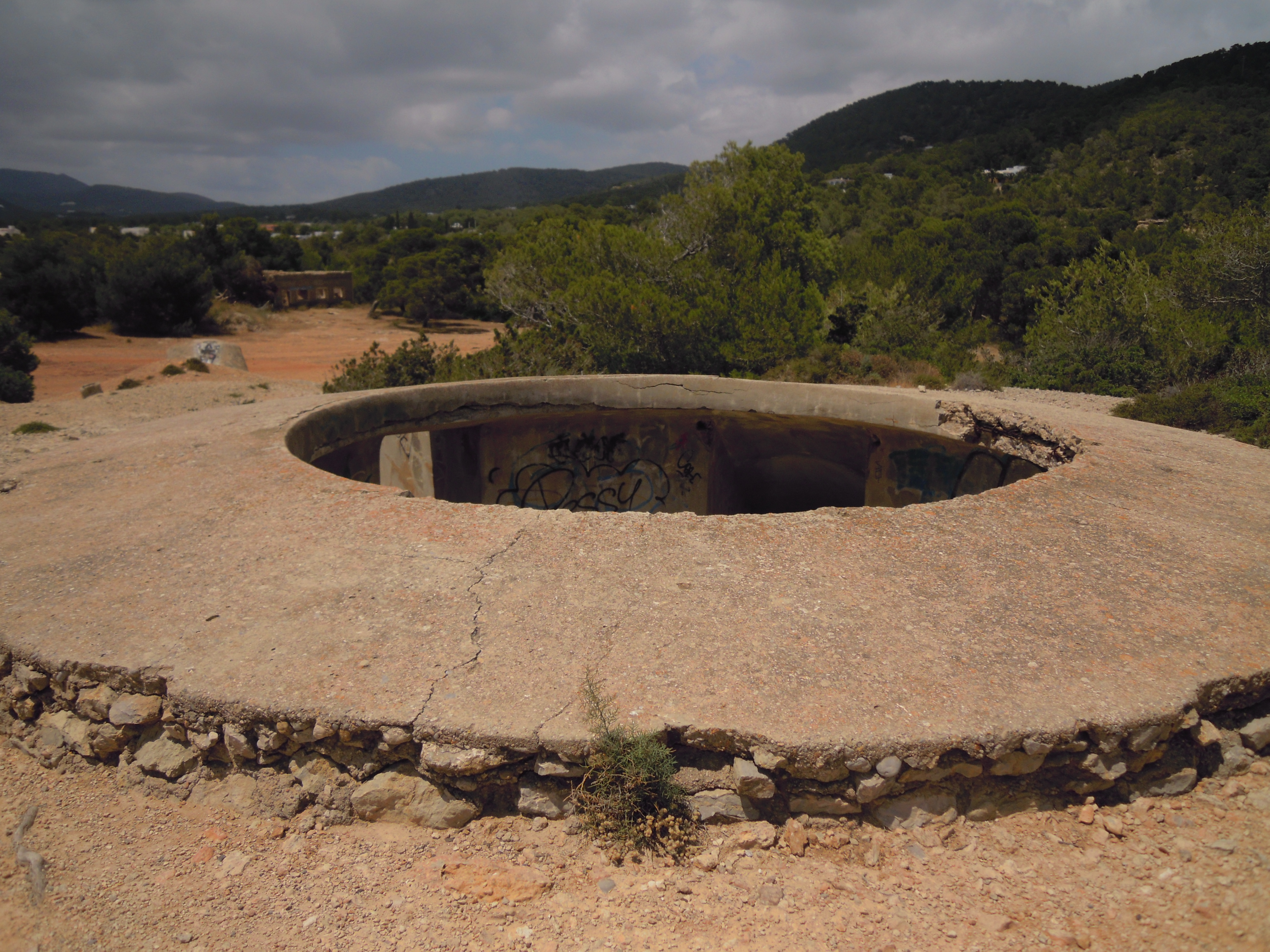
