= Sant Jordi de ses Salines =

- Village
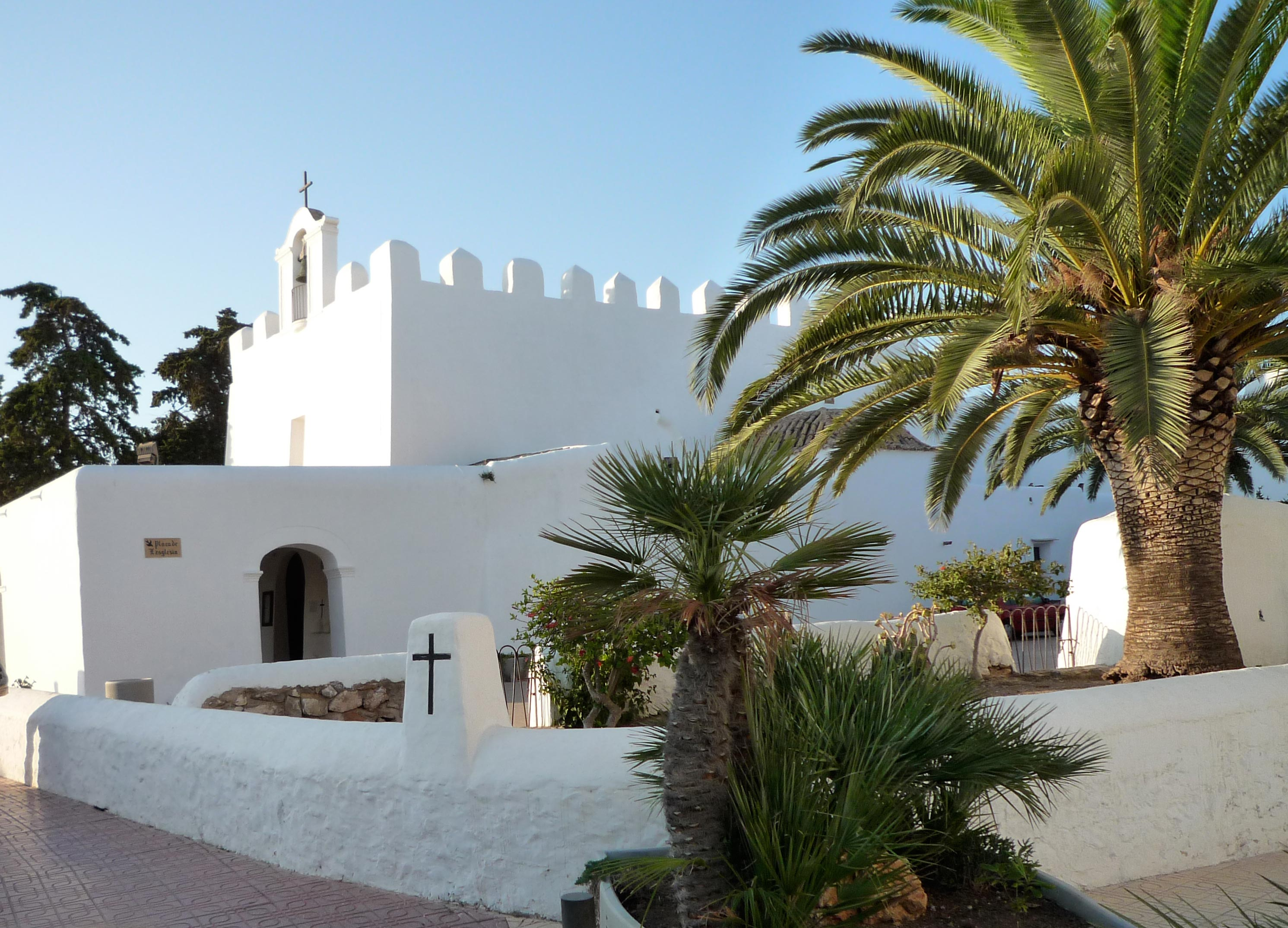
- The Parish church of Sant Jordi

- Location of the village in Ibiza
- Coordinates: 38°53′27″N 1°23′45″E
- Country: Spain
- Region: Balearic Islands

Population (2006)
  - Total: 8,048
- Time zone: UTC+1 (CET)
  - Summer (DST): UTC+2 (CEST)

Sant Jordi de ses Salines is a small village in the south of the Spanish island of Ibiza. The village is in the municipality of Sant Josep de sa Talaia and is located close to the islands main Airport and straddles the designated road EI-800. The village is 2.5 miles (4.0 km) south west of Ibiza Town and 2.3 miles (3.7 km) of Ibiza Airport.
