= Sant Josep de sa Talaia =

- Village
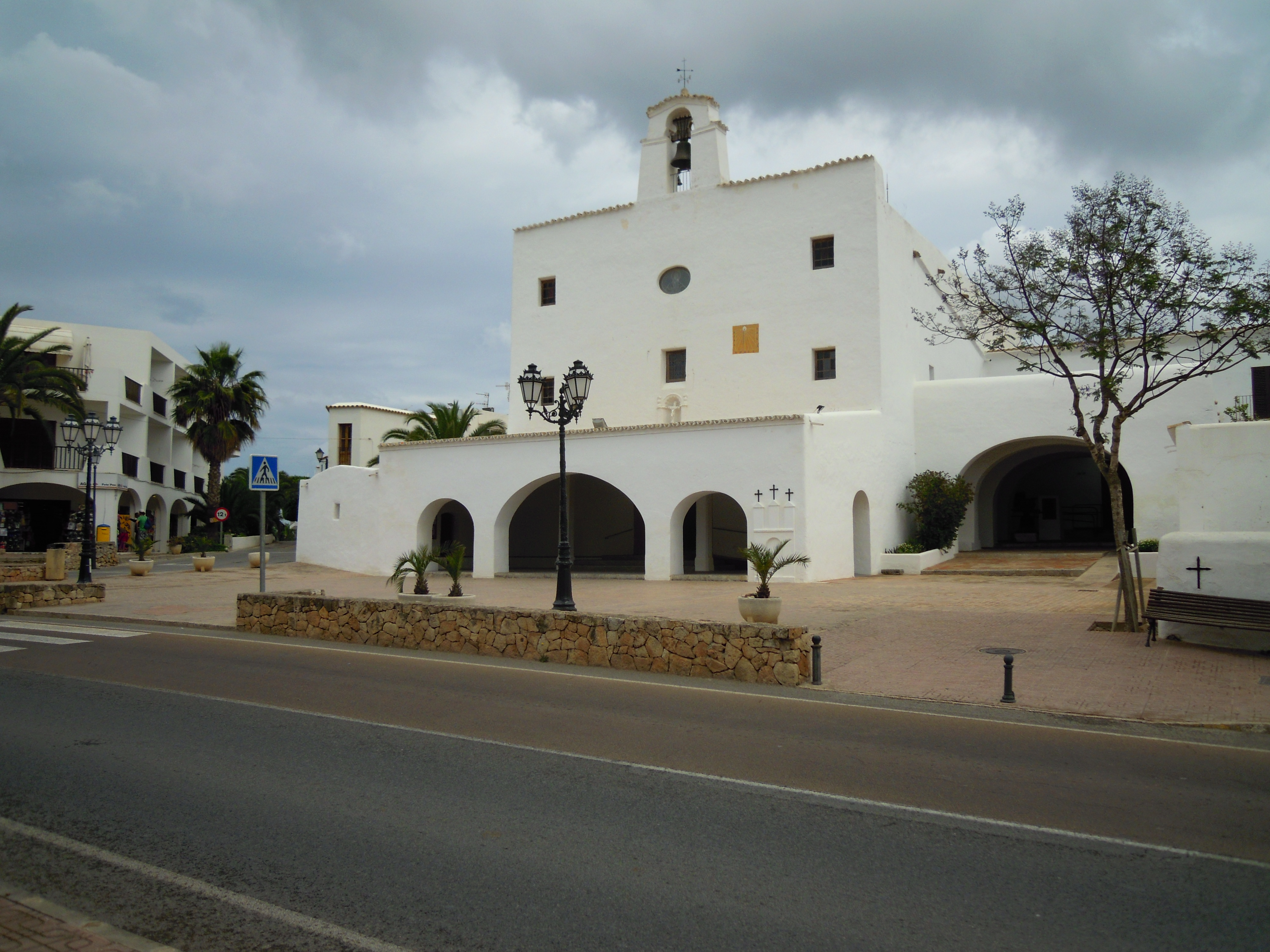

- Seal

- Location of the town in Ibiza
- Coordinates: 38°55′18″N 1°17′36″E
- Country: Spain
- Autonomous community: Balearic Islands

Population (2006)
  - Total: 26,133
- Time zone: UTC+1 (CET)
  - Summer (DST): UTC+2 (CEST)
- Website: Town council website

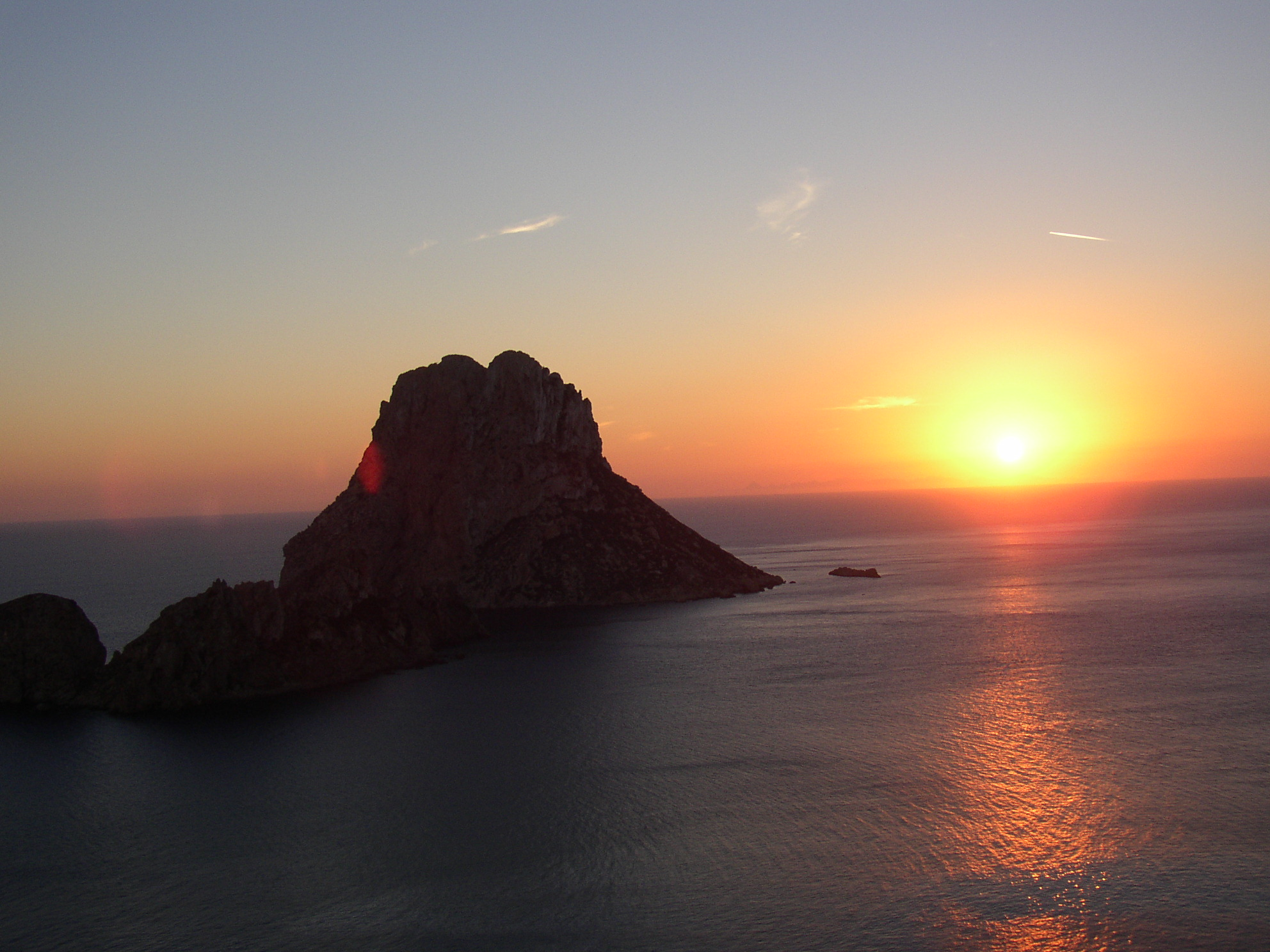
Es Vedrà located off Cala d'Hort

Sant Josep de sa Talaia (Balearic Catalan: [ˈsaɲ ʒuˈzɛb də sə təˈlajə]; Spanish: San José Obrero) is a village and municipality of the Balearic Islands in western Ibiza. The village is 10.7 miles (17.2 km) west of the capital Eivissa and is located on the EI-700 highway between Eivissa town and Sant Antoni de Portmany. The town is 6.5 miles (10.5 km) from the island's airport. As of 2006, the population of the municipality is 26,133.

== The Parish Church of Sant Josep de sa Talaia ==
In the early years of the 17th century the population of village had grown considerably. At this time the nearest place of worship was at Sant Antoni de Portmany and the local population needed a church somewhat closer to their homes. In 1726 the inhabitants of the area then named es Vedrans and Benimussa asked the archbishop of Tarragona, Manuel de Samaniego y Jaca, who was visiting the island, to approved the building of a new church. The archbishop agreed to this request and on 15 August 1729 the first mass was held on the site.

=== Construction ===
A master builder from Denia in province of Alicante, called Pere Ferro, was employed as construction supervisor in 1730 and construction began. Master Pere Ferro had a good reputation and had previously been employed by Pope Pius VI to work on the renovations of cathedral of Santa Maria de Eivissa in the capital. The master builder was assisted by members of the local families in the construction. Even the women and young girls of the village lent a hand by carrying water from the "Font des Verger" well to the site. In 1731 the last keystone was laid in the vaulted roof which marked the completion of the church. The church which had been dedicated to Saint Joseph and in 1785 it became the Parish church.

=== Visiting ===
The Parish Church of Sant Josep de sa Talaia is one of the most popular churches to visit on the island. Many holidaymakers find their way here as part of official island tours. Unfortunately many of the churches original religious art works were damaged or destroyed in the violence of the Spanish Civil War of 1936. The wooden baroque style pulpit did survive and dates from between 1761 and 1763. The pulpit is decorated with a representation of the mysteries and was painted by Josep Sánchez Ocaria of Mallorca. Despite the damage to the churches artefacts the Patrimony Department and the Saint Joseph parish continue an ongoing program of restoration work to the works of art. Two such restored works are a statue of Saint Anne the mother of the Virgin Mary and a painting of the Ecce Homo by Sánchez de Ocaña. The church has a single Nave which has a barrel vaulted roof. The walls to the side of the nave have several smaller chapels.

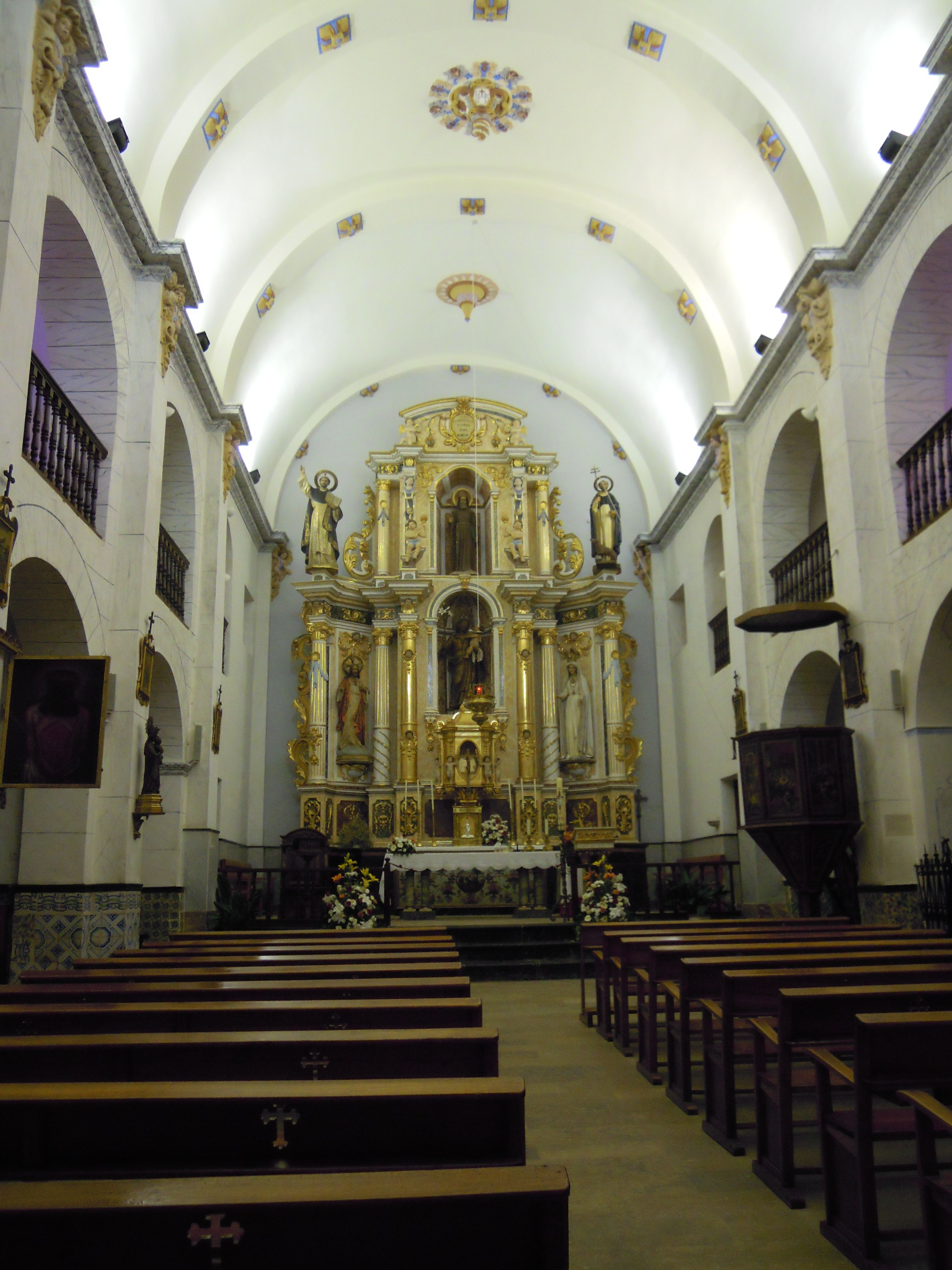

== Points of interest ==
- Sublimotion, Michelin 2-star restaurant considered the most expensive in the world

== See also ==
- The Municipality of Sant Josep de sa Talaia
- Sa Caleta Phoenician Settlement
