= Sa Caleta Phoenician Settlement =

Human settlement

Sa Caleta
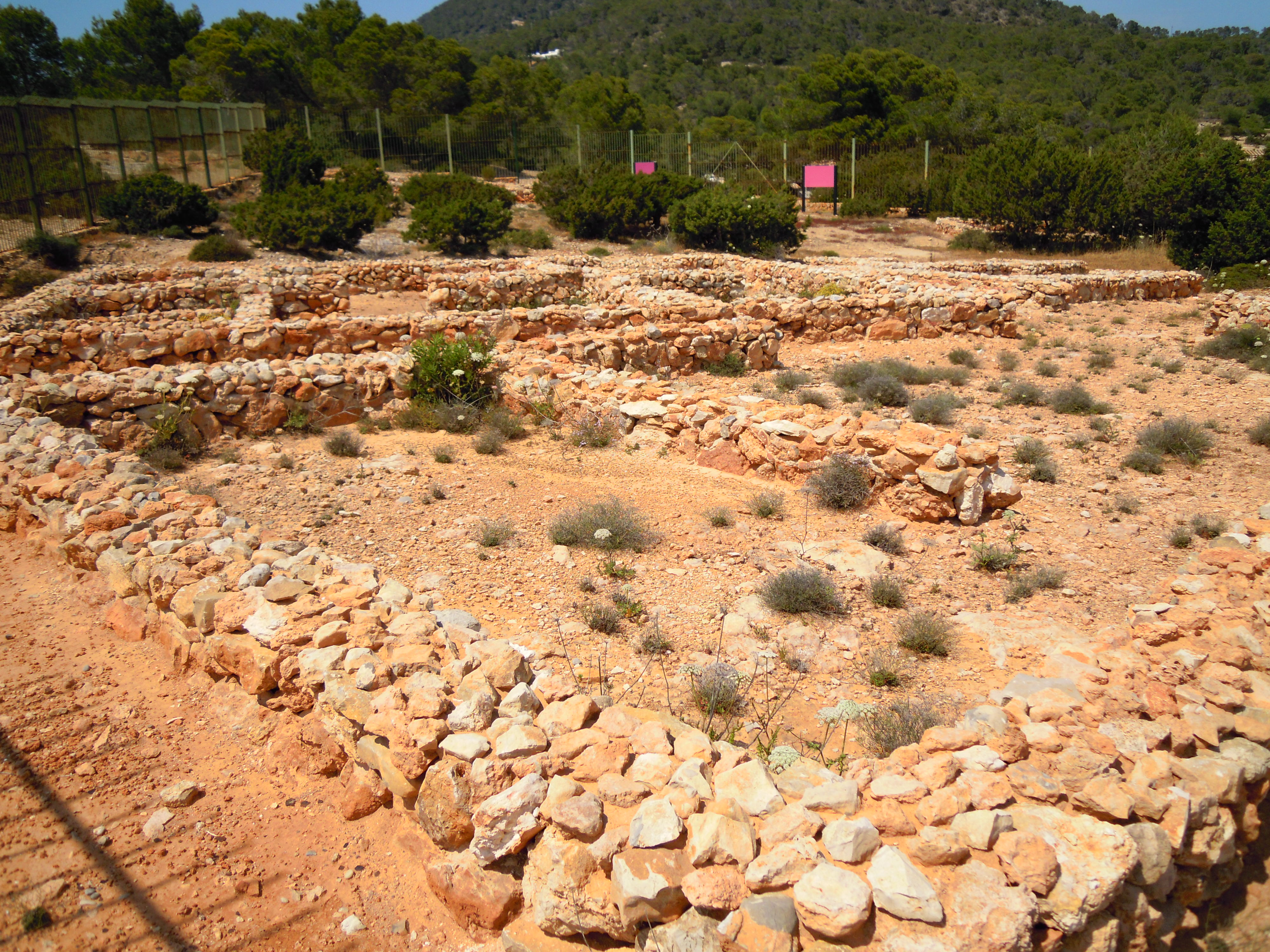
- Ruins of the Phoenician settlement of Sa Caleta

- Location within Spain
- 38.866932°N 1.334834°E
- Type: Settlement
- Location: 10 km (6.2 mi) from Ibiza Town, Ibiza
- Region: Ibiza

History
- Built: c. 654–650 BC
- Abandoned: c. 604–600 BC

Site notes
- Condition: Ruins
- Management: Consell d’Eivissa
- Public access: Limited

Sa Caleta is an archaeological site featuring the ruins of an ancient Phoenician settlement on a rocky headland about 10 kilometers west of Ibiza Town in Spain's Balearic Islands. The Phoenicians established a foothold in this area around 654–650 BC, and the site was abandoned by 600 BC. The discovery of the foundations of simple stone buildings at this site led to Sa Caleta being designated a UNESCO World Heritage Site in 1999.

== History and location ==
The Phoenicians began arriving on the island of Ibiza around 650 BC, and constructed this settlement on the rocky headland at Sa Caleta. This large Phoenician settlement was uncovered by archaeologists during the 1980s and 1990s under the auspices of the Consell Insular d’Eivissa i Formentera. The site was declared a World Heritage Site in December 1999. It consists of an urban area with streets and a small square, conventionally referred to as ‘neighbourhoods’. The Phoenicians who first settled here had arrived from the Iberian coast and settled here progressively until all the usable space on this headland had become a veritable urban center and once covered a surface area of four hectares.

=== Economic activities ===
A factor in the choice of the location was its proximity to the natural salt marshes of the island. The Phoenicians exploited this valuable natural commodity. The shallow pools of seawater within the marsh evaporated under the hot summer sun enjoyed by the island, leaving a gleaming crust of salt crystals. The Phoenicians collected these deposits and so began the first commercial enterprise of the island. The settlers also engaged in other activities which included fishing, baking, weaving and metalworking, all of which was used to trade to supplement the meager local produce of the island.

== Visiting ==
Sa Caleta is located on the southwest coast of the island of Ibiza, about 10 kilometers from Ibiza Town.

The site is preserved behind tall iron railings behind which are the restored and preserved footings of several dwellings. The remains have been designated the ‘southern quarter’ of the settlement by the archaeologists who have excavated the site. Most of the buildings, of which there are half a dozen, are grouped around narrow streets and courtyards. The main construction of these buildings would have been built from stone and mud-brick with flat clay roofs supported on timber rafters. Most of the buildings consisted of just one room and were a combination of living space, workshops and store rooms. There is one building in the centre of the site which has multiple rooms and may have been a structure of some importance in its day. The plan of this house is comparable to other Phoenician dwellings excavated in other parts of the Mediterranean, and is not dissimilar to the layout of the traditional house built on Ibiza until recent times. The excavations on the central area near the top of the headland revealed an orderly arrangement of building in the form of a terrace, although this area has not been conserved for public viewing. The site would have been larger, but many of the buildings to south have been lost to coastal erosion. To the North of the site much of the archaeology was destroyed during the Spanish Civil War when concrete gun emplacements, tunnel and huts were constructed on the headland as part of the islands elaborate defense system set up to guard against any Republican attack during mid 1937. This construction was built with no regard for the delicate archeology in the area. The small cove on the east side of Sa Caleta was once the busy natural harbor of the Phoenician settlers. It is still used today by a few local fishing boats and the occasional pleasure craft.
