= Pityusic Islands =

Island group in the Mediterranean Sea

Coordinates: 38°42′N 1°27′E

Illes Pitiüses • Islas Pitiusas
- Etymology: Greek: Πιτυοῦσσαι, romanized: Pityûssai, lit. 'pine-covered' (islands)

Geography
- Location: Mediterranean Sea
- Archipelago: Balearic Islands
- Area: 655.8 km^{2} (253.2 sq mi)
- Highest elevation: 475 m (1558 ft)
- Highest point: Sa Talaiassa

Administration
- Spain
- Autonomous Community: Balearic Islands
- Province: Balearic Islands
- Largest settlement: Ibiza (pop. 49,783)

Demographics
- Population: 160,025 (1 January 2019)
- Pop. density: 244.0/km^{2} (632/sq mi)

The Pityusic Islands, often referenced simply as the Pityuses (Catalan: Pitiüses [pitiˈuzəs], Spanish: Pitiusas [pitiˈusas]; from the Greek πιτύα pitýa, pine tree), or commonly but informally (and ambiguously) as the Pine Islands, is the name given collectively to Spain's Balearic Islands of Ibiza (Catalan: Eivissa), Formentera, S'Espalmador and other small islets in the Mediterranean Sea.

== Geography ==
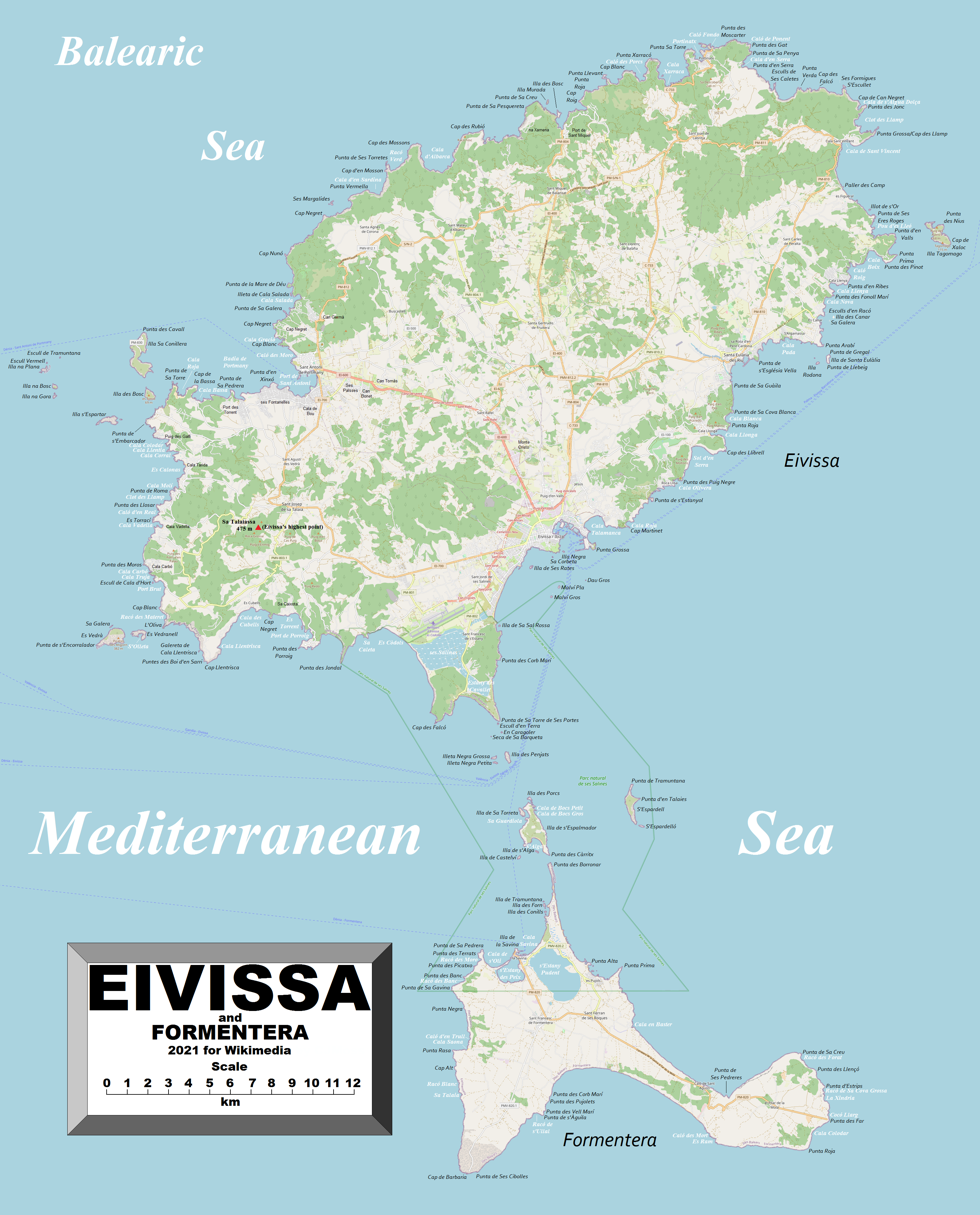
Enlargeable, detailed map of Eivissa and Formentera

The islands are situated approximately 100 kilometres (62 miles) southwest of the island of Mallorca, and approximately 80 km (50 mi) east of the Cap de la Nau in the Iberian Peninsula.

== History ==
The first known name of the islands was the Ancient Greek geonym Πιτυοῦσσαι Pityûssai ("covered in pine trees").

From about 200 BCE, the islands were used as a base by Cilician pirates. They and a renegade Roman general, Quintus Sertorius, who had formed an alliance with the pirates, were driven out by a large Roman fleet, commanded by Caius Annius Luscus.

The two largest of the islands, under the names Ebyssus (Ibiza) and Ophiusis (Formentera), were listed in Claudius Ptolemy's Geography (2nd century CE). Ptolemy noted that Ebyssus had a town by the same name.

== Administration ==
The Pine Islands are sometimes grouped together as part of the Balearic Islands, or else considered separate with the Balearics proper being Mallorca and Menorca (which together with their islets form the Gymnesian Islands). Politically, they are part of the autonomous community of the Balearic Islands.

Initially, they were administratively part of the same insular council (of Ibiza and Formentera), but since 2007 they are now separated between the insular council of Ibiza and the insular council of Formentera (each one is also assimilated to a single comarca), which are two of the four main administrative subdivisions of the province (and autonomous community) of the Balearic Islands.

== Gallery ==
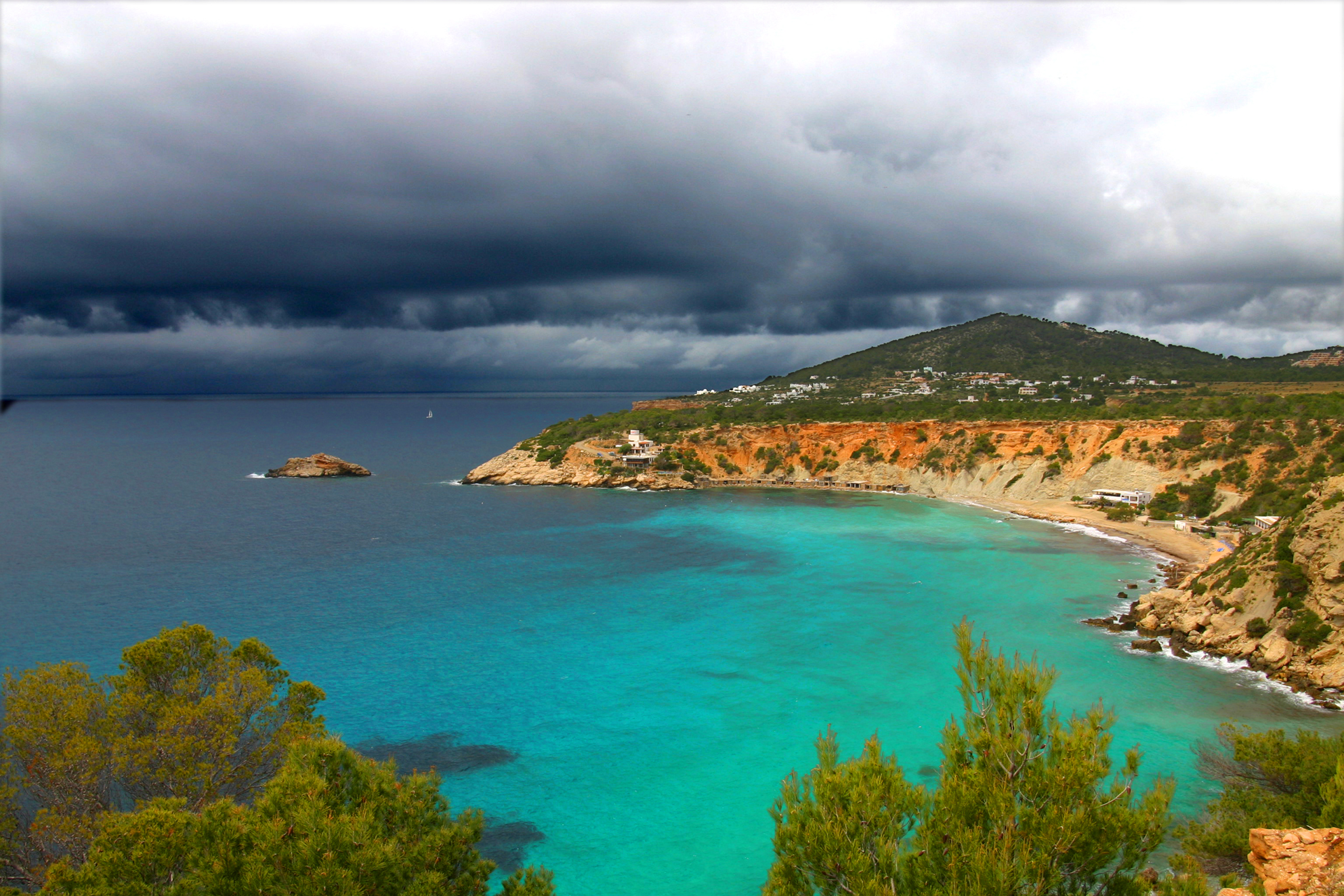
Beach on Ibiza

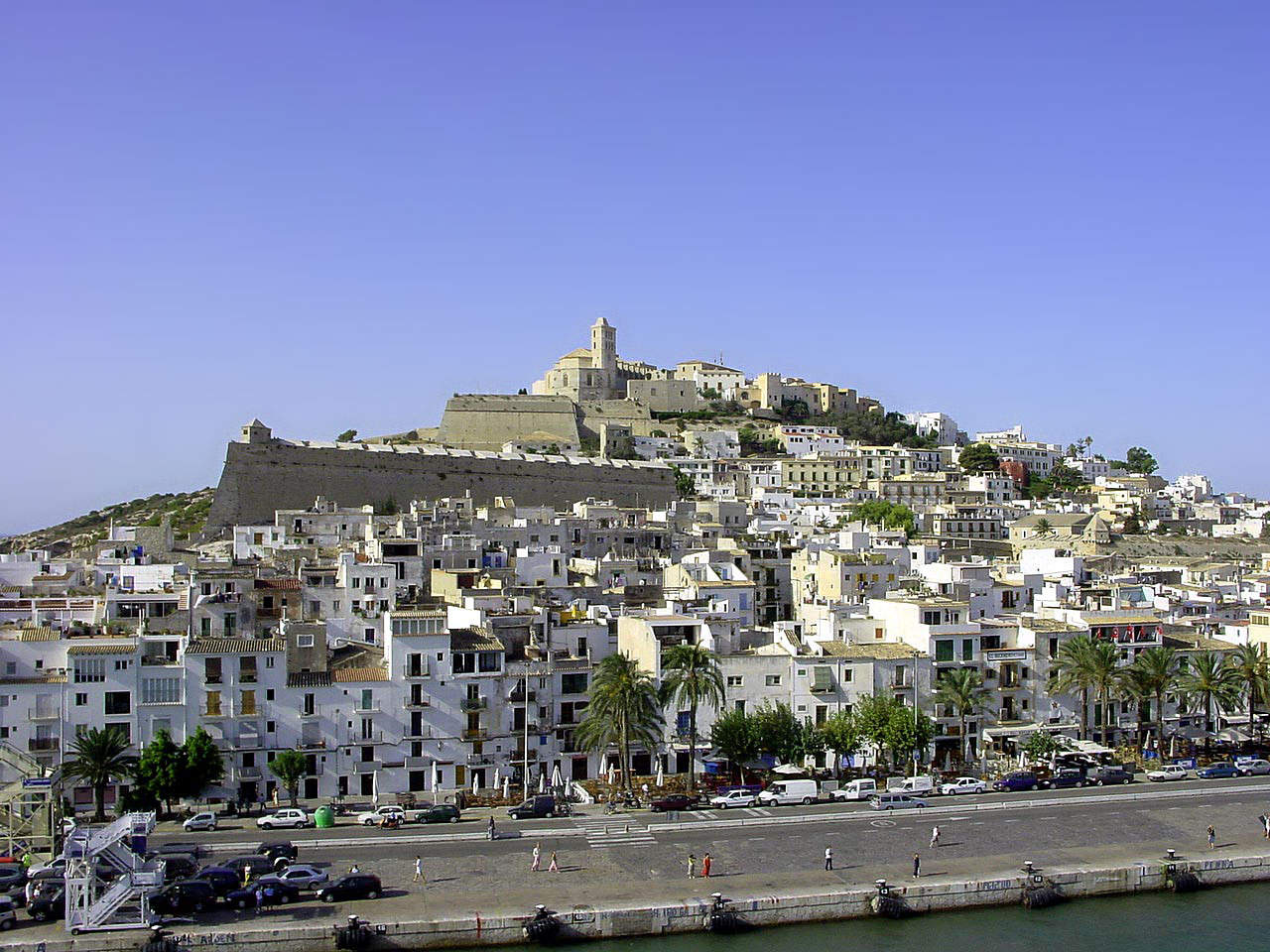
Ibiza Town

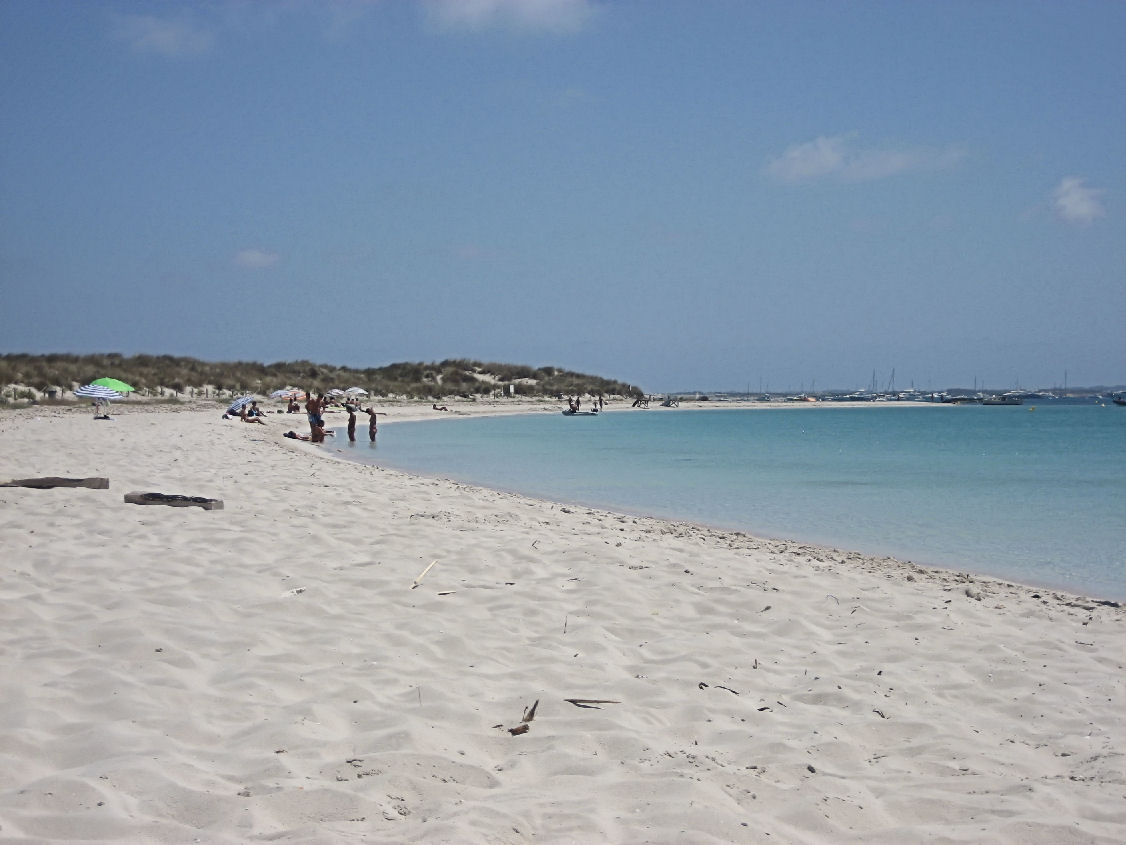
Beach on Formentera

== Flags and coats of arms ==
Flag of Ibiza

Flag of Formentera

Emblem of the Island Council of Ibiza

Coat of arms of Sant Antoni de Portmany

Coat of arms of Sant Joan de Labritja

Coat of arms of Santa Eulària des Riu

Coat of arms of Ibiza

== See also ==
- Gymnesian Islands (Illes Gimnèsies)
