= Ses Feixes Wetlands =

Area of wetland in Ibiza, Spain

- Wetlands
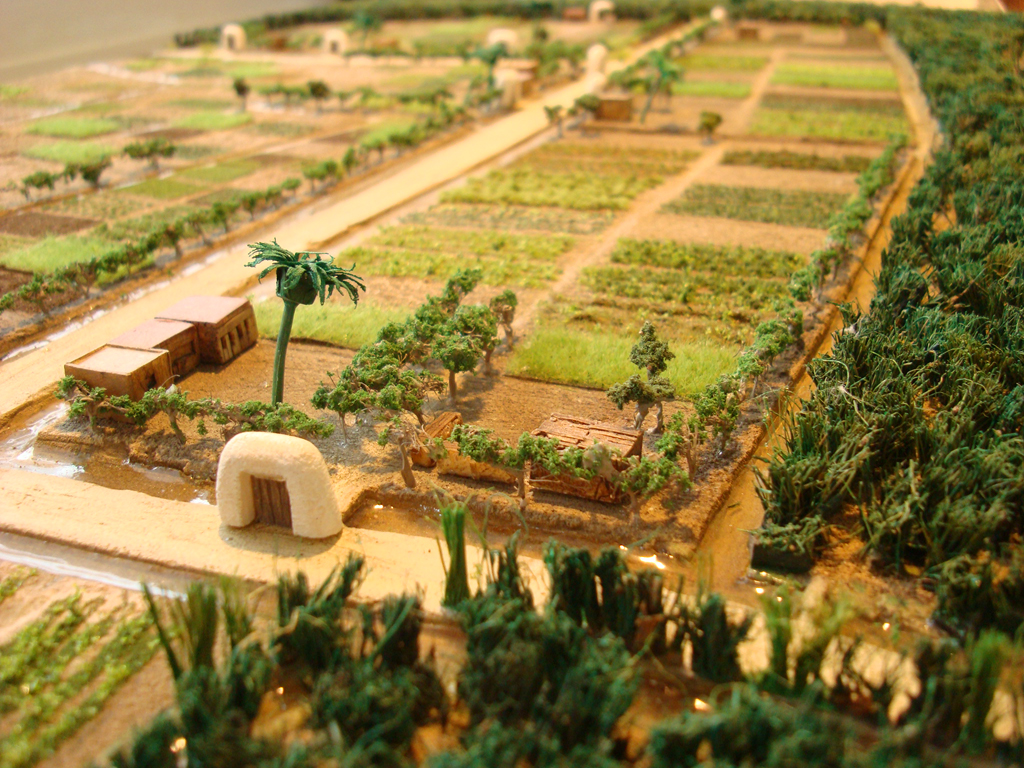
- Plot Compuertas (Gateway); Ses Feixes Wetlands

- Location of Ses Feixes on Ibiza
- Coordinates: 38°55′4″N 1°27′5″E
- Location: Ibiza, Spain

Ses Feixes is an area of wetland on the Spanish island of Ibiza. The area is on the northern side of the municipality of Ibiza town.

== Description ==
The wetland area known as Ses Feixes is situated between Ibiza Town and runs in a crescent around Ibiza bay to Talamanca. These wet lowlands are an important wintering ground and resting place for many migratory birds and constitutes a key haven for wildlife. The wetlands support a great variety of fauna and flora and include rare bats, reptiles, and more than 140 species of birds. The area is very important as wetlands such as these are rapidly disappearing in the Mediterranean region.

== History ==
It was the Moors who brought with them to Ibiza the expertise and knowledge to turn dry parched land into usable fertile agricultural land. They constructed a complicated network of cisterns, reservoirs, waterwheels and irrigation canals. These schemes which included Ses Feixes transformed the original wetland into extremely productive land, by moving vast amounts of water away. This in turn gave the moors the water supply to free up the potential of dryer tracts of land. These schemes turned both wetland and the parched ground into fertile agricultural land. At Ses Feixes . These ingenious irrigation systems transformed the original wetland into extremely productive land, farmed until the late 1950s. Once the loose marshes soil of these wetlands had been reclaimed from the sea, a mosaic of long narrow plots (feixa or field) were created by running narrow canals (séquies) around the plots. These plots or strips were then crossed laterally by underground drainage culverts (Fibles). These culverts kept the soil above well watered. At the entrance to each tract of land there was a distinctive gateway called a (Compuertas) which also acted, in some cases, as a Hydraulic damper. The gateways were built from rendered stone and whitewashed and are reminiscent of similar structures seen in ancient Egypt and the Middle East. In there prime the fields at Ses Feixes produced harvests of vegetables on a duel rotation system each year. Produce such as cabbages, potatoes, tomatoes, melons, beans and Sweet potato grew in the fields

== Threatened environment ==
In the time that this once-productive environment has lain dormant, it has become increasingly under threat from the construction and development around the northern shore line of Ibiza bay. A new road was built in the 1970s, which cut off some of the wetland's water outlets and fragmented the original wetland into two smaller sections of Prat de Vila and Prat de Ses Monges, and the area now has suffered from total abandonment. The island's authorities have now designated the area as a green belt and UNESCO has recognized the importance of the site. Despite this recognition, the area is facing a new threat from developers. The Spanish government has given the go-ahead for a new harbor development. As part of the plans, it has been suggested that a new road be built to carry the expected increase in traffic. The route of this road could put it right through the fragile wetland area.

== Encouraging signs ==
The wetlands of Ses Feixes was made a Site of Cultural Interest (Bien de Interés Cultural) in 2006 and renewed in 2009, which can be considered as a positive step for conservation, as a buffer zone of the UNESCO World Heritage property of Ibiza. This will provide the area some protection but stronger measures are required to preserve the site perpetually. In November 2009 the UNESCO World Heritage property of Ibiza, Biodiversity and Culture reported that the Ses Feixes areas of Prat de Vila and Prat de Ses Monges should be included in to the world heritage site as they have great value in their own right and are evidence of the ingenious Moorish system of land cultivation, but they represent the best evidence of the mixed cultural and natural values of the world heritage site. The wetland system of the Ses Feixes has an important relationship with the off shore Posidonia oceanica meadows.

== The future ==
Recently some restoration work has been carried out on the ancient portals, along with cleaning of the main drainage canals. In the future it is hoped that an interpretation centre will be built, an event which would mark an important step in the area's preservation, if implemented. The Ibiza Preservation Fund has furnish projects to raise awareness of the environmental and cultural significance of this ancient wetland.

Eight hectares of wetland were destroyed within two hours in an intentional fire on 6 March 2017. The current conditions of the Feixes and the future of this land are unclear.

== Gallery ==
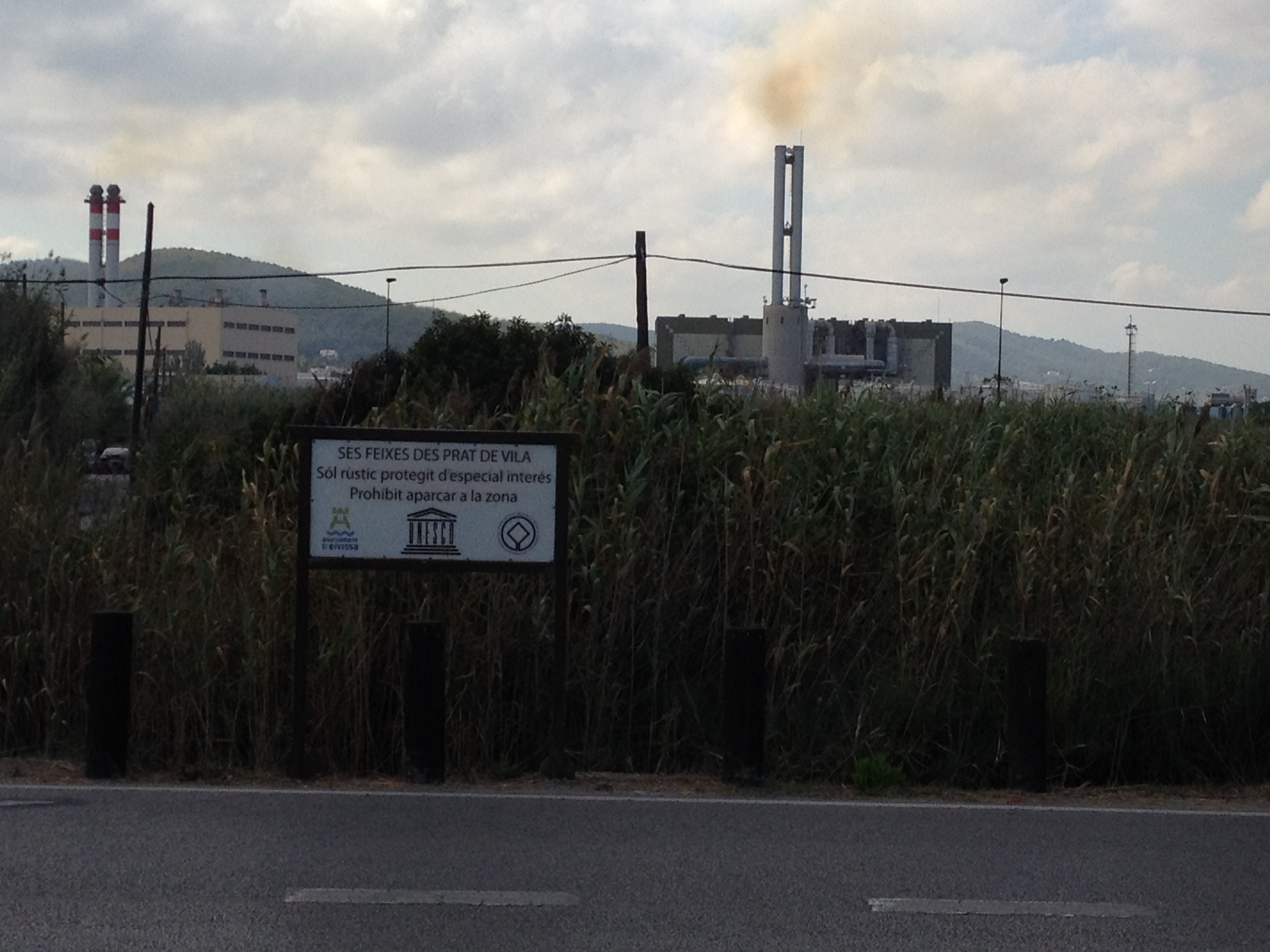
Ses Feixes Des Prat De Vila

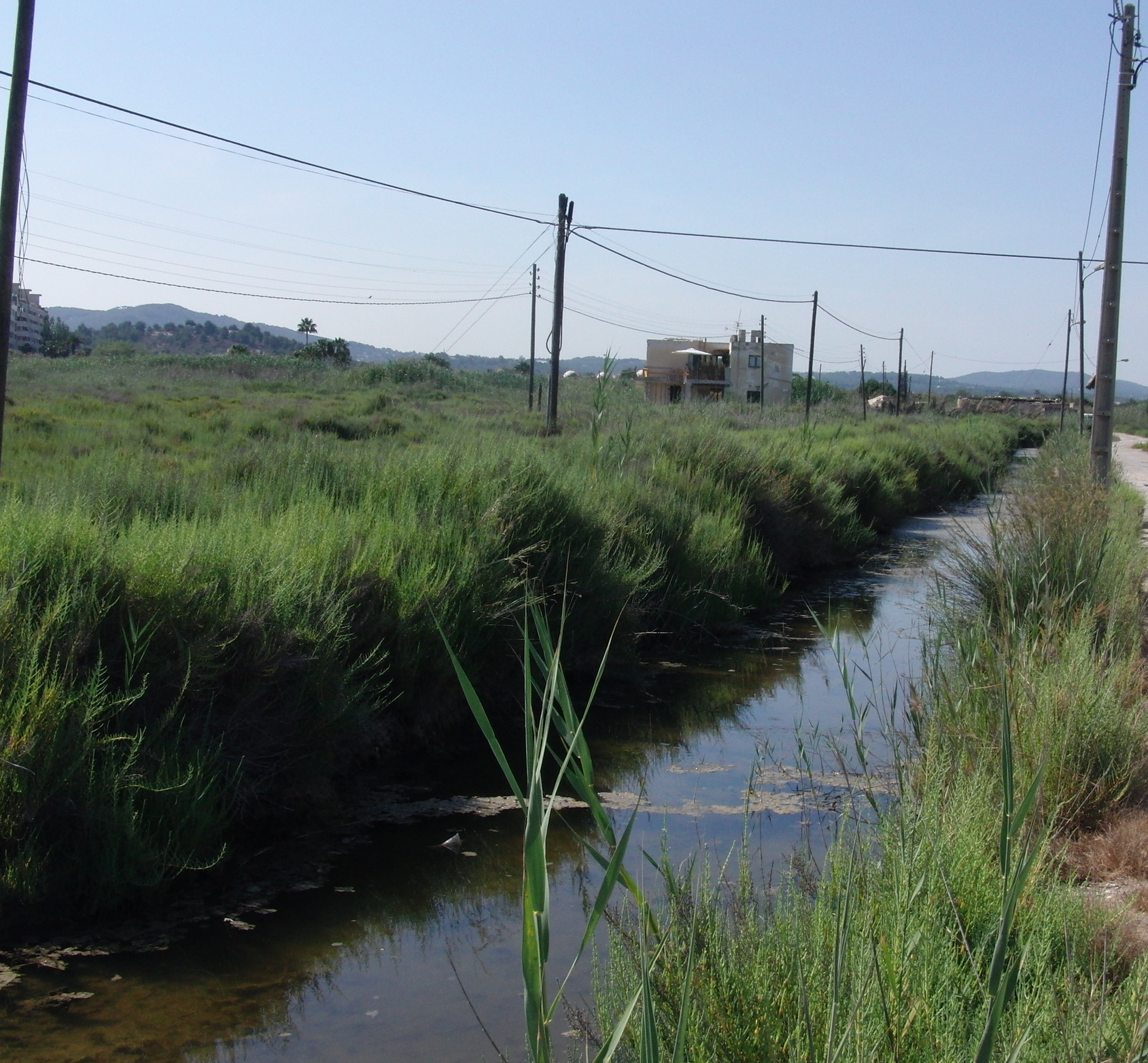
Ses Feixes Prat De Ses Monges (Talamanca)

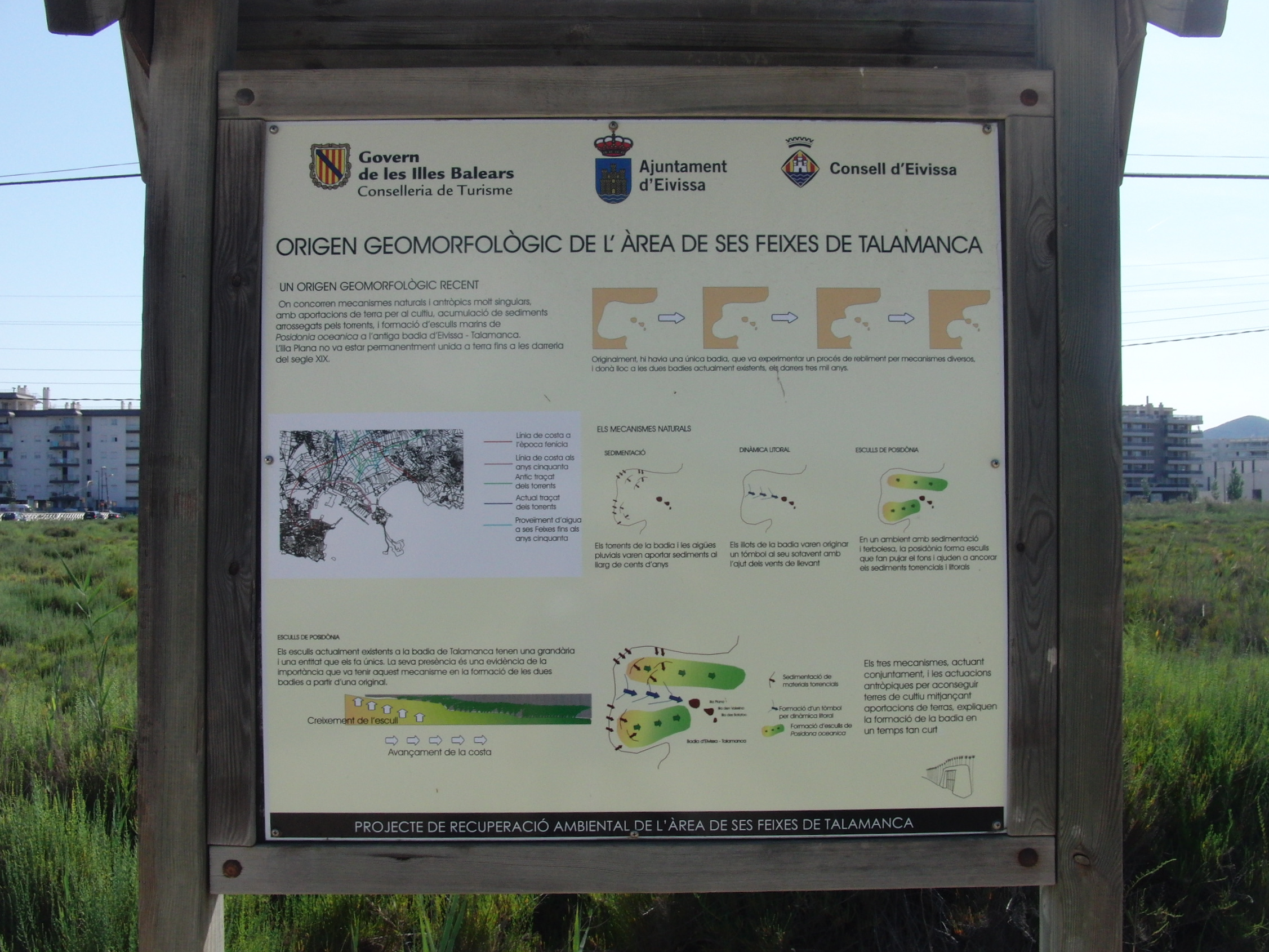
Explanation De Ses Feixes

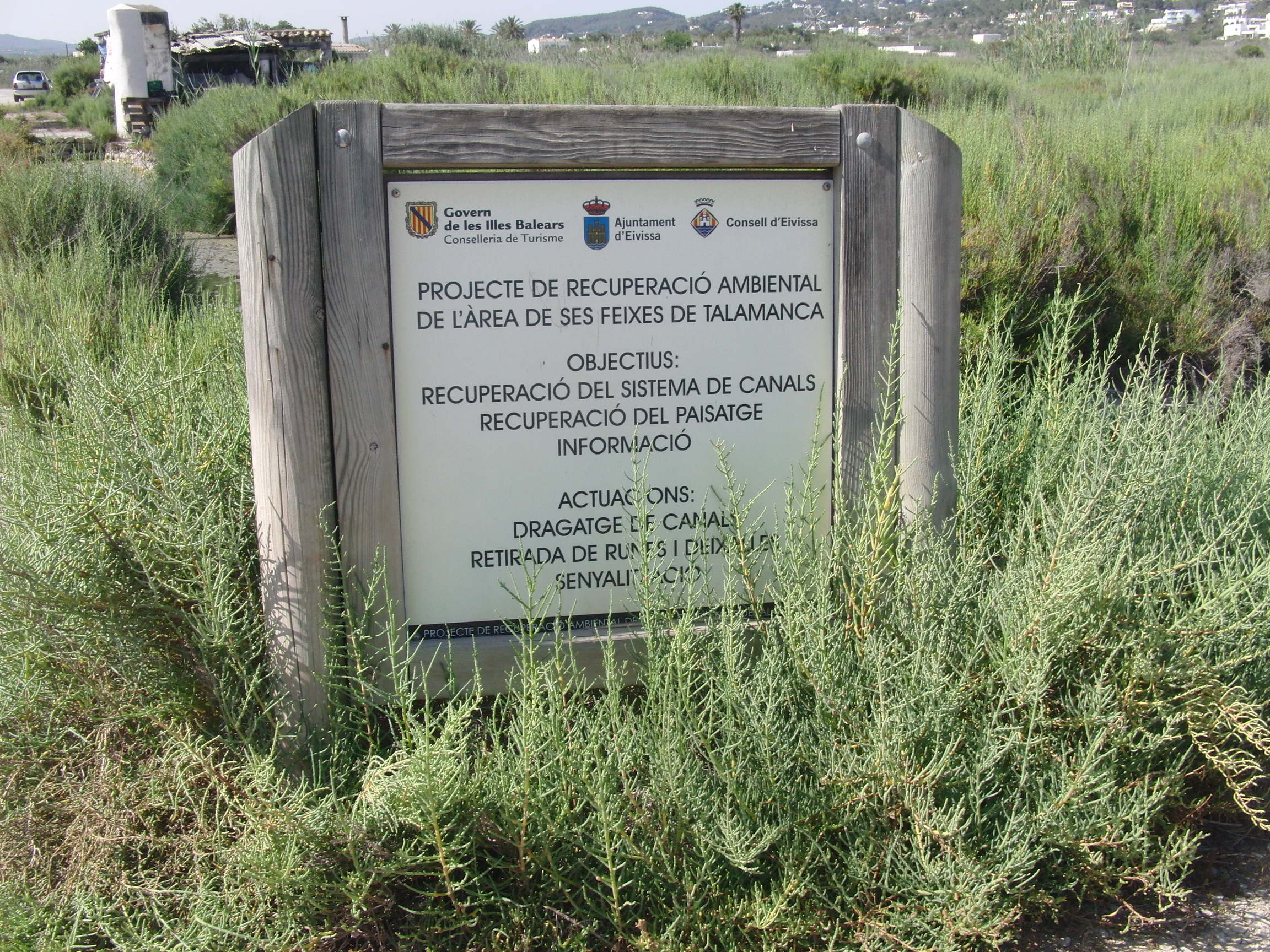
Ses Feixes, Cultural Heritage

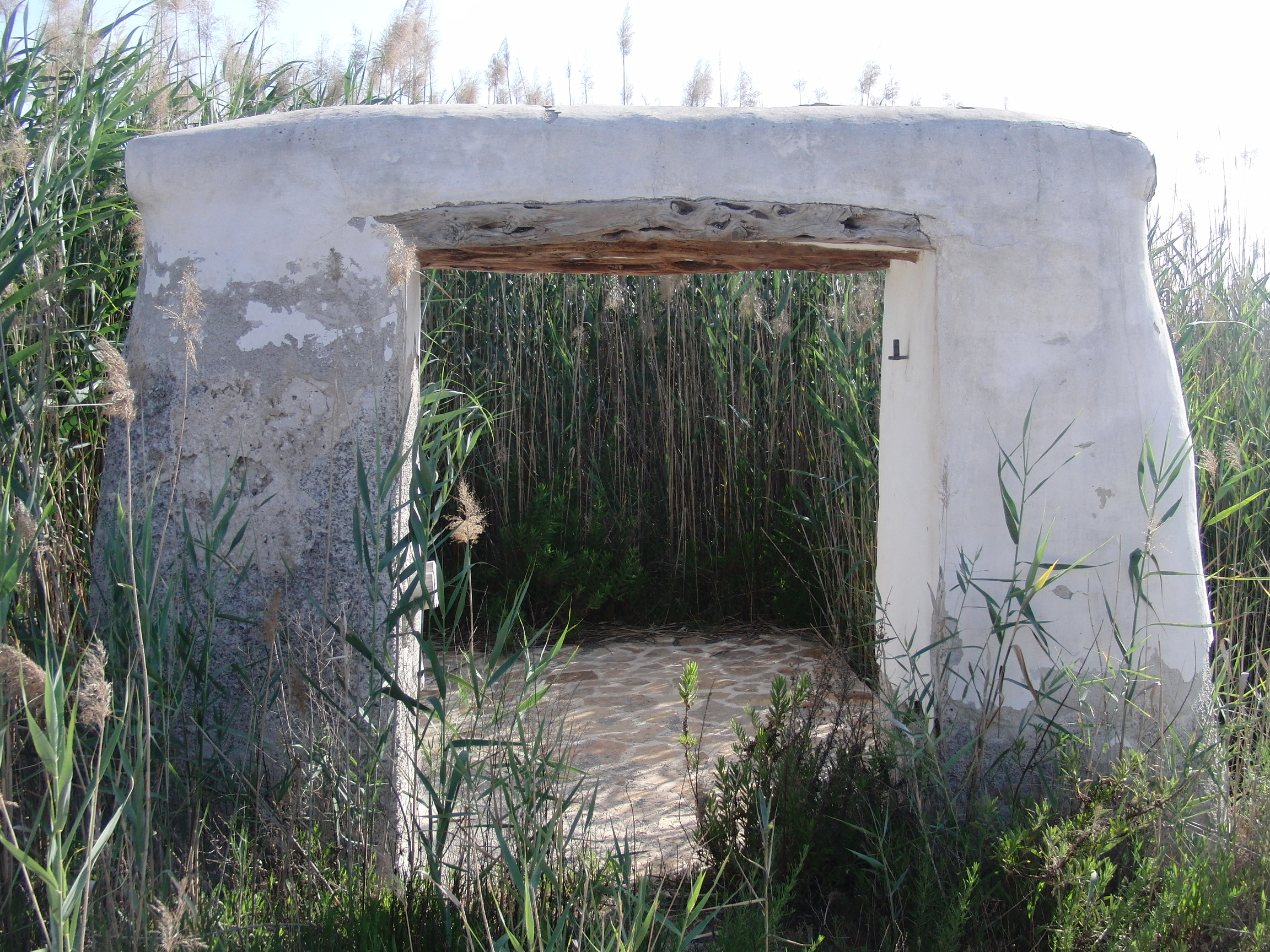
Old entry to a Feixa
