= Ibiza =

Spanish island in the Mediterranean Sea

Native name: Eivissa
- Flag of Ibiza

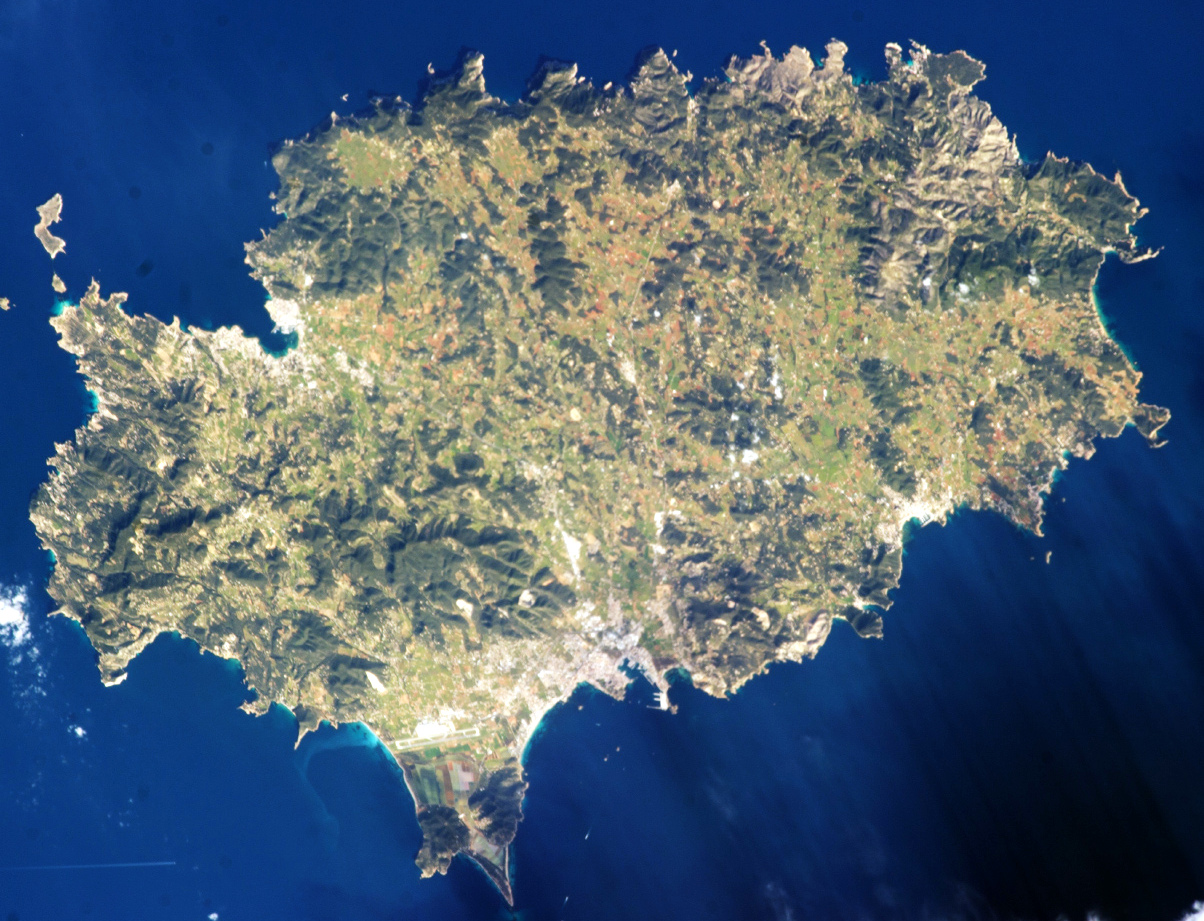
- Satellite view (2013)

- Location within Balearic Islands Location within Spain
- Interactive map of Ibiza

Geography
- Location: Balearic Sea
- Coordinates: 38.98°N 1.43°E
- Archipelago: Balearic Islands, Pityusic Islands
- Area: 571.6 km^{2} (220.7 sq mi)
- Highest elevation: 475 m (1558 ft)
- Highest point: Sa Talaiassa

Administration
- Spain
- Autonomous Community: Balearic Islands
- Province: Balearic Islands
- Capital city: Ibiza
- Largest settlement: Ibiza (pop. 51,872)
- Government: Island Council of Ibiza
- President: Vicente Marí (PP)

Demographics
- Population: 159,180 (1 January 2023)
- Pop. density: 278.0/km^{2} (720/sq mi)
- Languages: Catalan, Spanish

UNESCO World Heritage Site
- Official name: Ibiza, Biodiversity and Culture
- Type: Mixed
- Criteria: ii, iii, iv, ix, x
- Designated: 1999 (23rd session)
- Reference no.: 417
- Region: Southern Europe

Ibiza Insular Council Emblem

Ibiza (/ɪˈbiːzə/ (US) /aɪˈbiːθə/ (UK); Spanish: [iˈβiθa]; Catalan: Eivissa [əjˈvisə]; see below, or Iviza,) is a Spanish island in the Mediterranean Sea off the eastern coast of the Iberian Peninsula. It is 150 kilometres (93 miles) from the city of Valencia. It is the third largest of the Balearic Islands in area, but the second-largest by population. Its largest settlements are Ibiza Town (Catalan: Vila d'Eivissa, or simply Vila), Santa Eulària des Riu, and Sant Antoni de Portmany. Its highest point, called Sa Talaiassa (or Sa Talaia), is 475 metres (1,558 feet) above sea level.

Ibiza is well known for its nightlife and electronic dance music club scene in the summer, which attract large numbers of tourists. The island's government and the Spanish Tourist Office have worked toward promoting more family-oriented tourism.

Ibiza is a UNESCO World Heritage Site. Ibiza and the nearby island of Formentera to its south are called the Pine Islands, or "Pityuses".

== Names and pronunciation ==
In standard British English, the name is usually pronounced in an approximation of the Peninsular Spanish variant (/ɪˈbiːθə/ ib-EE-thə). In American English, the pronunciation is generally closer to the Latin American Spanish variant (/ɪˈbiːzə/ ib-EE-zə, /iːˈbiːsə/ ee-BEE-sə, and so forth), and the first syllable is sometimes pronounced as a homophone of "eye".

Phoenician colonists called the island Ibossim or Iboshim (cf. Hebrew: אִי־בּוֹשֵׂם, lit. 'Fragrance Island'), likely due to the abundance of aromatic plants on the island. Other speculation is (Phoenician: 𐤀𐤉𐤁𐤔𐤌, romanized: ʾYBŠM, lit. 'Dedicated to Bes'). It was later known to Romans as Ebusus.

The Greeks called the two islands of Ibiza and Formentera the Pityoûssai (Πιτυοῦσσαι, probably meaning "Pine-Covered Islands"). The Catalan name Pitiüses and the Spanish name Pitiusas retain this Greek root.

Its name in Catalan is Eivissa (pronounced [əjˈbisə]), but pronounced like ([əjˈvisə]) in Balearic, and ([ejˈvisa]) in Valencian. The Spanish name is Ibiza (pronounced [iˈβiθa] in Spain / [iˈβisa] in Latin America).

In the 18th and 19th centuries, the island was known to the British and especially to the Royal Navy as Iviça, possibly from an older Spanish orthography with ⟨ç⟩.

== History ==
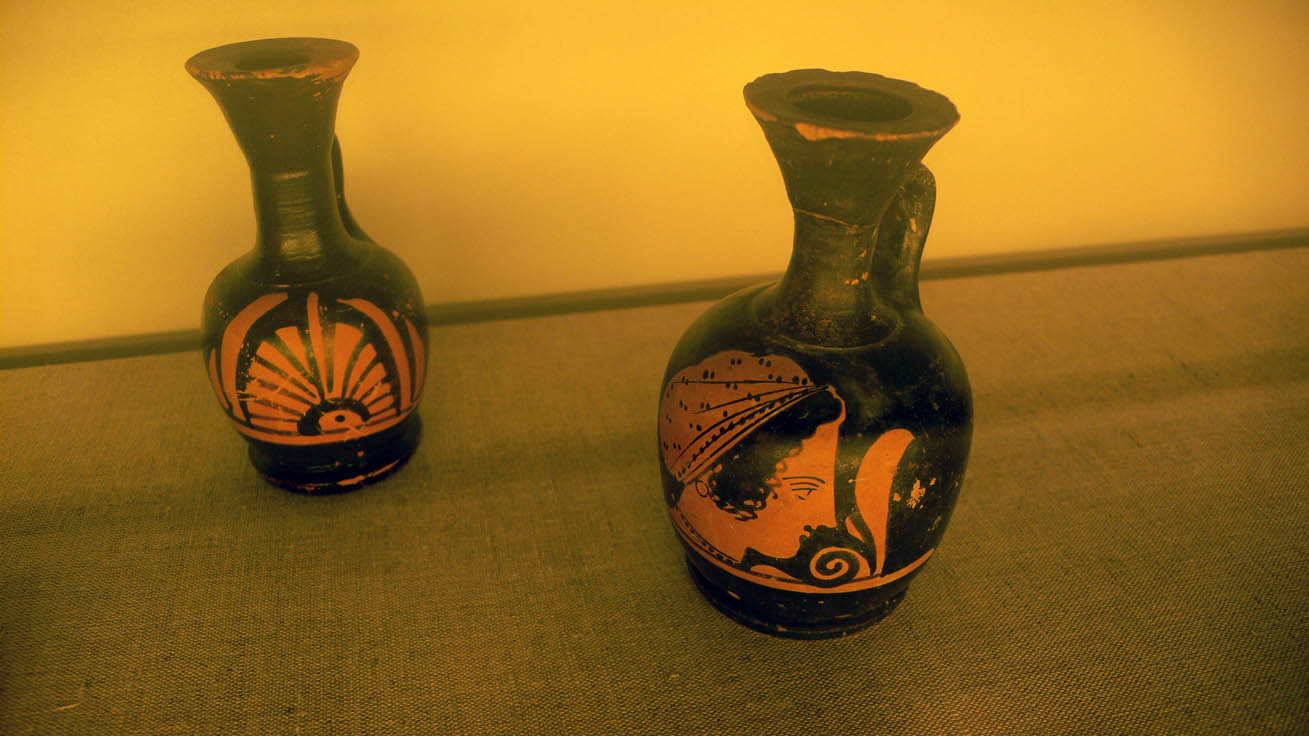
Ancient Greek aryballoi found in the necropolis of Puig des Molins. Museu de Puig des Molins, Ibiza

In 654 BC, Phoenician settlers founded a port on Ibiza. With the decline of Phoenicia after the Assyrian invasions, Ibiza came under the control of Carthage, also a former Phoenician colony. The island produced dye, salt, fish sauce (garum) and wool.

A shrine with offerings to the goddess Tanit was established in the cave at Es Cuieram, and the rest of the Balearic Islands entered Eivissa's commercial orbit after 400 BC. Ibiza was a major trading post along the Mediterranean routes. Ibiza began establishing its own trading stations along the nearby Balearic island of Mallorca (Majorca), such as Na Guardis, and Na Galera where numerous Balearic mercenaries were hired on, no doubt as slingers, (Note: "The Rhodians, like the Baleares, were celebrated slingers." (Latin: Iam cui Tlepolemus sator, et cui Lindus origo, Funda bella ferens Balearis et alite plumbo.)) to fight for Carthage.

During the Second Punic War, the island was assaulted by the two Scipio brothers (Publius and Gnaeus) in 217 BC but remained loyal to Carthage. With the Carthaginian military failing on the Iberian mainland, Ibiza was last used in 205 B.C. by the fleeing Carthaginian general Mago to gather supplies and men before his journey to Menorca and then to Liguria. Ibiza negotiated a favorable treaty (Foedus) with the Romans, which spared Ibiza from further destruction and allowed it to continue its Carthaginian-Punic institutions, traditions and even coinage well into the days of the Empire, when it became an official Roman municipality.

After the fall of the Western Roman Empire and a brief period of first Vandal and then Byzantine rule, the island was conquered by the Muslims in 902. The few remaining locals converted to Islam, and the island was colonized by Berbers. Under Islamic rule, Ibiza (Yabisah) came in close contact with the city of Dénia — the closest port in the nearby Iberian peninsula, located in the Valencian Community — and the two areas were administered jointly by the Taifa of Dénia for some time during the 11th century.

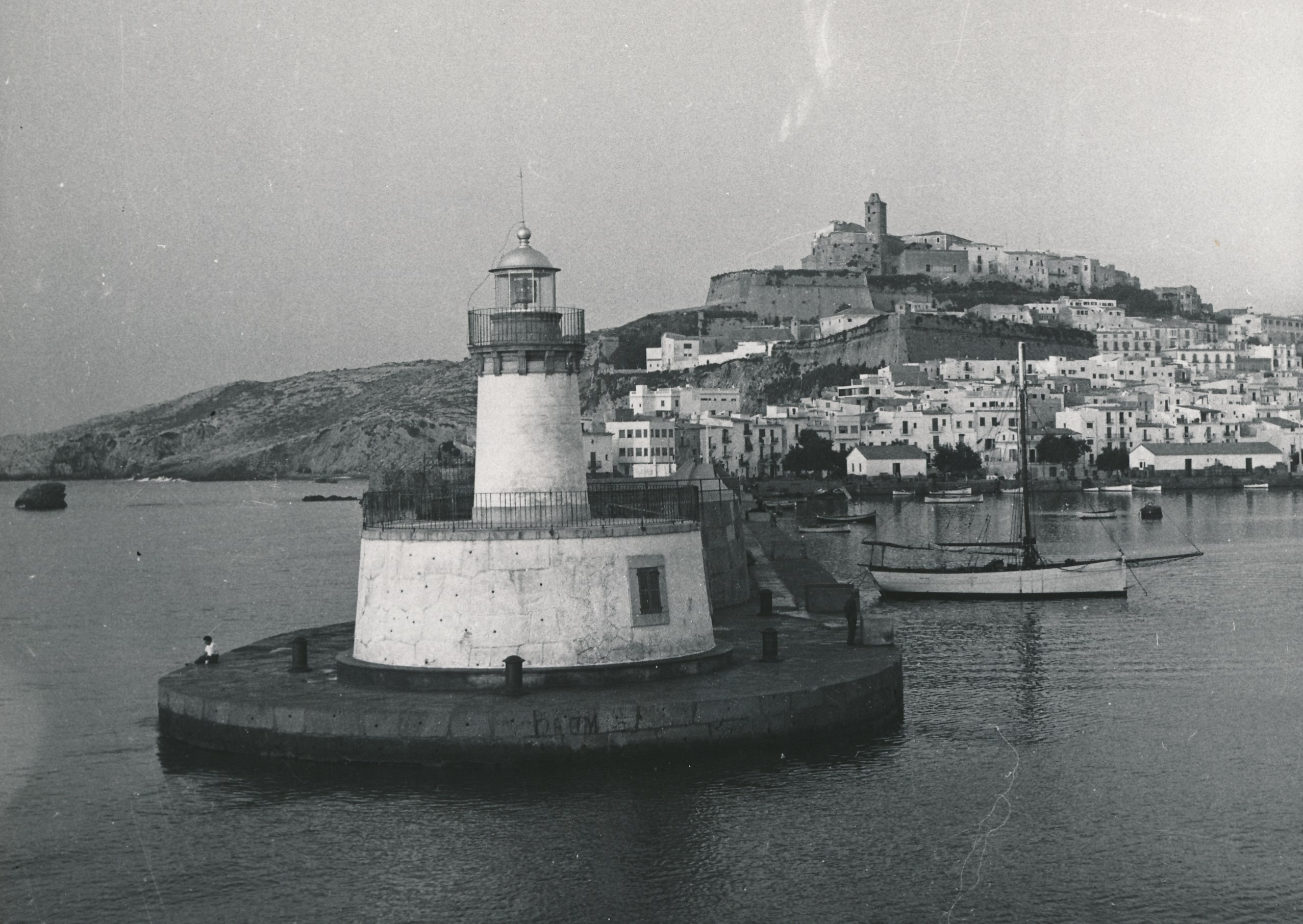
View of the Old Town in 1960

Ibiza, together with the islands of Formentera and Menorca, were invaded by the Norwegian King Sigurd I in the spring of 1110 on his crusade to Jerusalem. The king had previously conquered the cities of Sintra, Lisbon, and Alcácer do Sal and given them over to Christian rulers, in an effort to weaken the Muslim grip on the Iberian peninsula. King Sigurd continued to Sicily where he visited King Roger II of Sicily.

In September of 1159, Ibiza was sacked by the Norman fleet of the Kingdom of Sicily. The invaders looted the island, captured and enslaved the population, then left after being summoned by King William I of Sicily.

The island was conquered for the Crown of Aragon in 1235. The local Muslim population was deported, as was the case with neighboring Mallorca and elsewhere, and Christians arrived from Girona. The island maintained its own self-government in several forms until 1715, when King Philip V of Spain abolished the local government's autonomy. The arrival of democracy in the late 1970s led to the Statute of Autonomy of the Balearic Islands. Today, the island is part of the Balearic Autonomous Community, along with Mallorca, Menorca and Formentera.

=== Development ===
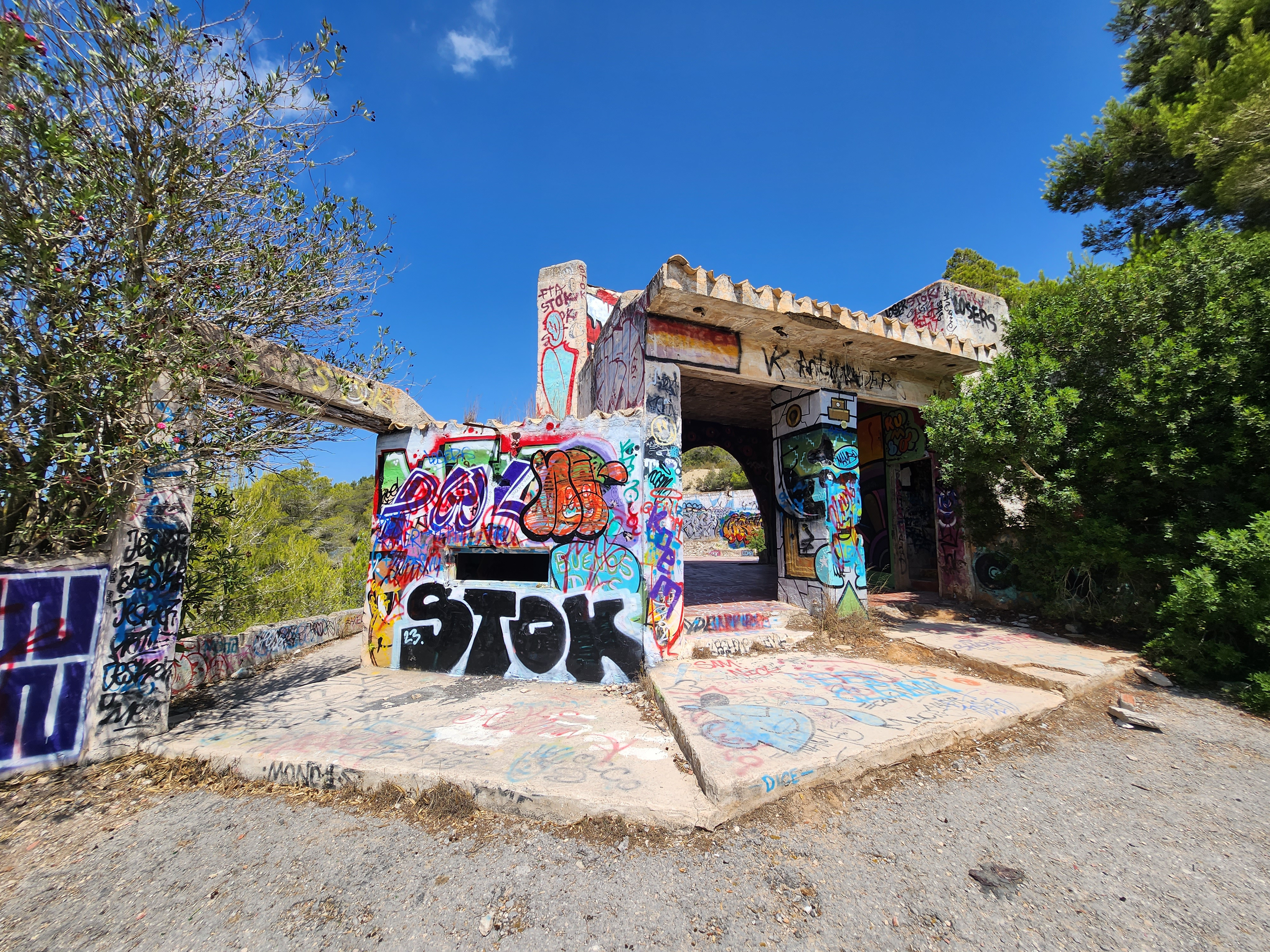
Abandoned Festival Club lies in the hills above San José

Since the early days of mass tourism on the island, there have been a large number of development projects ranging from successful ventures, such as the super clubs at Space and Privilege, to failed development projects, such as Josep Lluís Sert's abandoned hotel complex at Cala D'en Serra, the half-completed and now demolished Idea nightclub in Sant Antoni, and the ruins of a huge restaurant/nightclub in the hills near Sant Josep called Festival Club that only operated for three summer seasons in the early 1970s. The transient nature of club-oriented tourism is most obvious in these ruins scattered all over the island. Local artist Irene de Andrès has tackled the difficult issue of the impact of mass tourism on the island local landscapes, both natural and cultural, in an ongoing project called Where Nothing Occurs, in Spanish "donde nada ocurre".

In 2013, Ibiza property prices generally remained above market value, and many of the development projects on the island have now been completed or continue, as well as some new projects announced at the end of 2012. Since 2009, Ibiza has received an increase in the number of tourists every year, with nearly 6 million people travelling through Ibiza Airport in 2012. The summer season has become concentrated between June and September, focusing on the "clubbing calendar" which is currently booming. In recent years, the luxury market has dramatically improved, with new restaurants, clubs, and improvements to the marina in Ibiza Town.

Ibiza's increased popularity has led to problems with potable water shortages and overrun infrastructure. This has led to the imposition of a Sustainable Tourism Tax which went into effect on 1 July 2016. Minister of Tourism Vincente Torres stated in an interview in 2016 that the government has instituted a moratorium on building in certain areas. He said that with almost 100,000 legal tourist beds and about 132,000 inhabitants on the island's 572 square kilometres (221 sq mi), not much more tourism can be supported.

== Geography ==
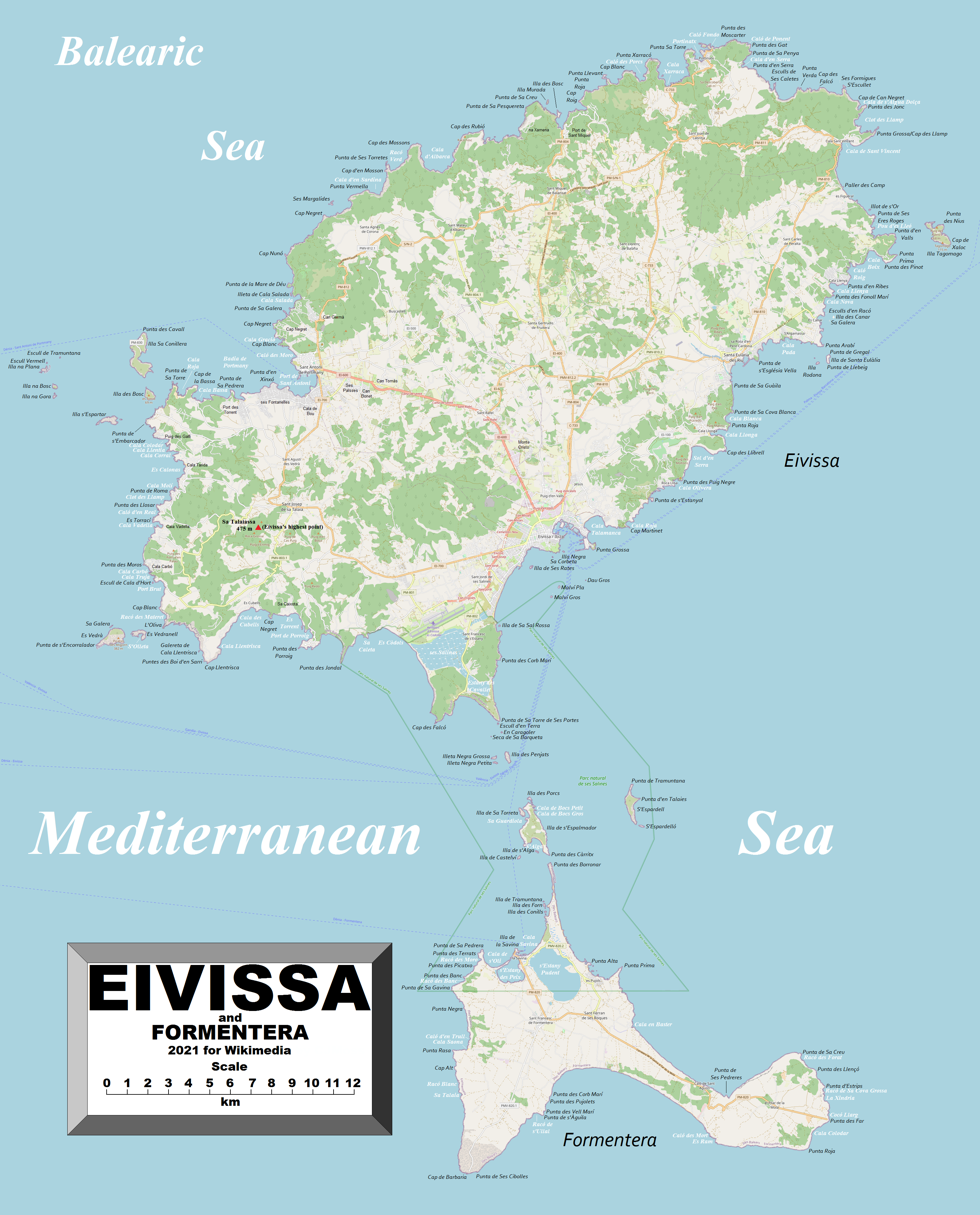
Enlargeable, detailed map of Eivissa and Formentera

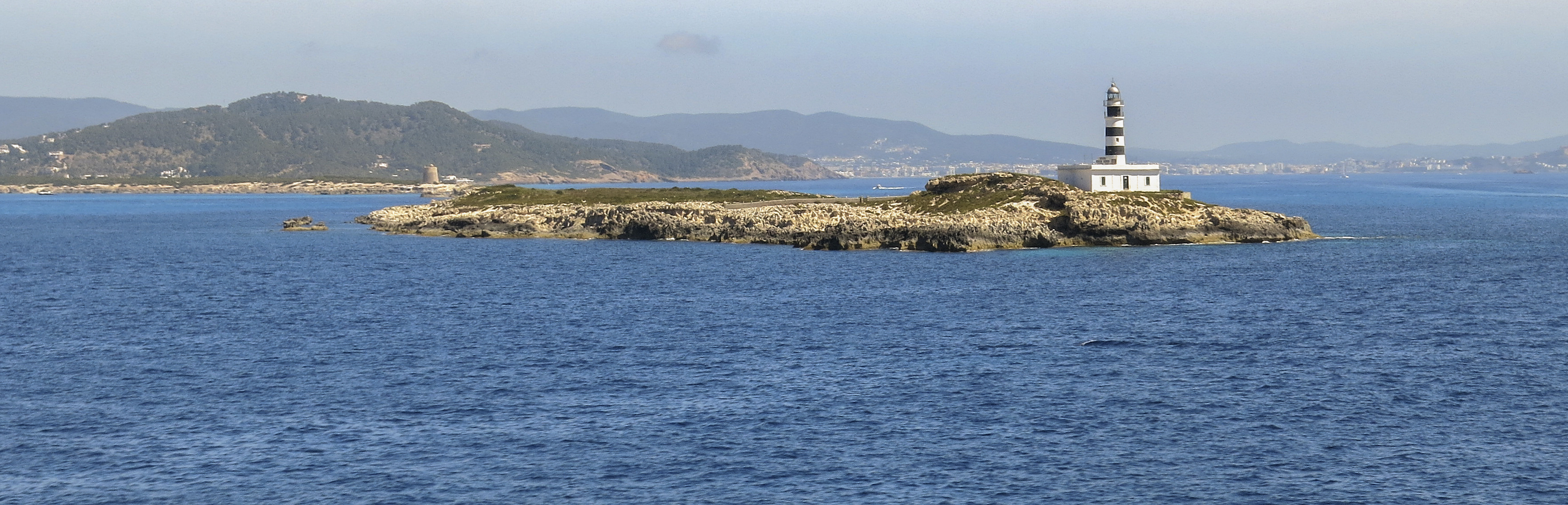
Penjats Island is the southernmost islet of Ibiza

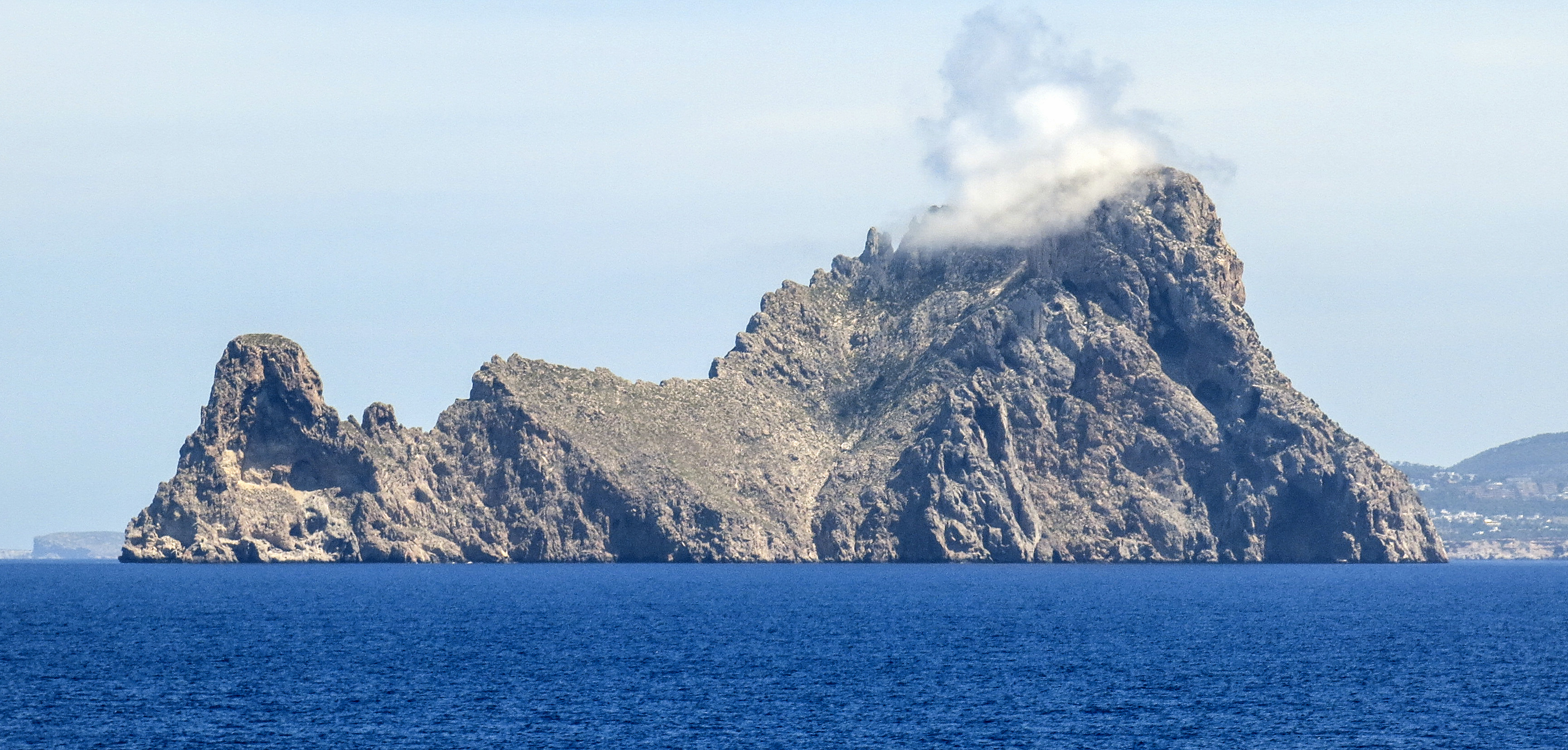
Es Vedrà (Sant Josep de sa Talaia)

Ibiza is a rock island covering an area of 572.56 square kilometres (221.07 sq mi), almost one-sixth the size of Mallorca, but over five times larger than Mykonos in the Greek Isles, or 10 times larger than Manhattan in New York City.

Ibiza is the larger of a group of the western Balearic archipelago called the Pityusic Islands (Pitiusas) or "Pine Islands" composed of itself and Formentera. The Balearic island chain includes over 50 islands, many of which are uninhabited. The highest point of the island is Sa Talaiassa, also known as Sa Talaia or Sa Talaia de Sant Josep at 475 metres (1,558 ft).

== Administration ==
Ibiza is administratively part of the autonomous community of the Balearic Islands, whose capital is Palma, on the island of Mallorca. Ibiza comprises five of the region's 67 municipalities:

Map	Municipality	Area in square km	Population 1 Nov 2011	Population 1 Jan 2021	Population 1 Jan 2023
	Sant Josep de sa Talaia (Spanish: San José)	159.4	24,079	29,015	30,340
	Sant Antoni de Portmany (San Antonio Abad)	126.8	21,915	27,582	28,551
	Sant Joan de Labritja (San Juan Bautista)	121.7	5,351	6,610	6,809
	Santa Eulària des Riu (Santa Eulalia del Río)	153.6	33,699	40,413	41,608
	Vila d'Eivissa (Ibiza)	11.1	48,550	50,566	51,872
	Totals	572.6	133,594	154,186	159,180

At the 2001 census these municipalities had a total population of 88,076 inhabitants, which had risen to an officially estimated total of 159,180 at the start of 2023, and have a land area of 572.56 km^{2} (221.07 sq mi).

The island's self-government institution is the Ibiza Island Council (Consell Insular d'Eivissa). Prior to its split in 2007, Formentera was part of the council.

=== Insular government ===
Elections are held every four years concurrently with local elections. From 1983 to 2007, councilors were indirectly elected from the results of the election to Parliament of the Balearic Islands for the constituencies of Ibiza and Formentera (then forming a single Island council, with Ibiza sending 12 councilors and Formentera a single one). Since 2007, however, separate direct elections are held to elect the Island Council of Ibiza, which has kept 13 as the number of seats (despite sending 12 to the Balearic Parliament).

==== Results of the elections to the former Island Council of Ibiza and Formentera ====
Island Councilors of the Island Council of Ibiza and Formentera between 1978 and 2007
Key to parties EVIB COP Pacte PSIB–PSOE FIEF CDS PDL UCD AIPF PP ICIF–CD CP AP–PL
Election	Distribution	President
1979	2 / 4 / 6	Cosme Vidal Juan (ICIF–CD, CP)
1983	5 / 1 / 6	Cosme Vidal Juan (ICIF–CD, CP)
1987	5 / 1 / 7	Antoni Marí (PP)
1991	5 / 1 / 7	Antoni Marí (PP)
1995	1 / 4 / 1 / 7	Antoni Marí (PP)
1999	1 / 6 / 6	Pilar Costa (Pacte Progressista)
2003	5 / 1 / 7	Pere Palau (PP)
Split into the Island Councils of Ibiza and Formentera respectively, with the 2007 Amendment of the Statue of Autonomy coming into effect.

==== Results of the elections to the Island Council of Ibiza ====
Island Councilors of the Island Council of Ibiza since 2007
Key to parties Podemos United We Can–EUIB PSOE–ExC PSOE–PxE PSIB–PSOE Cs PP Vox
Election	Distribution	President
2007	7 / 6	Xico Tarrés (PSOE–ExC)
2011	5 / 8	Vicent Serra (PP)
2015	3 / 4 / 6	Vicente Torres (PSIB–PSOE)
2019	2 / 4 / 1 / 6	Vicente Marí (PP)
2023	1 / 3 / 8 / 1	Vicente Marí (PP)

== Climate ==
Ibiza has a hot semi-arid climate (Köppen: BSh). The average annual temperature of Ibiza is 18.3 °C (65 °F), being warm and mild throughout the whole year. Ibiza lies at the same latitude as Atlantic City, yet it is much warmer for its location in the Mediterranean Basin. The climate of Ibiza is typically warm, sunny and dry, with low variation between highs and lows. The sunshine hours of Ibiza are 2700–2800 per year, while the yearly rain amount ranges from 400 to 450 millimetres (16 to 18 in). The average high temperature is 22.3 °C (72 °F), while the average low is 14.2 °C (58 °F). Winters are slightly rainy and mild, from November to April normally the whole island turns green for the seasonal rains. Summers are hot and fairly humid, which contributes to high dew points and muggy weather, increasing the heat index, although with very little rainfall. The few rainy days are often accompanied by thunderstorms.

During the coldest month, January, the average high temperature is 15.8 °C (60 °F), while the average low is 7.9 °C (46 °F). In the warmest month, August, the average high temperature is 30.4 °C (87 °F), while the low is 22.2 °C (72 °F). Extreme temperatures are rare for the influence of the sea. The average temperature of the sea in Ibiza is 19.7 °C (67 °F) and beach weather usually lasts 7 months, from May to November. The highest temperature ever recorded on Ibiza Airport is 41 °C (106 °F) on 13 August 2022.

Climate data for Eivissa Airport 6 metres (20 feet) (1991–2010), extremes (1953–present)
Month	Jan	Feb	Mar	Apr	May	Jun	Jul	Aug	Sep	Oct	Nov	Dec	Year
Record high °C (°F)	24.7 (76.5)	23.5 (74.3)	27.1 (80.8)	27.8 (82.0)	31.0 (87.8)	36.5 (97.7)	36.6 (97.9)	41.0 (105.8)	38.4 (101.1)	32.0 (89.6)	28.4 (83.1)	23.8 (74.8)	41.0 (105.8)
Mean daily maximum °C (°F)	15.8 (60.4)	16.0 (60.8)	17.8 (64.0)	20.0 (68.0)	23.1 (73.6)	27.1 (80.8)	29.8 (85.6)	30.4 (86.7)	27.7 (81.9)	24.0 (75.2)	19.5 (67.1)	16.8 (62.2)	22.3 (72.2)
Daily mean °C (°F)	11.9 (53.4)	12.0 (53.6)	13.7 (56.7)	15.8 (60.4)	18.9 (66.0)	22.8 (73.0)	25.7 (78.3)	26.4 (79.5)	23.7 (74.7)	20.2 (68.4)	15.7 (60.3)	12.9 (55.2)	18.3 (65.0)
Mean daily minimum °C (°F)	7.9 (46.2)	7.9 (46.2)	9.5 (49.1)	11.6 (52.9)	14.5 (58.1)	18.5 (65.3)	21.5 (70.7)	22.4 (72.3)	19.7 (67.5)	16.3 (61.3)	11.9 (53.4)	9.0 (48.2)	14.2 (57.6)
Record low °C (°F)	−1.2 (29.8)	−3.0 (26.6)	0.8 (33.4)	3.4 (38.1)	6.8 (44.2)	10.0 (50.0)	14.0 (57.2)	11.0 (51.8)	11.4 (52.5)	6.3 (43.3)	1.0 (33.8)	−0.4 (31.3)	−3.0 (26.6)
Average precipitation mm (inches)	40 (1.6)	30 (1.2)	22 (0.9)	27 (1.1)	22 (0.9)	8 (0.3)	3 (0.1)	18 (0.7)	63 (2.5)	57 (2.2)	60 (2.4)	52 (2.0)	402 (15.9)
Average precipitation days (≥ 1 mm)	5.0	4.4	3.5	4.0	2.6	1.2	0.3	1.7	4.4	5.8	5.9	5.5	44.3
Average snowy days	0.1	0.1	0.0	0.0	0.0	0.0	0.0	0.0	0.0	0.0	0.0	0.0	0.2
Average relative humidity (%)	75	73	72	70	68	66	67	69	70	74	73	76	71
Mean monthly sunshine hours	164	172	217	243	282	315	338	307	237	205	165	155	2,800
Source: Agencia Estatal de Meteorología

Climate data for Ibiza
Month	Jan	Feb	Mar	Apr	May	Jun	Jul	Aug	Sep	Oct	Nov	Dec	Year
No. of days with maximum temperature ≥ 30.0 °C (86.0 °F)	0	0	0	0	0	3.0	12.2	15.0	2.7	0.1	0	0	33.0
Mean number of days with no sunshine	0.1	0.2	0.1	0.4	0	0.2	0.1	0	0	0.1	0.1	0.2	1.5
Average sea temperature °C (°F)	14.7 (58.5)	14.3 (57.7)	14.5 (58.0)	16.3 (61.4)	19.1 (66.3)	22.5 (72.6)	25.1 (77.1)	26.2 (79.1)	25.2 (77.4)	22.7 (72.9)	19.6 (67.3)	16.6 (61.8)	19.7 (67.5)
Average Wind Speed m/sec (Kph)	3.9; 14	4.2; 15	4.3; 15	4.3; 15	4.0; 14	4.1; 15	3.9; 14	3.7; 13	3.6; 13	3.6; 13	4.0; 14	3.9; 14	4.0; 14
Mean daily daylight hours	9.8	10.8	12.0	13.2	14.3	14.9	14.6	13.6	12.4	11.2	10.1	9.5	12.2
Average ultraviolet index	2	3	5	6	8	9	9	8	6	4	3	2	5.4
Source #1:NOAA
Source #2: seatemperature.org
Source #3: Weather Atlas(daylight-uv)

== Demographics ==
Demographically, Ibiza displays a very peculiar configuration, as census agencies diverge on exact figures. According to the 2001 national census, Ibiza had 88,076 inhabitants (against 76,000 in 1991, 64,000 in 1981, 45,000 in 1971, and 38,000 in 1961). However, by the 2011 national census, this had grown to 133,594, and at the Census of 2021 had reached 154,186. This rapid growth stems from the amnesty which incorporated a number of unregistered foreign migrants.

In terms of origin, about 55 percent of island residents were born in Ibiza; 35 percent are domestic migrants from mainland Spain (mostly working-class families from Andalusia, and the remainder from Catalonia, Valencia and Castile); and the remaining 10 to 15 per cent are foreign, dual and multi-national citizens of the EU and abroad (Govern de les Illes Balears – IBAE 1996). In decreasing order, the most commonly visiting foreigners are German, British, Latin American, French, Italian and Dutch.

== Language ==
Eivissenc is the native dialect of Catalan that is spoken on Ibiza and nearby Formentera. Catalan shares co-official status with Spanish. Additionally, because of the influence of tourism and immigrants living in or maintaining residences on the island, other languages, such as English, French, German and Italian, are widely spoken.

== Sights ==
Though primarily known for its party scene, large portions of the island are registered as UNESCO World Heritage Sites.

A notable example includes the Renaissance walls of the old town of Ibiza City, which were awarded UNESCO World Heritage Status in 1999. They are one of the world's few Renaissance walls that were not demolished, and part of the medieval wall is still visible. There are some Ibizan cultural sites, such as the remains of the first Phoenician settlement at Sa Caleta. Other sites are still under threat from the developers, such as Ses Feixes Wetlands, but this site has now been recognised as a threatened environment, and it is expected that steps will be taken to preserve this wetland. The oceanic plant Posidonia oceanica is also part of UNESCO's World Heritage.

== Tourism ==
=== Nightlife ===
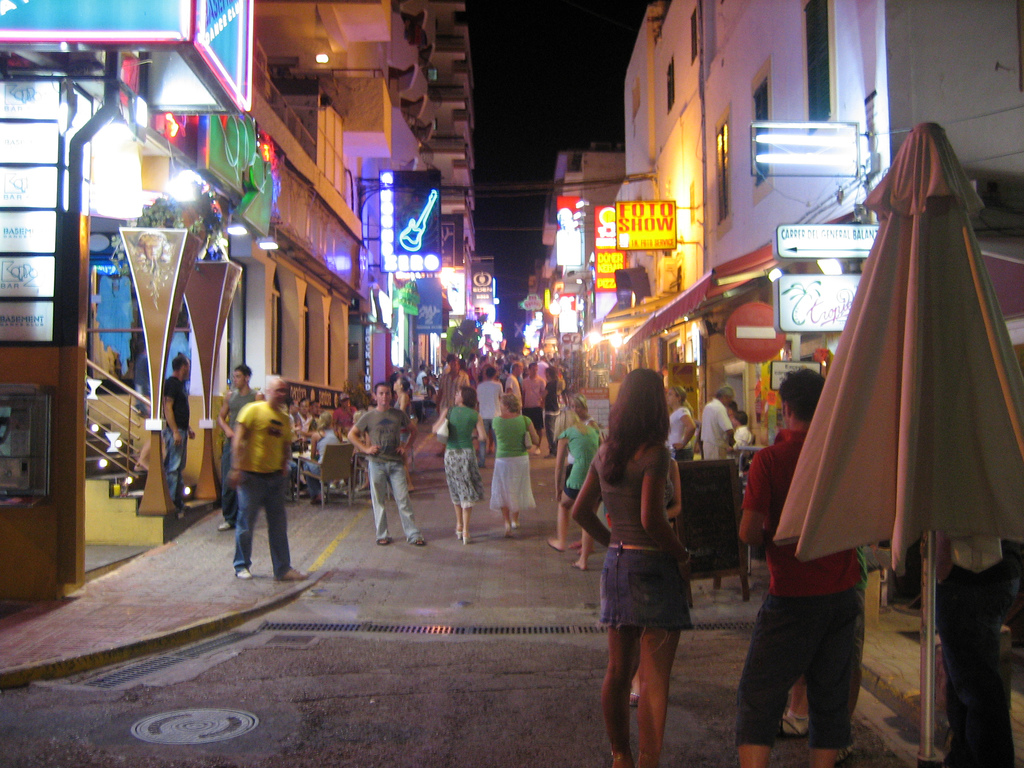
Sant Antoni, West End, seen here in 2006

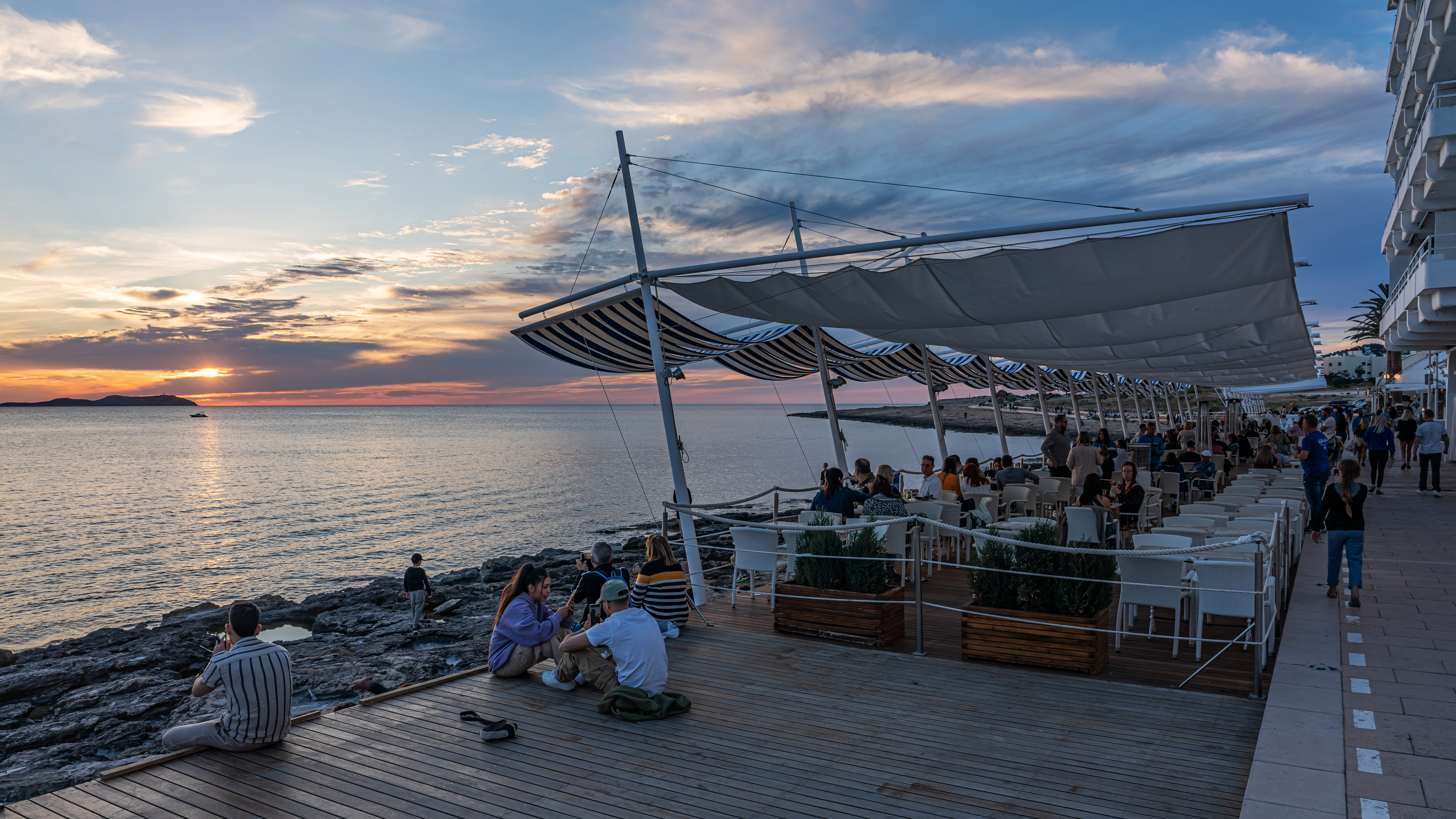
Sunset at Café del Mar, Sant Antoni de Portmany, seen here in 2023

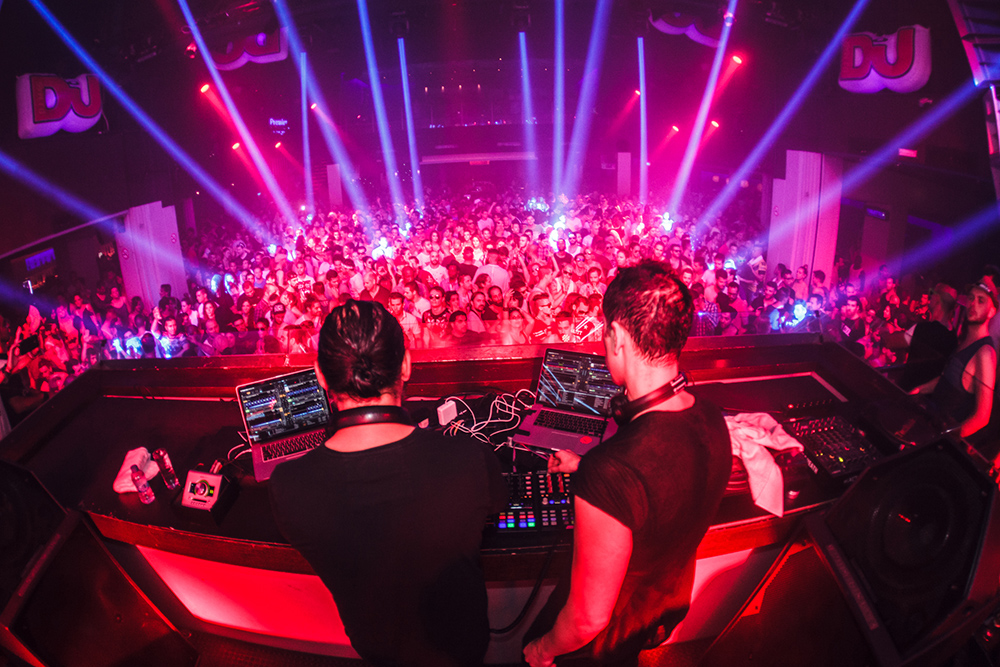
The nightclubs of Ibiza are internationally renowned, seen here at Space nightclub in 2015

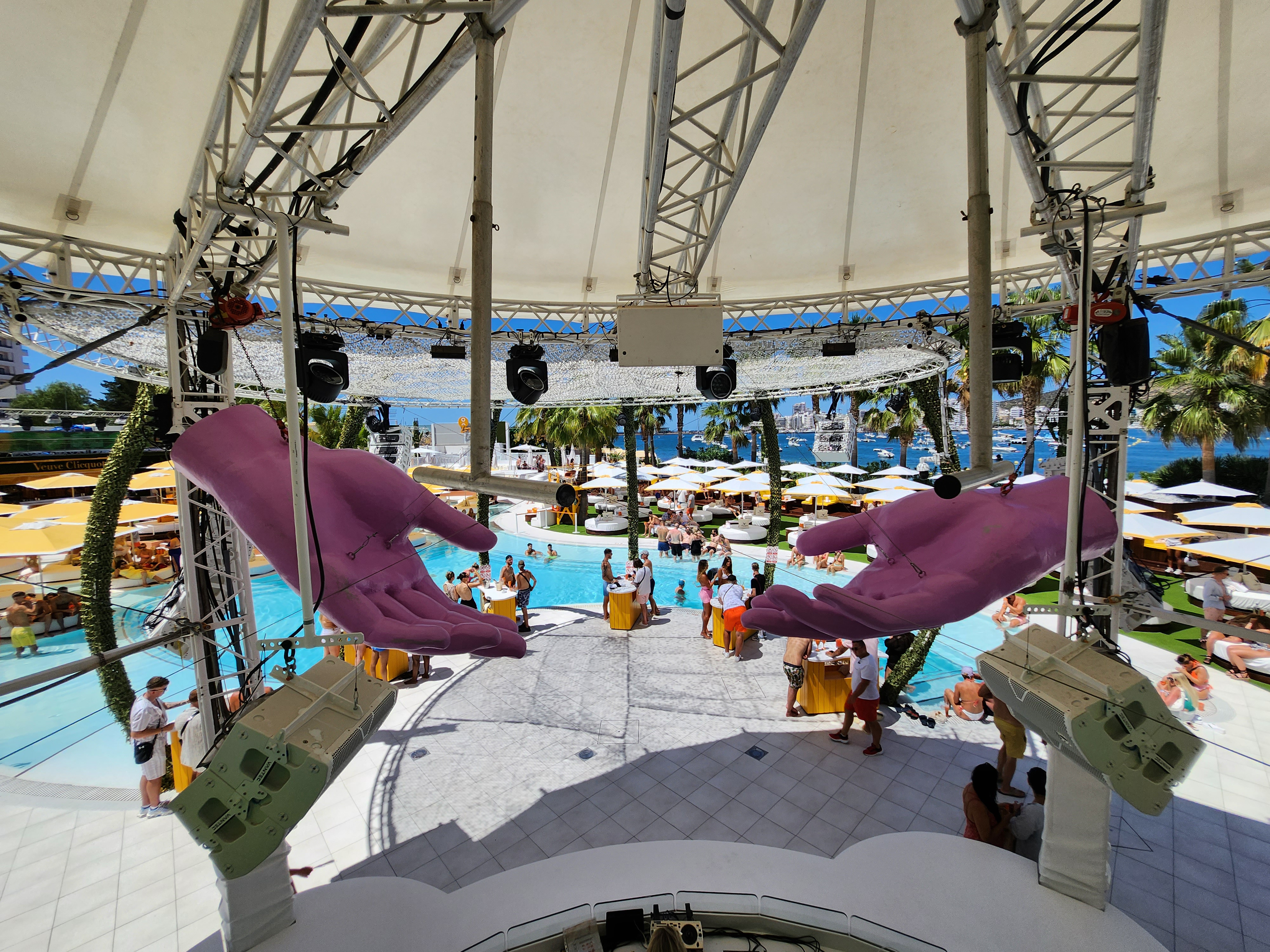
O Beach Ibiza is a popular day club for pool parties, seen here with headliner Andres Larin in 2023

Ibiza is considered to be a popular tourist destination, especially due to its well-known and at times riotous nightclub-based nightlife centred on two areas: Ibiza Town, the island's capital on the southern shore, and Sant Antoni to the west. Ibiza has garnered the reputation as the "Party Capital of the world".

Nightlife in Ibiza has undergone several changes since the island's opening to international tourism in the late 1950s. Origins of today's club culture may be traced back to hippie gatherings held during the 1960s and 1970s. During these, people of various nationalities sharing the hippie ethos would regroup, talk, play music and occasionally take recreational drugs. These would most often happen on beaches during the day, with nude bathing a common sight, and in rented country estates in the evenings or at nights. Apart from this confidential scene, which nevertheless attracted many foreigners to the island, local venues during the 1960s consisted mostly of bars, which would be the meeting points for Ibicencos, ex-pats, seafarers and tourists. The Estrella bar on the port and La Tierra in the old city of Eivissa were favourites.

During the 1970s, a decade that saw the emergence of the contemporary nightclub, several venues opened and made a lasting impact on Ibiza's nightlife. Three of these original clubs are still in operation today: Pacha, Amnesia and Es Paradís. These four clubs mainly defined nightlife on the White Island, which has evolved and developed from several distinctive elements: open-air parties (Es Paradis, Privilege, Amnesia), held in isolated places, eventually old fincas (Pacha, Amnesia), that mixed in nudity and costume party (Es Paradis, Privilege, Pacha) and enabled people from various backgrounds to blend (all). The hippie ethos served as a common factor that infused all these venues and catalyzed the experience of a certain kind of freedom, accentuated by the holiday nature of most of the stays on the White Island.

During the 1980s, the music played in these clubs gained in reputation and became known as Balearic beat, a precursor of the British acid house scene. As rave parties blossomed all over Europe, a DJ-driven club culture took hold of Ibizenca nightlife. It was at that time that Space opened, thanks to Pepe Rosello, which found a niche in the after-hour parties. The club would close at 18:00 and open again at 07:00, when all the other clubs were still closed, enabling party-goers to flock from the other clubs to Space and continue dancing in broad daylight.

At the end of the 1990s, the after-hour parties took firm root on the island. In 1999, the Circoloco parties made their debut at DC10, with some of the original elements of Ibiza nightlife at the forefront.

In recent years, during the summer, top producers and DJs in dance music come to the island and play at the various clubs, in between touring to other international destinations. Some of the most famous DJs run their own weekly nights around the island. Many of these DJs use Ibiza as an outlet for presenting new songs within the house, trance and techno genres of electronic dance music. The island has achieved fame as a cultural centre for house and trance in particular, with its name often being used as a partial metonym for the particular flavour of electronic music originating there, much like Goa in India.

Since 2005, the live music event Ibiza Rocks has changed perceptions of the Ibiza party landscape. Bands such as Arctic Monkeys, Kasabian, The Prodigy and the Kaiser Chiefs have played in the courtyard of the Ibiza Rocks Hotel.

The season now traditionally begins at the end of April, where Opening Parties take place at Ibiza's clubs over the course of a three-week period. Opening Parties normally coincide with the culmination of the International Music Summit, a three-day conference promoting the electronic music industry, featuring speakers, masterclasses and performances, and co-hosted by Pete Tong and Jaguar. IMS has taken place on the island annually since 2007 and holds its closing party at the top of Dalt Vila. The first clubs that host opening parties are normally Ushuaïa, Hï, Amnesia, and Pacha. The first parties take place at the end of April, starting with the Hï and Ushuaïa Opening Parties, and the last parties occur around mid-October, usually being the Amnesia and Pacha Closing Parties.

Ibiza has recently won numerous awards globally for its world class nightlife venues. Hï Ibiza has won the best club in the DJ Mag Top 100 Club awards for four consecutive years in 2022, 2023, 2024, and 2025. The island's newest superclub, UNVRS, won best club in the world at the 2025 Golden Moon Awards.

=== Other ===
The island's government is in the process of making policy changes to encourage a more family-friendly and quieter tourism scene. These include rules such as the closing of all nightclubs by 06:00 at the latest and requiring all new hotels to be 5-star. The administration wants to attract a more international mixture of tourists.

The island's tourism is not always characterized by its nightlife. Visitors can take a hot-air balloon ride, surf, visit the Cave Can Mark, or go to Cap Blanc's Aquarium.

== Transport ==
Map of roads and Ibiza Airport (on southern point) and water routes (click map to enlarge).

Ibiza has its own airport, which has many international flights during the summer tourist season, especially from the European Union and the United Kingdom.

There are also ferries from the harbour of Sant Antoni and Ibiza Town to Barcelona, Mallorca, Dénia, and Valencia. There are also ferries to Formentera leaving Sant Antoni Harbour (normally every Wednesday), and daily from Ibiza Town, Santa Eulària, and Figueretes–Platja d'en Bossa.

Several public buses also travel between Sant Antoni and Ibiza Town, every 15 minutes in summer and every half-hour in winter. In addition, there are buses from Sant Antoni to Cala Bassa, Cala Conta and Cala Tarida, and to the airport. From Ibiza there are buses to the Platja d'en Bossa, Ses Salines, the airport and Santa Eulària. The late night bus line that stops at the various clubs is locally known as the Disco Bus.

== In popular culture ==
A number of novels and other books have been written using Ibiza as the setting, including: The Life Impossible by Matt Haig, The Canticle of Ibiza by Justin Kurian, The White Island by Stephen Armstrong, Joshua Then and Now by Mordecai Richler, Soma Blues by Robert Sheckley, Vacation in Ibiza by Lawrence Schimel, A Short Life on a Sunny Isle: An Alphonse Dantan Mystery by Hannah Blank, They Are Ruining Ibiza by A. C. Greene, and The Python Project by Victor Canning. Books including Ibiza Bohemia, which was published by Assouline, have explored the island itself with both photography and text, while other such as Memes Eivissencs have registered the traditions of their residents and their history in social media.

The eleventh track of J Cole’s Might Delete Later is "Trae the Truth in Ibiza", which makes mention of being "in the trenches" whilst also being on a luxurious holiday in Ibiza. The third track on Prefab Sprout's 1990 album Jordan: The Comeback is "Machine Gun Ibiza". It is also mentioned in David Bowie's 1971 track "Life on Mars?": "See the mice in their million hordes, from Ibiza to the Norfolk Broads."

In Monty Python's Flying Circus, the opening sketch of Episode 33 features the pilot Biggles. His secretary teasingly calls him "Señor Biggles", and Biggles protests, saying, "I've never even been to Spain." The secretary responds, "You went to Ibiza last year." Biggles counters, "That's still not grounds for calling me señor, or Don Beeg-les for that matter." The 2000 UK comedy film Kevin and Perry Go Large is set in Ibiza with the two main teenage character trying to become DJs. Wham's 1983 hit single "Club Tropicana" music video was filmed in Ibiza. It was the first time George Michael and Andrew Ridgeley left the UK. Vengaboys' 1999 single "We're Going to Ibiza" reached number one on the singles chart in United Kingdom and the Netherlands. The song saw a resurgence in Austria in 2019 due to the Ibiza affair. The island is shown as the home of notorious art forger Elmyr de Hory in the 1973 docudrama F for Fake by Orson Welles. The fourth track off of The Prodigy's sixth studio album The Day Is My Enemy is titled "Ibiza". The song has fast rapping and electronic beats. The rapping is performed by the band’s frontman Keith Flint (died 2019).

In popular music, American singer-songwriter Mike Posner released "I Took a Pill in Ibiza" (alternatively known as "In Ibiza", or its clean title "I Took a Plane to Ibiza") in April 2015, as a single on his Vevo account and in the exclusive The Truth EP; it was later released on At Night, Alone in May 2016. Originally an acoustic guitar-based folk pop song, it was remixed by the Norwegian duo SeeB as a tropical house dance pop song, and released digitally as a single in the United States on 24 July 2015. "I Took a Pill in Ibiza" peaked at #4 on the Billboard Hot 100 in the U.S., and reached #1 on seventeen other charts. Tourism officials in Ibiza were reportedly "annoyed" by the song's apparent reinforcement of drug culture associated with Ibiza's past, and Tourism Director Vicent Ferrer subsequently invited Posner to experience the island's culture and how it contrasts with the party "typecast".

== Notable people ==
The Spanish composer and music theorist Miguel Roig-Francolí was born in Ibiza, as was the politician and Spain's former Minister of Foreign Affairs, Abel Matutes.

Notable former residents of Ibiza include Desmond Tarrant (author and poet) and his daughter Amanda Tarrant (journalist), who was born in Ibiza, Spandau Ballet's Steve Norman, English punk musician Sid Vicious, comic actor Terry-Thomas, Hungarian master forger Elmyr de Hory, American authors Cormac McCarthy and Clifford Irving. English actor Denholm Elliott retired and died aged 70 at his home in Santa Eulària des Riu, Ibiza, on 6 October 1992.

Spanish pop band Locomia has its roots in Ibiza.

== Gallery ==
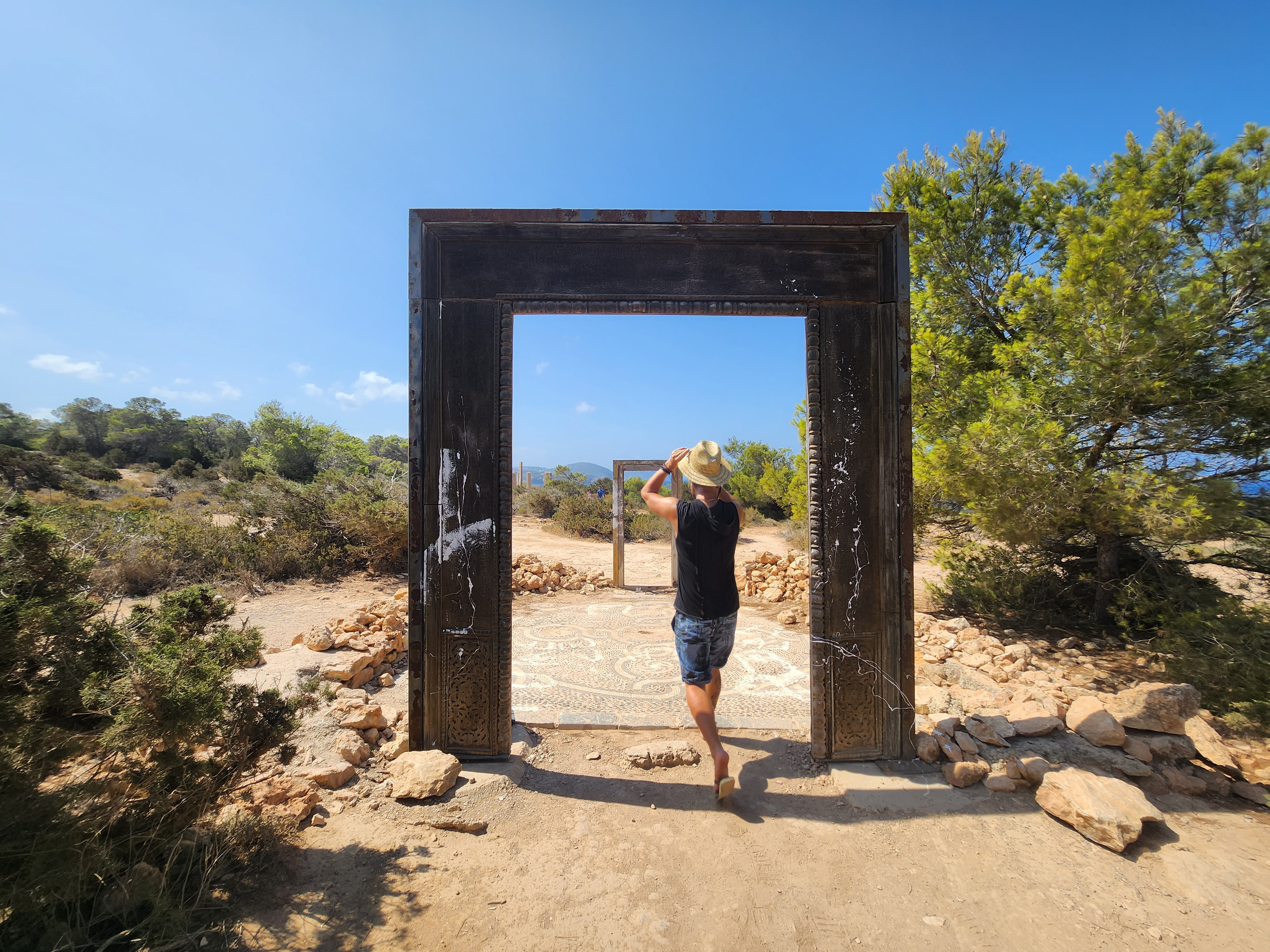
Las Puertas de Can Soleil

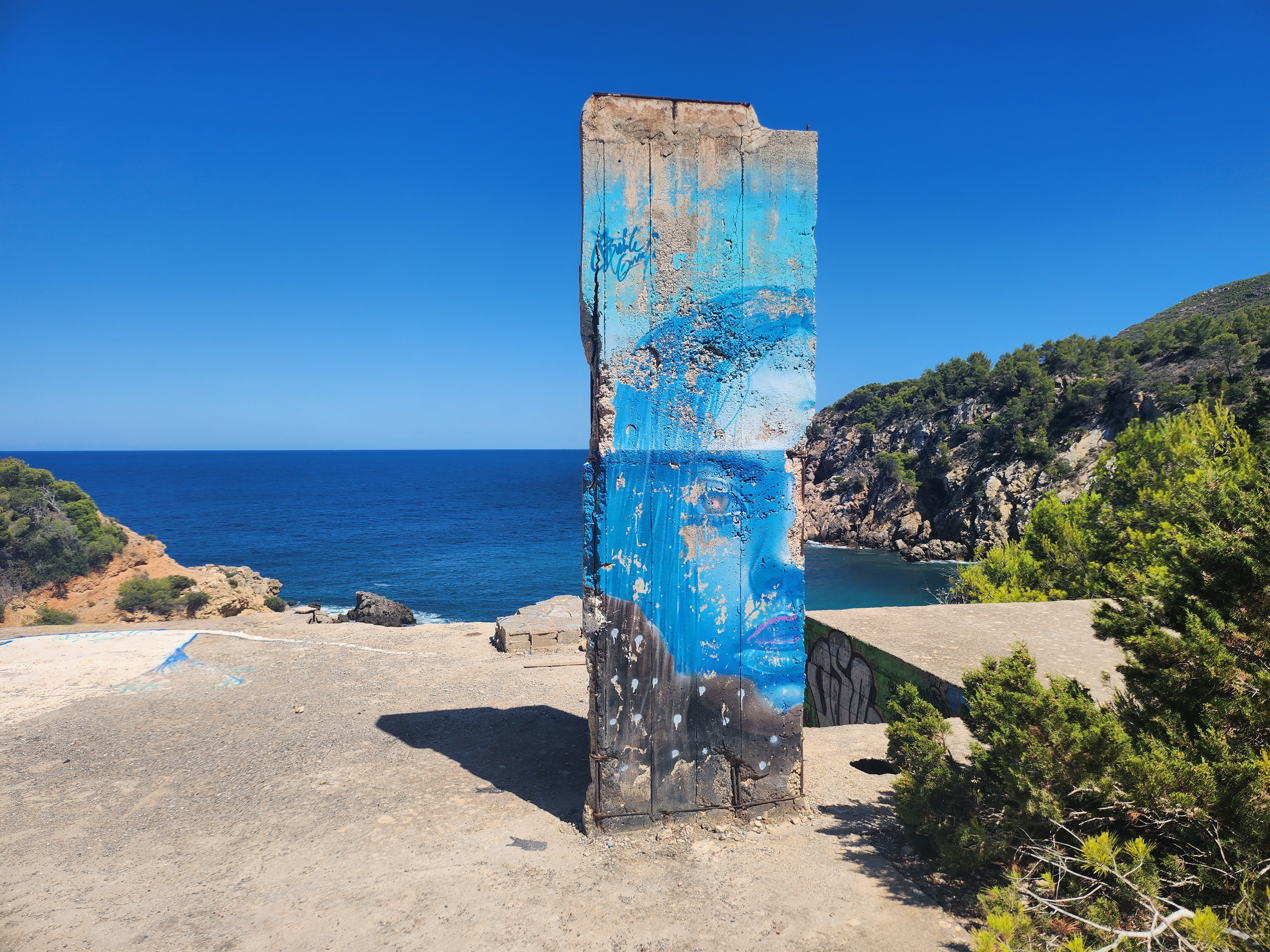
Cala d'en Serra

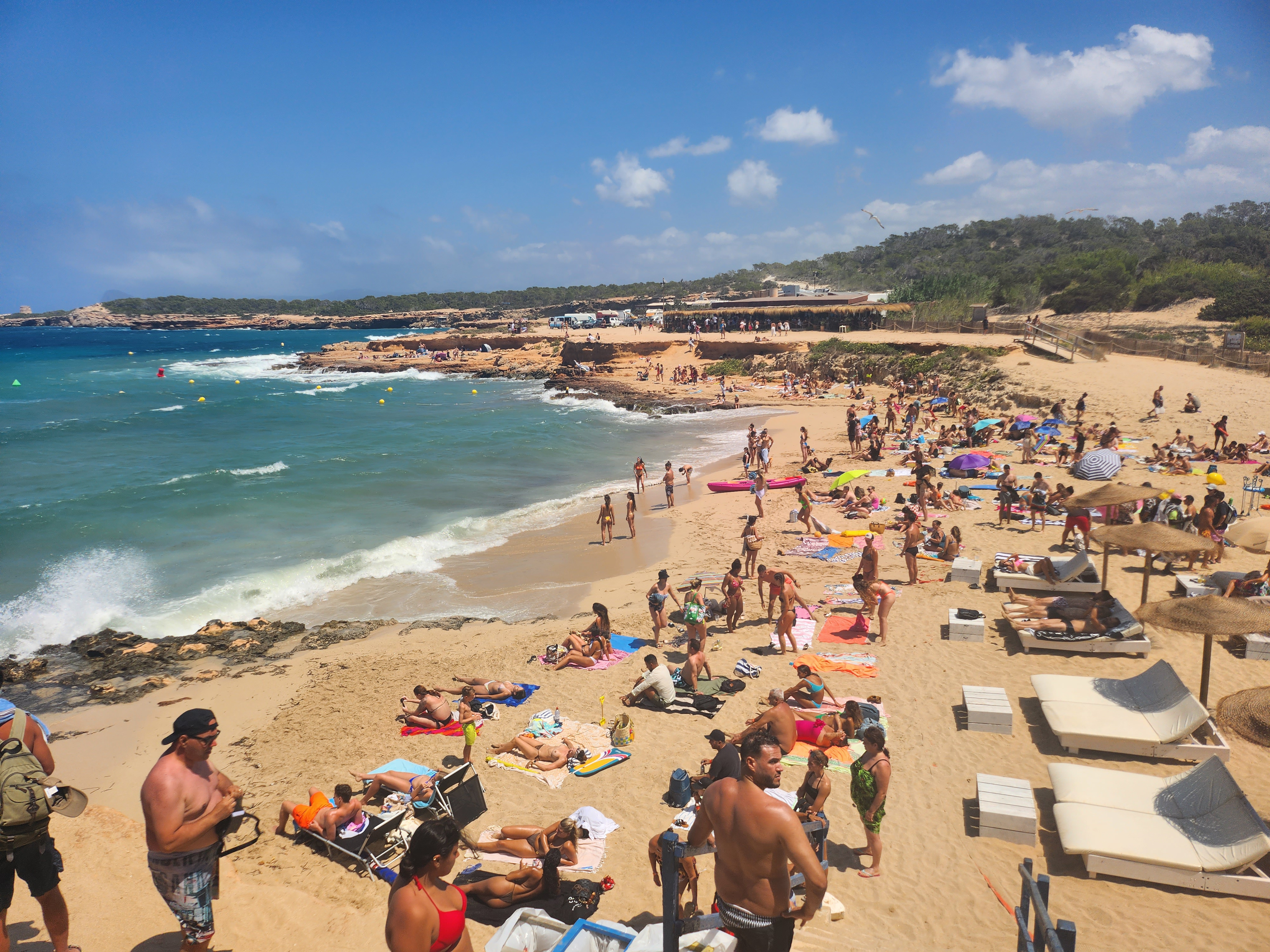
Platges de Comte

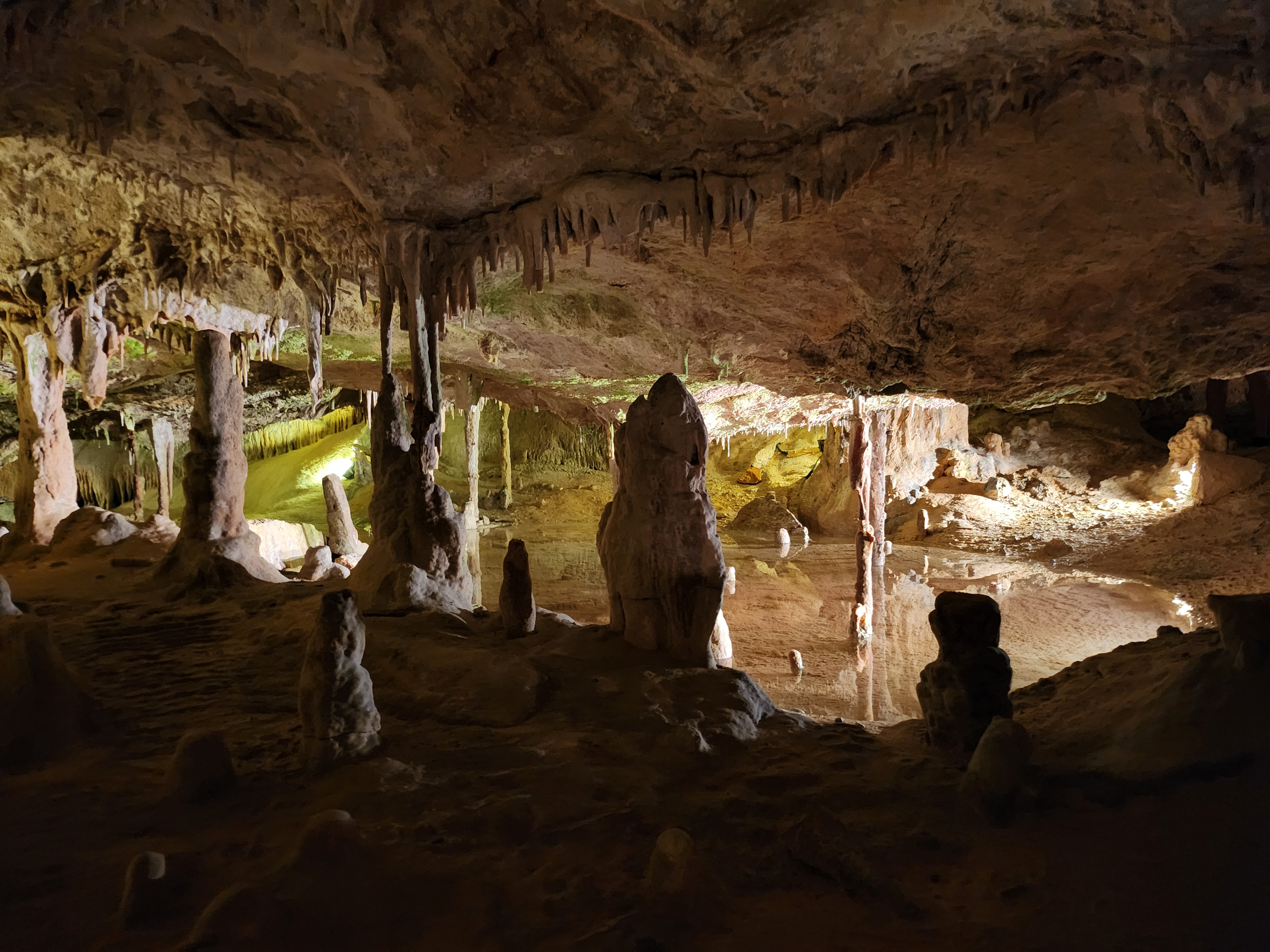
Cova de Can Marçà

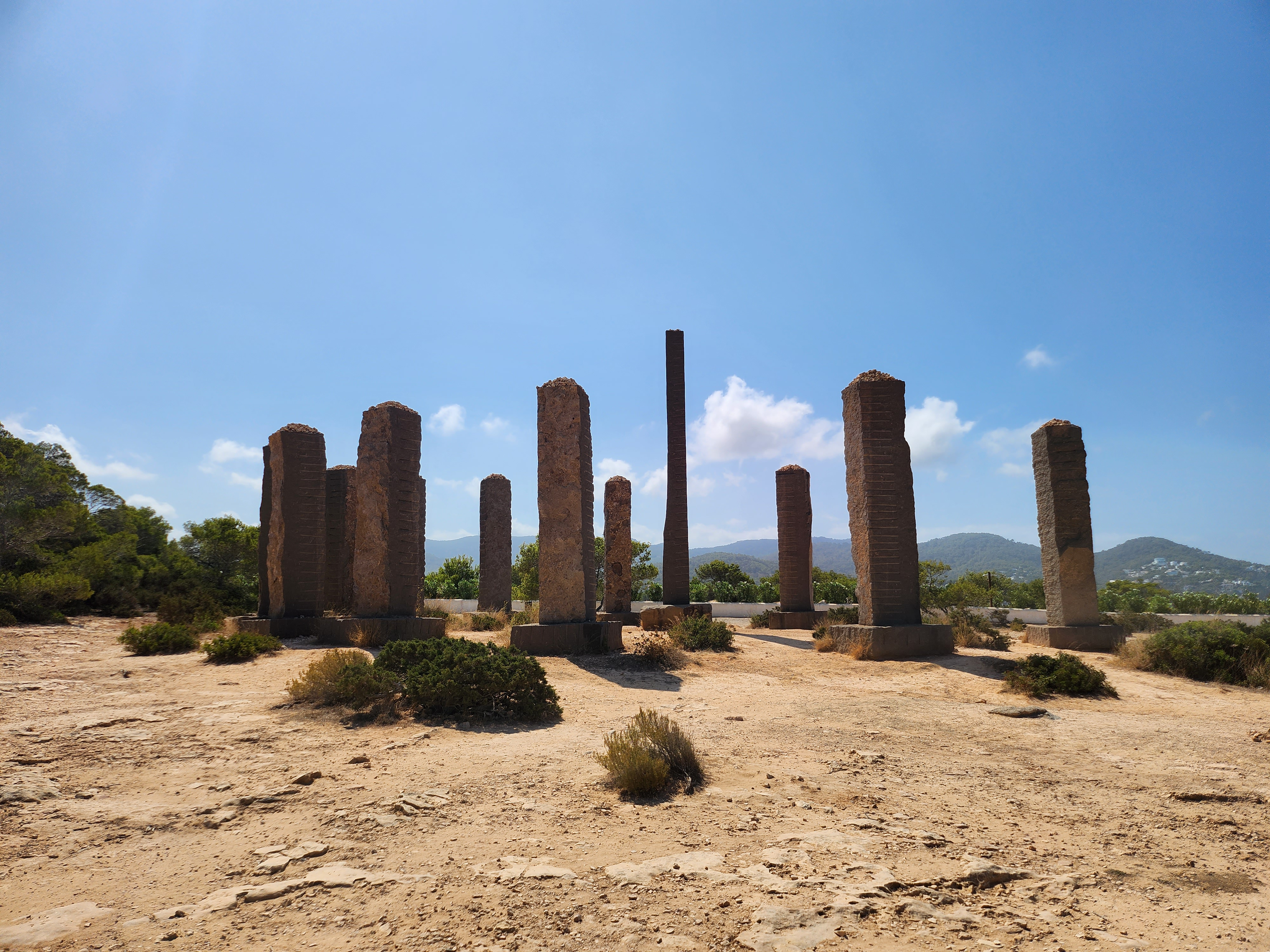
Time and Space sculpture

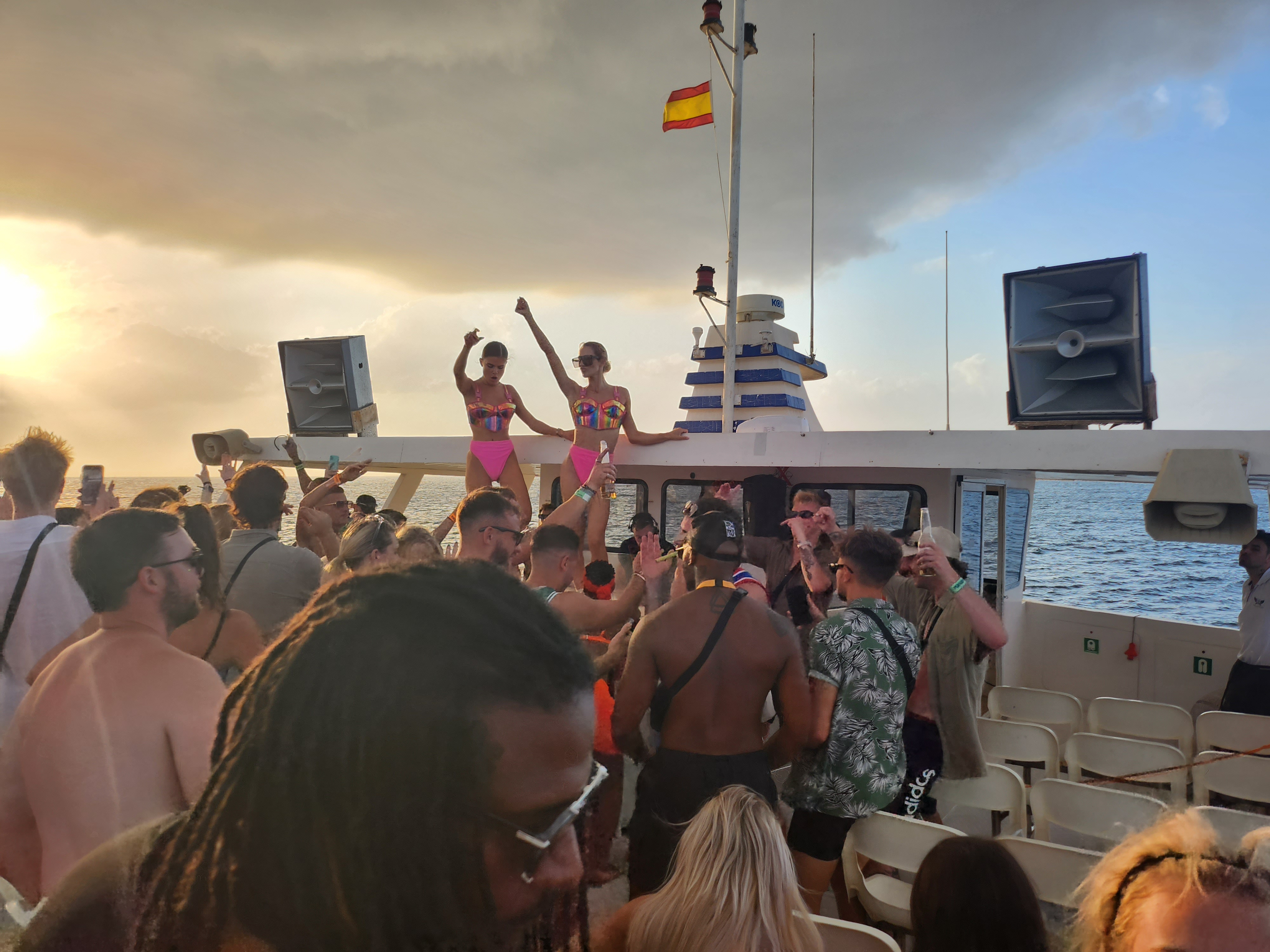
Pukka Up boat party

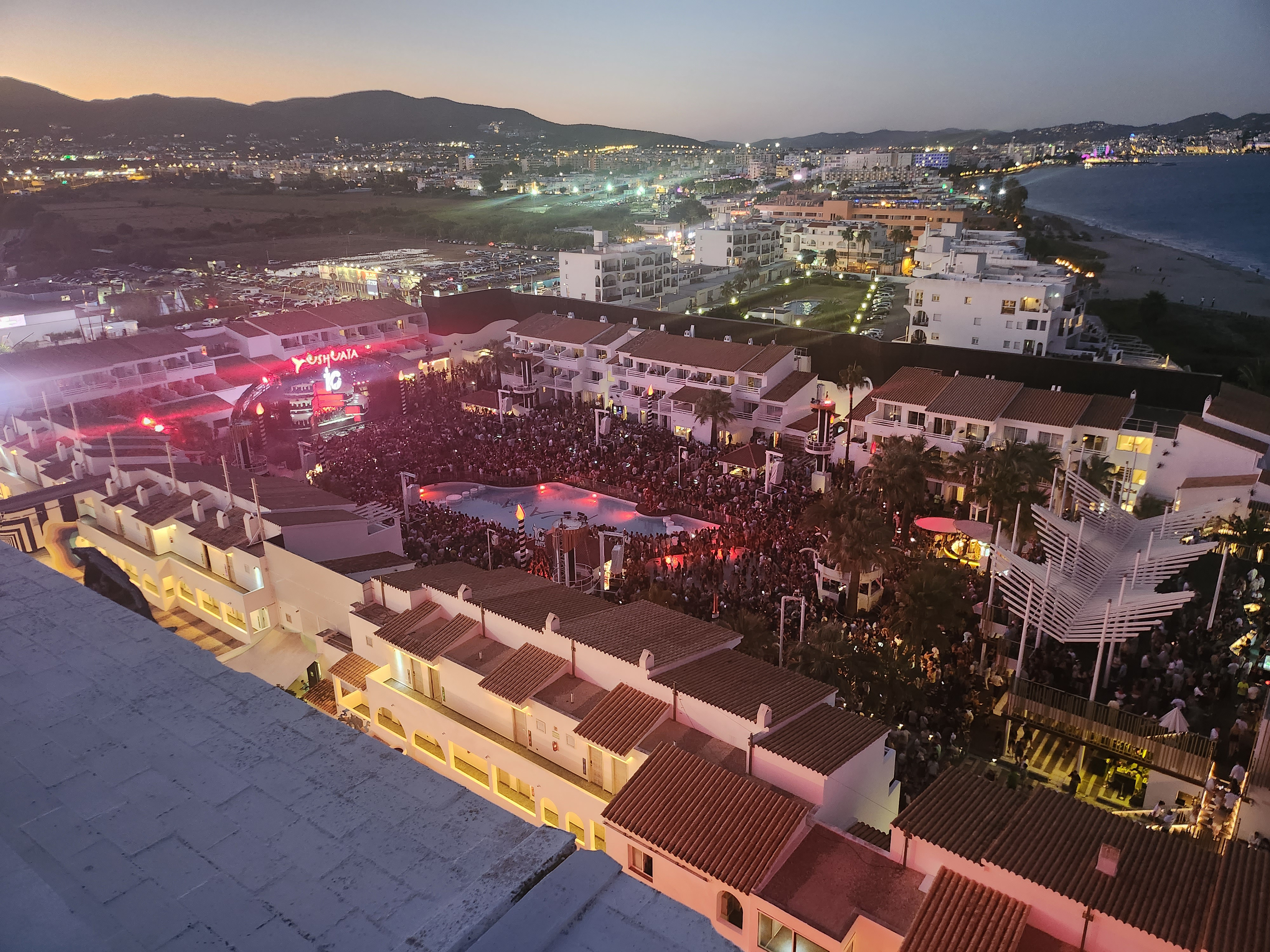
Ushuaïa Ibiza

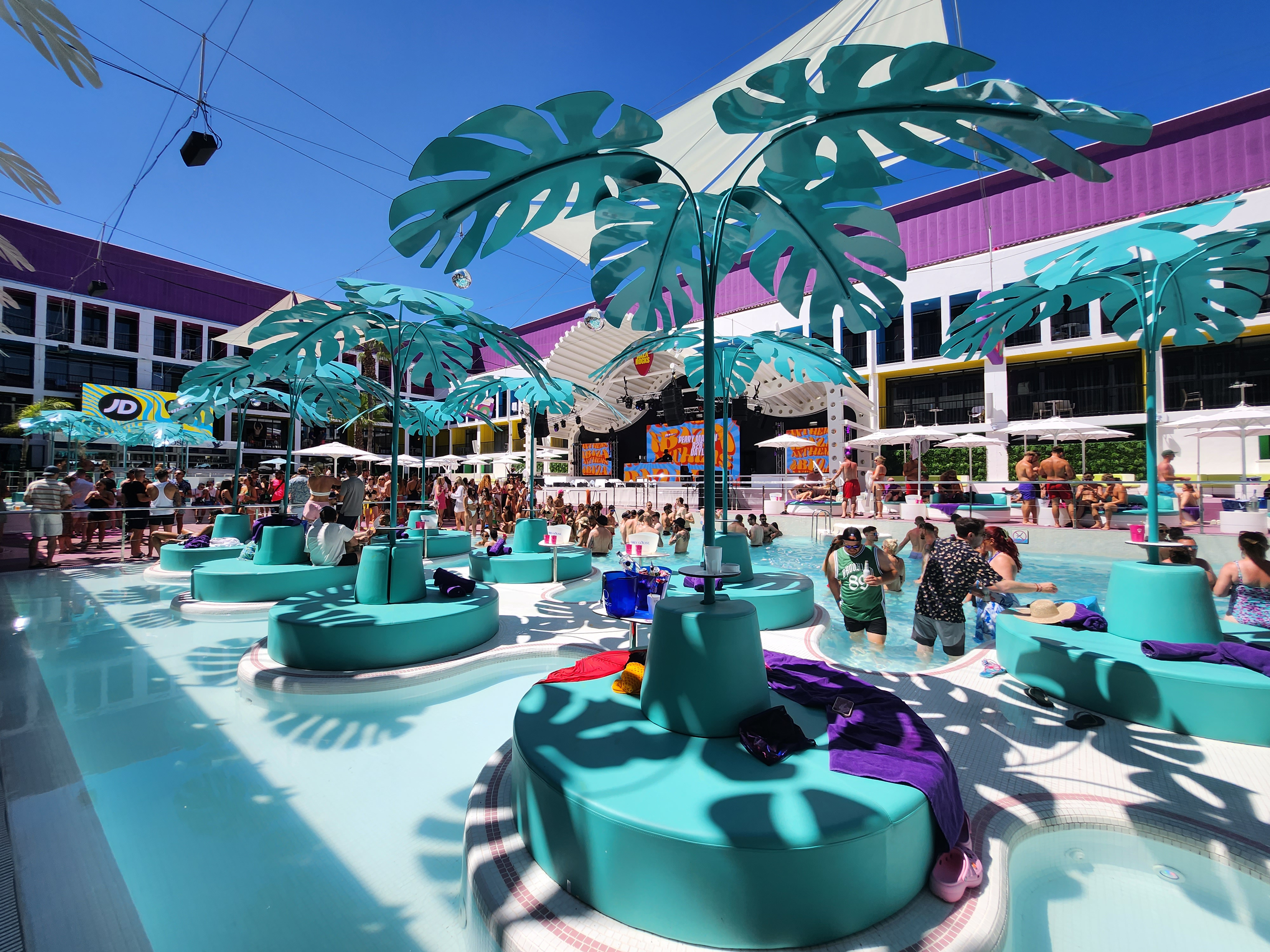
Ibiza Rocks day club
