= Sa Talaiassa =

Mountain on Ibiza, Spain

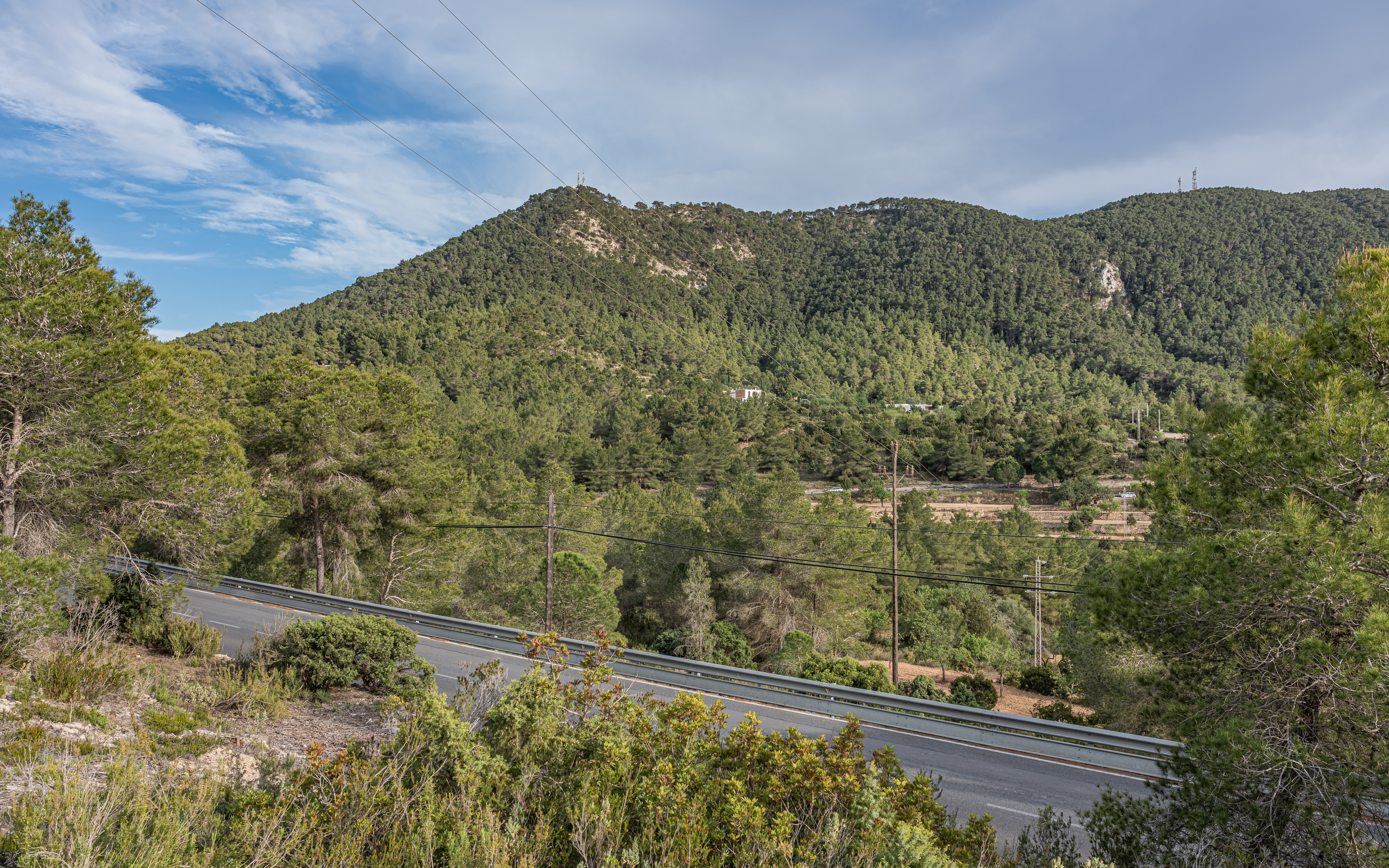
- Sa Talaiassa summit

Highest point
- Elevation: 475 m (1,558 ft)
- Coordinates: 38°54′41″N 1°16′27″E

Geography
- Location: Ibiza (Balearic Islands)

Climbing
- First ascent: Unknown
- Easiest route: Drive from Sant Josep de sa Talaia, then hike

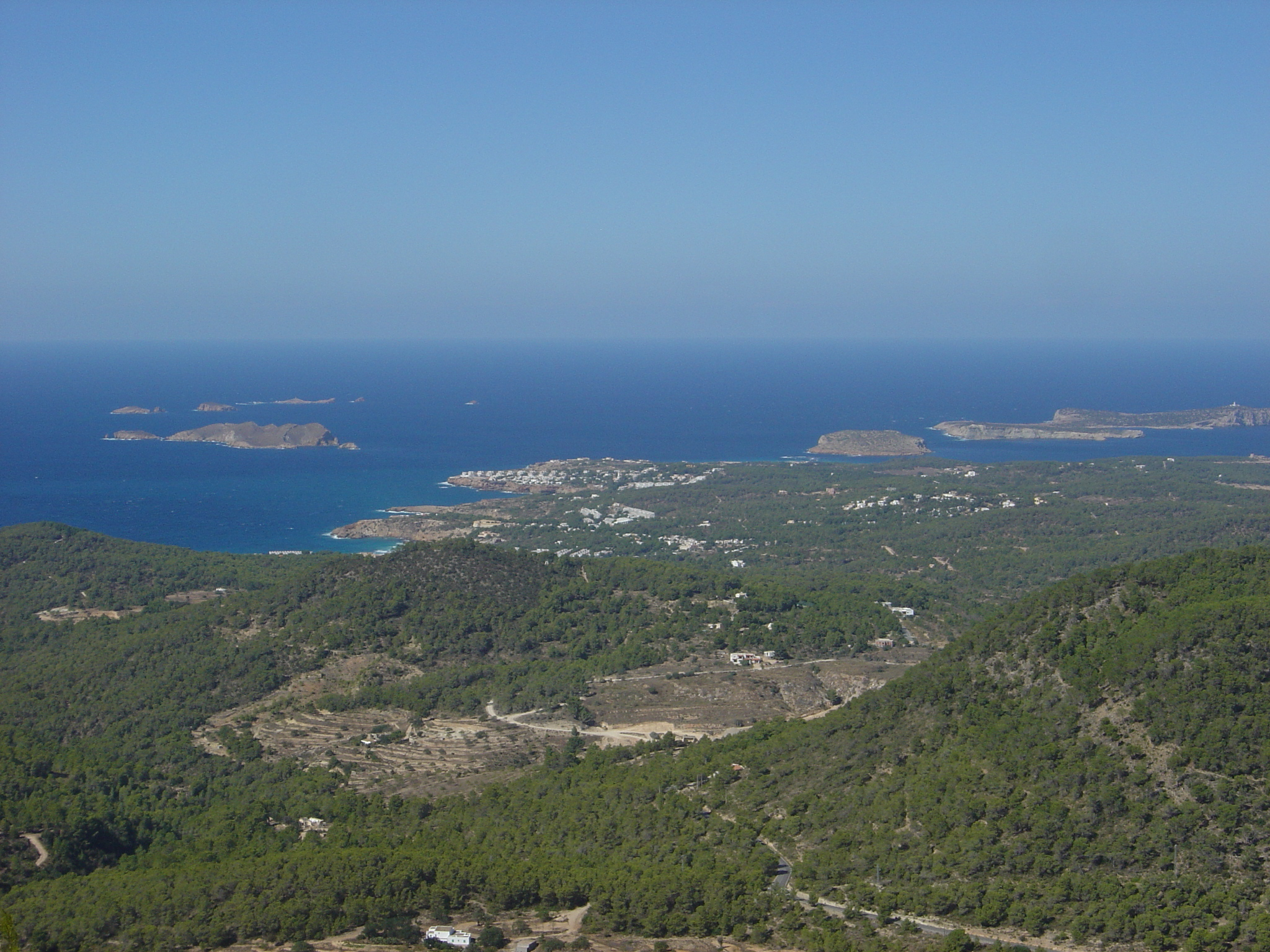
View of the sea from the top of Sa Talaiassa.

Sa Talaiassa (Catalan pronunciation: [sə tələˈjasə]), also known as Sa Talaia or Sa Talaia de Sant Josep, is the highest mountain on the island of Ibiza in the Balearic Islands of Spain. It is located in the southwest of the island. Talaia, the name of the mountain, means "watchtower" in Catalan, Talaiassa referring to an especially large one.

Sant Josep de sa Talaia, the island's largest municipality, is named after this mountain.

== Aviation Accident ==
In 1972, an Iberia Caravelle airliner crashed into Sa Talaiassa, killing all 104 people on board.

== See also ==
- Ibiza (Eivissa)
