= List of shipwrecks in February 1860 =

The list of shipwrecks in February 1860 includes ships sunk, foundered, grounded, or otherwise lost during February 1860.

== 1 February ==
List of shipwrecks: 1 February 1860
Ship	State	Description
Ann Morgan	United Kingdom	The ship sprang a leak and sank in the Irish Sea off Wicklow Head, County Wicklow. Her crew survived. She was on a voyage from Strangford, County Antrim to Swansea, Glamorgan.
Asia	United Kingdom	The brig was abandoned in the Atlantic Ocean off the Outer Hebrides (48°30′N 12°00′W) with the loss of a crew member. Survivors were rescued by Japanese (United Kingdom). Asia was on a voyage from Bahia, Brazil to Queenstown, County Cork.
Britannia	United Kingdom	The sloop ran aground on the Doom Bar and sank. She was on a voyage from Bangor to Aberdeen.
Christian Charlotte	United Kingdom	The ship sprang a leak and foundered off the coast of Yorkshire. Her crew were rescued. She was on a voyage from Sunderland, County Durham to London.
Crocodile	United Kingdom	The schooner was wrecked on Skomer, Pembrokeshire. Her crew were rescued. She was on a voyage from Kinsale, County Cork to Bristol, Gloucestershire.
Cuba	United Kingdom	The brig ran aground on the Halliday Flats, in the North Sea off the coast of Essex, She was on a voyage from Hartlepool, County Durham to London. She was refloated and resumed her voyage.
Lord Melbourne	United Kingdom	The ship was wrecked at Lindisfarne, Northumberland, Her crew were rescued. She was on a voyage from Inverness to London.
Helena	United Kingdom	The ship was driven ashore and severely damaged at Bridlington, Yorkshire. She was on a voyage from South Shields, County Durham to Honfleur, Calvados, France.
Holland	Belgium	The steamship collided with the steamship Gertrude (United Kingdom) and sank in the River Thames. All on board were rescued. Holland was on a voyage from Ostend, West Flanders to London.
William and Henry	United Kingdom	The schooner was driven ashore and severely damaged at Holyhead, Anglesey. She was on a voyage from Liverpool, Lancashire to Llanelly, Glamorgan.
Winscales	United Kingdom	The full-rigged ship was abandoned in the Indian Ocean. Her fourteen crew survived. She was on a voyage from Aden to Moulmein, Burma.

== 2 February ==
List of shipwrecks: 2 February 1860
Ship	State	Description
Augusta	Sweden–Norway	The barque collided with the brig Useful (United Kingdom) and sank in the Mediterranean Sea 30 nautical miles (56 km) off Cape de Gatt, Spain with the loss of six of her twelve crew. Survivors were rescued by Useful. Augusta was on a voyage from Odesa to Falmouth, Cornwall, United Kingdom.
Elizabeth Dawson	United Kingdom	The barque collided with another barque and sank off South Foreland, Kent. Her fourteen crew survived.Elizabeth Daswon was on a voyage from Sunderland, County Durham to Alexandria, Egypt.
Horatia	United Kingdom	The ship foundered in the North Sea with the loss of all thirteen crew. A message in a bottle washed up a South Shields, County Durham in early January 1861 stating that the ship was sinking and the crew were exhausted. She was on a voyage from Arkhangelsk, Russia to a British port.
Isabella	United Kingdom	The ship was driven ashore in Balcary Bay with the loss of two of her crew.
Jane and Ellen	United Kingdom	The sloop was wrecked at Fécamp, Seine-Inférieure, France. Her three crew were rescued. She was on a voyage from the Clyde to Saint-Valery-sur-Somme, Somme, France.
Lord Hill	United Kingdom	The schooner ran aground on the Herd Sand, in the North Sea off the coast of County Durham. She was refloated on 4 February and taken in to South Shields in a damaged condition.
Mary Banfield	United Kingdom	The schooner was damaged by fire in the Firth of Clyde. She was on a voyage from Greenock, Renfrewshire to Montevideo, Uruguay. She put back to Greenock for repairs.
Prince of Wales	(United Kingdom of Great Britain and Ireland) British North America	The schooner was run into and was abandoned. Her crew were rescued by Emily Jane (United Kingdom of Great Britain and Ireland) British North America. Prince of Wales was on a voyage from "Starks Island" to New York.
Red Jacket	United Kingdom	The Mersey Flat ran aground on the Burbo Bank, in Liverpool Bay and sank with the loss of all hands. She was on a voyage from Fleetwood to Liverpool, Lancashire.
Susan	United Principalities	The brig was driven ashore at Barber's Point, in the Dardanelles. She was on a voyage from South Shields, County Durham to Constantinople, Ottoman Empire. She was refloated the next day and taken in to Constantinople.
Theodora Henrietta	Netherlands	The ship was wrecked on the Borkum Reef, in the North Sea off the coast of the Kingdom of Hanover and was abandoned by her crew. She was on a voyage from Newcastle upon Tyne, Northumberland, United Kingdom to Amsterdam, North Holland.

== 3 February ==
List of shipwrecks: 3 February 1860
Ship	State	Description
Condor	Bremen	The barque struck a reef in the Gulf of Siam and was wrecked. She was on a voyage from Macao, China to Bangkok, Siam.
Matilda	United Kingdom	The schooner was driven ashore on Lindisfarne, Northumberland. She was on a voyage from Aberdeen to Blyth, Northumberland. She had become a wreck by 12 February.
Osprey	United Kingdom	The schooner was driven ashore on Lindisfarne. She was on a voyage from Bangor to Berwick upon Tweed, Northumberland. She was refloated the next day and completed her voyage.
Thomas Fergusson	United Kingdom	The schooner was driven ashore at North Sunderland, County Durham. She was on a voyage from London to Invergordon, Ross-shire. She was refloated on 6 February and taken in to Berwick upon Tweed.

== 4 February ==
List of shipwrecks: 4 February 1860
Ship	State	Description
Bohemian Girl	United Kingdom	The schooner collided with a brig in the Atlantic Ocean. She was consequently abandoned on 6 February. Six of her crew were rescued by the steamship Adonis (Kingdom of Hanover), the seventh was thought to have got on board the brig during the collision. Bohemian Girl was on a voyage from Gallipoli, Ottoman Empire to Hull, Yorkshire. She was towed in to A Coruña, Spain by Adonis, arriving on 2 March.
Christina	(United Kingdom of Great Britain and Ireland) New Zealand	The schooner was wrecked in Palliser Bay.
Favourite	(United Kingdom of Great Britain and Ireland) New South Wales	The schooner was wrecked in the South Sea Islands.

== 5 February ==
List of shipwrecks: 5 February 1860
Ship	State	Description
Grays	United Kingdom	The barque was abandoned in the Atlantic Ocean 500 nautical miles (930 km) off Saint Helena. Her twelve crew survived. She was on a voyage from "Kooria Mooria" (Khuriya Muriya Islands) to an English port
Industry	United Kingdom	The sloop ran aground on the Sow and Pigs Rock, off the coast of Northumberland. She was refloated.
Jane and Ann	United Kingdom	The smack collided with Elizabeth (United Kingdom and sank in the River Mersey off New Brighton, Cheshire. Her crew were rescued.
Romance of the Lee	United Kingdom	The ship was driven ashore and wrecked 200 nautical miles (370 km) west of Alexandria, Egypt with the loss of all but two of her crew. She was on a voyage from Constantinople, Ottoman Empire to an English port.

== 6 February ==
List of shipwrecks: 6 February 1860
Ship	State	Description
Fortitude	United Kingdom	The ship was holed by her anchor and sank at Penarth, Glamorgan. Her crew were rescued. She was on a voyage from Newport, Monmouthshire to Ipswich, Suffolk.
John and Mary	United Kingdom	The smack was driven ashore at Cromarty.

== 7 February ==
List of shipwrecks: 7 February 1860
Ship	State	Description
Emilie	France	The schooner sank off the North Foreland, Kent, United Kingdom with the loss of all hands.
Pearl	United Kingdom	The barque was destroyed by fire at Cochin, India. Her twelve crew survived.
Redlich	United Kingdom	The ship was beached at Fleetwood, Lancashire.

== 8 February ==
List of shipwrecks: 8 February 1860
Ship	State	Description
Albion, Excelsior, Giraffe, Tercieuse, and Triton	France; United Kingdom; United Kingdom; Portugal; France	The schooner Tercieuse broke free from the tug which was manoeuvreing her in the River Thames at London Bridge. She drove into the schooner Excelsior and the pair of them were carried downstream broadside on. They collided with the steamships Albion, Giraffe and Triton, which broke from their moorings. All five vessels drove into London Bridge and were damaged or severely damaged.
Eagle	United Kingdom	The ship struck a sunken rock in the Isle of Scilly and was beached. She was on a voyage from Llanelly, Glamorgan to London.
Glencoe	United Kingdom	The ship ran aground on the Insand, in the North Sea off the coast of County Durham. She was on a voyage from South Shields, County Durham to Canton, China. She was refloated.
Hungarian	United Kingdom	The steamship was wrecked at Cape Ledge, Nova Scotia, British North America, with the loss of all 205 people on board. She was on a voyage from Liverpool, Lancashire to Portland, Maine, United States.
Isabella	United Kingdom	The full-rigged ship was driven ashore at Malta. She was on a voyage from the River Tyne to Alexandria, Egypt. She was refloated on 12 February.
Messenger	(United Kingdom of Great Britain and Ireland) New South Wales	The schooner foundered off the Long Reef. She was on a voyage from the Brisbane Water to Sydney.

== 9 February ==
List of shipwrecks: 9 February 1860
Ship	State	Description
Brisk	United Kingdom	The ship struck the pier at Lowestoft, Suffolk and was severely damaged. She was on a voyage from Maldon, Essex to Sunderland, County Durham.
Dumfriesshire	United Kingdom	The barque was abandoned in the Atlantic Ocean with the loss of one of her fourteen crew. She was on a voyage from Callao, Peru to an English port.
Thalia	United Kingdom	The brig ran aground on the Sizewell Bank, in the North Sea off the coast of Suffolk. She was on a voyage from South Shields, County Durham to London. She was refloated and taken in to Lowestoft, Suffolk in a leaky condition.

== 10 February ==
List of shipwrecks: 10 February 1860
Ship	State	Description
Ashley Down, or South Downs	United Kingdom	The ship struck The Wolves, in the Bristol Channel and sank. Her crew survived. She was on a voyage from Newport, Monmouthshire to Portsmouth, Hampshire.
Bezer	United Kingdom	The ship ran aground at Lowestoft, Suffolk. She was on a voyage from São Miguel Island, Azores to Lowestoft. She was refloated.
Clyde, and Queen Esther	United Kingdom	The brigs were driven into each other and severely damaged in a gale at New York, United States.
George Potts	United Kingdom	The snow was wrecked at Syra, Greece. Her ten crew survived. She was on a voyage from Rhodes to Thessaloniki.
H. Hudson	United States	The steamship was severely damaged in a gale at New York.
Isaac Newton	United States	The steamship was severely damaged in a gale at New York.
Jane Hughes	United Kingdom	The ship ran aground at Lowestoft. She was on a voyage from Port Madoc, Caernarfonshire to Newburgh, Fife.
Ralph Bernal	United Kingdom	The fishing smack was driven ashore and wrecked at Easton Bavents, Suffolk, England. Her nine crew survived.

== 11 February ==
List of shipwrecks: 11 February 1860
Ship	State	Description
Allerton Packet	United Kingdom	The ship was driven ashore near Hellevoetsluis, Zeeland, Netherlands. She was refloated on 13 February and taken in to Hellevoetsluis.
Hermine	United Kingdom	The brig was destroyed by fire. She was on a voyage from Singapore, Straits Settlements to Bassein, Burma. Her twelve crew survived.
Salisbury Harrison	United Kingdom	The brig ran aground on the Gunfleet Sand, in the North Sea of the coast of Suffolk. She was refloated and assisted in to Harwich, Essex.
Teesdale	United Kingdom	The schooner was lost at sea. Her seven crew survived. She was on a voyage from Dysart, Fife to Cádiz, Spain.

== 12 February ==
List of shipwrecks: 12 February 1860
Ship	State	Description
Ann Prentiss	United States	The brig was abandoned in the Atlantic Ocean. Her eight crew were rescued by the barque Cleopatra (United Kingdom).
Emile	France	The brig ran aground in the Glenan Islands, Finistère and was beached near Lesconil. She was on a voyage from Bordeaux, Gironde to Cardiff, Glamorgan, United Kingdom.
Irish Lily	United Kingdom	The ship ran aground at Crookhaven, County Cork. She was on a voyage from Cork to Dingle, County Kerry. She was refloated but found to be waterlogged.
Jellica	Austrian Empire	The barque was wrecked on the Blackwater Bank, in the Irish Sea off the coast of County Wexford, United Kingdom. She was on a voyage from Silloth, Cumberland, United Kingdom to Trieste.
Marion Ridley	United Kingdom	The ship was lost in the Strait of Belle Isle. Her crew were rescued. She was on a voyage from Porto, Portugal to Harbour Grace, Newfoundland, British North America.

== 13 February ==
List of shipwrecks: 13 February 1860
Ship	State	Description
Barbadoes	United Kingdom	The ship was driven ashore at Selsey Bill, Sussex. She was on a voyage from Grimsby, Lincolnshire to Barbados. She was refloated and taken in to Spithead, Hampshire.
Belford	United Kingdom	The brig struck the Cowliers Rock, off Land's End, Cornwall and became waterlogged. Her seven crew survived. She was on a voyage from Rouen, Seine-Inférieure, France to Cardiff, Glamorgan.
Belmont	United Kingdom	The brig foundered in the Mediterranean Sea off Capo Passero, Sicily. Her nine crew were rescued by the barque Chechi ( Austrian Empire). Belmont was on a voyage from Zante, United States of the Ionian Islands to London.
Eleven	United Kingdom	The brig struck the Shipwash Sand, in the North Sea off the coast of Suffolk and foundered off Bawdsey. Her crew were rescued. She was on a voyage from Sunderland, County Durham to London.
Helena	Netherlands	The ship collided with Allerton Packet (United Kingdom) and sank off Hellevoetsluis, Zeeland.
John Alexander	United Kingdom	The ship ran aground and was beached at Kirkcudbright. She was on a voyage from Liverpool, Lancashire to Kirkcudbright. She was refloated the next day and taken in to Kirkcudbrigh.
Sanmaritano	Spain	The brig was wrecked on the Margate Sand, off the coast of Kent, United Kingdom. Her nineteen crew were rescued by the lifeboat Northumberland (United Kingdom). Sanmaritano was on a voyage from Antwerp, Belgium to Santander.
St. Lorenz	United Kingdom	The barque was wrecked on "the island of Jura". She was on a voyage from Gallipoli, Ottoman Empire to Marseille, Bouches-du-Rhône, France.

== 14 February ==
List of shipwrecks: 14 February 1860
Ship	State	Description
Alert	United Kingdom	The schooner struck the breakwater and sank at Weymouth, Dorset. She was on a voyage from Portland to Bridport, Dorset.
Amethyst	United Kingdom	The ship was holed by ice and sank in the River Tay. She was on a voyage from Dundee, Forfarshire to London.
Blackett	United Kingdom	The ship ran aground on the Sunk Sand, in the North Sea off the coast of Essex and sank. Her crew were rescued.
Cinq Frères	France	The ship was driven ashore and capsized near Gravelines, Nord. Her crew were rescued. She was on a voyage from Dunkirk, Nord to Sunderland, County Durham, United Kingdom.
Endeavour	United Kingdom	The sloop was taken in to the Isles of Scilly in a derelict condition. Her crew had previously been taken off by the barque Springfield (United Kingdom). Endeavour was on a voyage from Port Madoc, Caernarfonshire to Portsmouth, Hampshire.
Jeune Hortense	France	The ship was driven ashore at Whitstable, Kent, United Kingdom. She was on a voyage from Dunkirk to Roscoff, Finistère. She was refloated on 26 February and towed in to Ramsgate, Kent in a leaky condition.
Margaret	United Kingdom	The ship was driven ashore at Dundalk, County Louth. She was on a voyage from Dundalk to Troon, Ayrshire. She was refloated on 24 February.
Mary	United Kingdom	The schooner was driven ashore at Rattray Head, Aberdeenshire. She was on a voyage from Fraserburgh, Aberdeenshire to Sunderland. She was refloated on 23 February and taken in to Fraserburgh.
Z. D.	United States	The barque was destroyed by fire at Buenos Aires, Argentina.

== 15 February ==
List of shipwrecks: 15 February 1860
Ship	State	Description
American	United Kingdom	The brig was driven ashore at Boston, Massachusetts, United States. She was on a voyage from Halifax, Nova Scotia, British North America to Boston.
Candidate	United Kingdom	The ship sank at Rhoscolyn, Denbighshire. She was on a voyage from Dublin to Port Dinorwic, Caernarfonshire.
London	United Kingdom	The steamship collided with the steamship Wearmouth (United Kingdom) in the River Thames and was beached at Erith, Kent. London was on a voyage from London to Dundee, Forfarshire.
Sarah and Isabella	United Kingdom	The snow was driven ashore and wrecked on Formentera, Spain. Her nine crew survived. She was on a voyage from Leith, Lothian to Marseille, Bouches-du-Rhône, France.

== 16 February ==
List of shipwrecks: 16 February 1860
Ship	State	Description
Blessing	United Kingdom	The brig foundered in the Bay of Biscay. Her twelve crew were rescued by Nina (United Kingdom). Blessing was on a voyage from Sunderland, County Durham to Bordeaux, Gironde.
Constantia	Sweden–Norway	The yacht was driven ashore near "Grevill Hellesund".
Esperanca	Portugal	The ship sprang a leak and was abandoned off Santa Maria Island, Azores. Her crew were rescued.
Evangeline	United Kingdom	The ship was wrecked at Algiers, Algeria with the loss of all but one of her crew.
Ferris	United Kingdom	The barque was abandoned in the Atlantic Ocean. She was on a voyage from New York, United States to Liverpool, Lancashire. She was taken in to Philadelphia, Pennsylvania, United States on 23 February.
Johann Martin	Netherlands	The ship was abandoned in the Atlantic Ocean. Her crew were rescued. She was on a voyage from Maracaibo, Venezuela to Liverpool.
Reliance	United Kingdom	The barque struck a sunken wreck off the Kentish Knock Lightship ( Trinity House) and was damaged. She was on a voyage from Grimsby, Lincolnshire to Dieppe, Seine-Inférieure, France. She was refloated and taken in to Ramsgate, Kent in a sinking condition.

== 17 February ==
List of shipwrecks: 17 February 1860
Ship	State	Description
Admiral Cator	United Kingdom	The steamship ran aground on the Massdroogen. She was refloated the next day and taken in to Rotterdam, South Holland, Netherlands.
Echo	Hamburg	The brig was run down and sunk off Youghal, County Cork, United Kingdom by an American ship with the loss of three lives. She was on a voyage from Laguna to Liverpool, Lancashire, United Kingdom.
Enchantress	United Kingdom	The steamship ran aground on the Maasdroogen. She was refloated the next day and taken in to Rotterdam.
Gazelle	United Kingdom	The paddle steamer ran aground at Dunkirk, Nord, France and was severely damaged. She was on a voyage from Hull, Yorkshire to Dunkirk.
Hawk	United Kingdom	The steamship ran aground on the Maasdroogen. She was refloated the next day and taken in to Rotterdam.
John Bull	United Kingdom	The sloop was wrecked at Great Yarmouth, Norfolk. Her five crew were rescued by the Great Yarmouth Lifeboat.
Lord Teignmouth	United Kingdom	The ship was holed by an anchor and sank in the River Thames. Her crew were rescued. She was on a voyage from Sunderland, County Durham to London.

== 18 February ==
List of shipwrecks: 18 February 1860
Ship	State	Description
Alex	United Kingdom	The schooner was wrecked in Girvan Bay.
Bloomer	United Kingdom	The schooner was abandoned in the River Lune. She drove ashore and sank on 20 February.
British Tar	United Kingdom	The brig was driven ashore at Spittal, Northumberland. She was on a voyage from Berwick upon Tweed, Northumberland to South Shields, County Durham. She was refloated on 21 February ad put back to Berwick upon Tweed.
Jane Morice	United Kingdom	The ship ran aground on the Hoyle Bank, in Liverpool Bay. She was on a voyage from Liverpool, Lancashire to Port Natal, Cape Colony. She was refloated on 23 February and put back to Liverpool.
Marian	United Kingdom	The ship ran aground off Melbourne, Victoria. She was on a voyage from the Clyde to Melbourne. She was refloated on 21 February.
Montserrat	Spain	The steamship was wrecked between Benicarló and Vinaròs. All on board were rescued.
Pandora	United Kingdom	The ship ran aground on the Newcombe Sand, in the North Sea off the coast of Suffolk. She was refloated and taken in to Lowestoft, Suffolk in a leaky condition.
Ocean Belle	United Kingdom	The brigantine was driven ashore on Long Island, New York, United States. She was on a voyage from Santa Cruz, Cuba to Boston, Massachusetts. She had been refloated by 6 March and towed in to East Marion, New York.
Robina	United Kingdom	The schooner collided with the barque Rosella (United Kingdom) and was abandoned 18 nautical miles (33 km) north west of Cape St. Vincent, Portugal. Her six crew were rescued by Rosella. Robina was on a voyage from Troon, Ayrshire to Waterford and Cádiz, Spain.
St. Lawrence	United Kingdom	The barque was driven ashore near Syra, Kingdom of Greece. Her seven crew survived. She was on a voyage from Gallipoli, Ottoman Empire to Cette, Hérault, France.

== 19 February ==
List of shipwrecks: 19 February 1860
Ship	State	Description
Augusta	United Kingdom	The steamship ran aground on the Dove Spit, in Liverpool Bay. She was on a voyage from Liverpool, Lancashire to Bristol, Gloucestershire. She was refloated on 23 February and towed back to Liverpool.
Bell	United Kingdom	The sloop was driven ashore and wrecked south of Amble, Northumberland. Her crew were rescued. She was on a voyage from Sunderland, County Durham to Leith, Lothian.
Catherine	United Kingdom	The schooner was abandoned in the Irish Sea off the coast of Lancashire. Her four crew were rescued by the Fleetwood Lifeboat.
Charles Wood	United Kingdom	The ship was driven ashore at Greenock, Renfrewshire. She was on a voyage from Greenock to Naples, Kingdom of the Two Sicilies. She was refloated the next day.
Fanny	Hamburg	The ship was wrecked 2.5 nautical miles (4.6 km) east of Wydah, Dahomey.
Gambia	United Kingdom	The brig was driven ashore at Wydah whilst assisting Fanny (Hamburg).
Hampshire	United Kingdom	The ship struck the breakwater at Sunderland, County Durham and was beached. She was on a voyage from Sunderland to Alexandria, Egypt. She was a total loss.
H. B. Crosby	United States	The ship was driven ashore at Sandy Cove, Nova Scotia, British North America. She was on a voyage from Boston, Massachusetts to Halifax, Nova Scotia. She was consequently condemned.
Hero	United Kingdom	The ship was driven ashore at Greenock. She was on a voyage form Greenock to Galway. She was refloated the next day.
Jenny Jenkins	United Kingdom	The schooner ran aground on the Newcombe Sand, in the North Sea off the coast of Suffolk. She was refloated and resumed her voyage.
Luna	United States	The full-rigged ship was driven ashore and wrecked at Barfleur, Manche, France. There were two survivors amongst the 107 people on board. She was on a voyage from Havre de Grâce, Seine-Inférieure, France to New Orleans, Louisiana.
Martha Clay	United Kingdom	The barque ran aground at South Shields, County Durham. She was on a voyage from South Shields to Havana, Cuba. She was refloated and resumed her voyage, but consequently put in to Grimsby, Lincolnshire in a leaky condition.
Niagara	United Kingdom	The barque was driven ashore and wrecked on the Black Rock, 2 nautical miles (3.7 km) north of Ayr. Her fifteen crew were rescued by the Ayr Lifeboat North Britain (United Kingdom). Niagara was on a voyage from Troon, Ayrshire to Syra, Greece.
Ondine	United Kingdom	The steamship collided with the schooner Heroine (United Kingdom) and sank in the English Channel off Beachy Head, Sussex with the loss of 51 lives. One survivor was rescued by the brig Salem (United States). Five survivors were rescued by the steamship Thetis (United Kingdom) and twenty were rescued by Heroine. Ondine was on a voyage from Waterford to London.
Pax	United Kingdom	The brig collided with a schooner and was abandoned in the North Sea 15 nautical miles (28 km) off Spurn Point, Yorkshire. Her crew were rescued by the smack Wanderer (United Kingdom) Pax was on a voyage from Hartlepool, County Durham to London.
Royal Victoria	United Kingdom	The schooner was driven ashore at "Bulcrane", County Londonderry. Her crew were rescued.
Town of Liverpool	United Kingdom	The ship was driven ashore at Cromarty.

== 20 February ==
List of shipwrecks: 20 February 1860
Ship	State	Description
Amelia	United Kingdom	The ship departed from Liverpool, Lancashire for Limerick. No further trace, presumed foundered in the Irish Sea with the loss of all hands.
August Eberhard	Bremen	The ship was lost at Boa Vista, Cape Verde Islands. She was on a voyage from Grimsby, Lincolnshire, United Kingdom to Bahia, Brazil.
Countess of Fife	United Kingdom	The schooner was driven ashore and wrecked on the south coast of Menorca, Spain. She was on a voyage from London to Marseille, Bouches-du-Rhône, France.
Emlyn	United Kingdom	The schooner was driven ashore and wrecked at Le Tréport, Seine-Inférieure, France. Her four crew survived. She was on a voyage from Sunderland, County Durham to Le Tréport.
Enchantress	Royal Navy	HMS Sidon destroying Enchantress at Mayotte The storeship was wrecked at Mayotte. The wreck was destroyed by HMS Sidon (Royal Navy).
Evangelina	United Kingdom	The full-rigged ship was driven ashore at Philippeville, Algeria.
Fortuna	United Kingdom	schooner ran aground on the Goodwin Sands, Kent, United Kingdom. She was on a voyage Lisbon, Portugal to Newcastle upon Tyne, Northumberland, United Kingdom. She was refloated and taken in to Ramsgate, Kent.
Inkerman	United Kingdom	The barque ran aground on the Brake Sand. She was on a voyage from the River Tyne to Constantinople, Ottoman Empire. She was refloated the next day.
Sebastopol	United Kingdom	The full-rigged ship was driven ashore in Glory Bay. She was on a voyage from Newcastle, New South Wales to San Francisco, California, United States.
Sylvia	United Kingdom	The ship collided with Amity (United Kingdom) and sank in the Swin, off the coast of Essex. Her crew were rescued by Amity. Sylvia was on a voyage from Middlesbrough, Yorkshire to Rochester, Kent.
Thomas and Hannah	United Kingdom	The ship was holed by her anchor at Lowestoft, Suffolk and was consequently beached.
No. 15	United Kingdom	The Mersey Flat capsized in the River Mersey. Her crew were rescued by the steamship Alice (United Kingdom).

== 21 February ==
List of shipwrecks: 21 February 1860
Ship	State	Description
Eliza Grieve	United Kingdom	The brig capsized in the Atlantic Ocean off Newfoundland, British North America. Her twelve crew were rescued by the steamship City of Washington (United Kingdom). Eliza Grive was on a voyage from Baltimore, Maryland, United States to Saint John, New Brunswick, British North America.
Isle of Skye	United Kingdom	The barque foundered in the Atlantic Ocean 250 nautical miles (460 km) off Lisbon. Her eleven crew survived. She was on a voyage from Liverpool, Lancashire to Buenos Aires, Argentina.
Youth	(United Kingdom of Great Britain and Ireland) Jersey	The barque was wrecked at Pedra de Lume, Cape Verde Islands. Her nine crew survived.

== 22 February ==
List of shipwrecks: 22 February 1860
Ship	State	Description
Aimable Juliette	France	The ship was abandoned in the Atlantic Ocean 90 nautical miles (170 km) south west of Cape Finisterre, Spain. Her crew were rescued. She was on a voyage from Nantes, Loire-Inférieure to L'Orient, Morbihan.
Hebe	United Kingdom	The barque was wrecked at Agrigento, Sicily. Her eight crew survived.
Jessie Thoms	United Kingdom	The brigantine was wrecked at Agrigento. Her eight crew survived.
Katy Darling	United Kingdom	The brig was wrecked at Agrigento. Her ten crew survived.
Pomona	United Kingdom	The steamship foundered in the Mediterranean Sea off Gozo, Malta with the loss of twenty of her crew. Eleven crew and four passengers were rescued by Maria Catarina ( Austrian Empire), fourteen crew were lost. She was on a voyage from Odesa to London.
Themis	Sweden–Norway	The brig was wrecked on the south coast of Sicily with the loss of all hands. She was on a voyage from Terra Nova to Alexandria, Egypt.

== 23 February ==
List of shipwrecks: 23 February 1860
Ship	State	Description
Anna Kimball	United States	The full-rigged ship ran aground on the Whitburn Steel, in the North Sea off the coast of County Durham, United Kingdom. She was on a voyage from London to South Shields, County Durham. Anna Kimball was refloated with assistance from the tugs Harkaway and Vanguard) (both United Kingdom) and towed in to North Shields, County Durham.
Clymene	United Kingdom	The barque was abandoned at sea. Her fourteen crew were rescued by the galiot Sirene (Netherlands). Clymene was on a voyage from Gravesend, Kent to Genoa, Kingdom of the Two Sicilies.
Louise	France	The steamship struck the pier and sank at Bastia, Corsica with the loss of 50 lives. She was on a voyage from Bastia to Marseille, Bouches-du-Rhône.
Queen of Sheba	United Kingdom	The barque ran aground on the Mussel Scarp, in the North Sea off the coast of County Durham. She was on a voyage from South Shields to Aden. She was refloated and towed back to South Shields.
William and Samuel	United Kingdom	The schooner was driven ashore and damaged at Redcar, Yorkshire. She was on a voyage from Colchester, Essex to Hartlepool, County Durham. She was refloated and taken in to Hartlepool.

== 24 February ==
List of shipwrecks: 24 February 1860
Ship	State	Description
Delphine	France	The schooner was driven ashore and wrecked at Redcar, Yorkshire, United Kingdom. Her crew survived.
Emma Elisa	Prussia	The ship was driven ashore at Helsingør, Denmark. She was o a voyage from South Shields, County Durham, United Kingdom to Königsberg. She was refloated on 28 February and taken in to Helsingør.
Indus	India	The steamship was lost between Kurrachee and "Ghizzee". Her crew were rescued.
Neptunus	Rostock	The ship was wrecked by ice at Kalundborg, Sweden. She was on a voyage from Liverpool, Lancashire, United Kingdom to Rostock.
Secret	United Kingdom	The tug was crushed between two ships and severely damaged at Sunderland, County Durham.
HDMS Slesvig	Royal Danish Navy	The paddle steamer was severely damaged by fire. Subsequently repaired and returned to service.
Tweelingen	Netherlands	The brig struck a sunken rock in the Farne Islands, Northumberland, United Kingdom and was holed. She was on a voyage from Rotterdam, South Holland to Leith, Lothian, United Kingdom. She completed her voyage on 28 February in a waterlogged condition.
Vasalissatis Elida	Greece	The ship was driven ashore at Piraeus. She was on a voyage from Cardiff, Glamorgan, United Kingdom to Piraeus. She was refloated.

== 25 February ==
List of shipwrecks: 25 February 1860
Ship	State	Description
Alice	United Kingdom	The ship was wrecked at Liscannor, County Clare. Her crew were rescued.
Helen	United Kingdom	The brig ran aground on the Smithwick Sand, in the North Sea off the coast of Yorkshire. She was refloated.
Jane Williams	United Kingdom	The ship struck Sarn Badrig and was consequently beached at Abersoch, Caernarfonshire. She was on a voyage from Briton Ferry, Glamorgan to Liverpool, Lancashire.
Radiant	United Kingdom	The brig was driven ashore at Hadston, Northumberland. She was on a voyage from Dieppe, Seine-Inférieure, France to Warkworth, Northumberland. She was refloated on 8 March and taken in to Warkworth.
Windward	United Kingdom	The full-rigged ship was driven ashore and severely at Fraserburgh, Aberdeenshire. She was on a voyage from Fraserburgh to Greenland.

== 26 February ==
List of shipwrecks: 26 February 1860
Ship	State	Description
Maria	Denmark	The schooner was driven ashore near Fredrikshavn. She was on a voyage from Charleston, South Carolina, United States to Nykøbing. She was refloated and taken in to Fredrikshavn, where she sank.
Nestor	United Kingdom	The snow was abandoned in the Atlantic Ocean. Her nine crew survived. She was on a voyage from Sunderland, County Durham to Bordeaux, Gironde, France.
Taylor	United Kingdom	The brig foundered. Her crew survived.

== 27 February ==
List of shipwrecks: 27 February 1860
Ship	State	Description
Airdiamount	United Kingdom	The smack foundered at Rothesay, Isle of Bute.
Cezimpra	United Kingdom	The schooner ran aground on the sands at the back of the Bude breakwater, Cornwall. Her crew escaped via a line thrown to the shore. She was on a voyage from Swansea, Glamorgan to Devoran, Cornwall.
Eagle	United Kingdom	The ship was driven ashore at Bowmore, Islay. She was on a voyage from Liverpool, Lancashire to Ballina, County Mayo. She was refloated on 9 March.
Margaret	United Kingdom	The sloop was driven ashore near North Berwick, Lothian. Her crew were rescued. She was on a voyage from South Shields, County Durham to Pettycur, Fife.
Nimrod	United Kingdom	The paddle steamer was driven ashore and wrecked at St. Davids, Pembrokeshire with the loss of all 38 people on board. She was on a voyage from Liverpool, Lancashire to Cork.
Scotia	United Kingdom	The steamship was driven ashore in Girvan Bay. All on board were rescued.
Success	France	The schooner was driven ashore and wrecked south of Irvine, Ayrshire, United Kingdom with the loss of all seven crew.
Thomas Graham	United Kingdom	The ship was driven ashore and wrecked in Duart Bay. She was on a voyage from Liverpool to Lerwick, Shetland Islands.
Vigilant	United Kingdom	The smack was wrecked at Latheron, Caithness. Her crew were rescued. She was on a voyage from Lossiemouth, Moray to Thurso, Caithness.

== 28 February ==
List of shipwrecks: 28 February 1860
Ship	State	Description
Ann	United Kingdom	The ship foundered in the Irish Sea off Holyhead, Anglesey. She was on a voyage from Wicklow to the River Mersey.
Ann	United Kingdom	The schooner sank off the Cockle Sand, in the North Sea off the coast of Norfolk, Her crew were rescued. She was on a voyage from Goole, Yorkshire to London.
Archimedes	Greece	The brig was wrecked on Keef's Reef, in the Mediterranean Sea off the coast of Algeria with the loss of five of her eight crew. Survivors took to a raft, and were rescued on 5 March by the brigantine Queen of the West (United Kingdom). Archimedes was on a voyage from Cardiff, Glamorgan, United Kingdom to Syra.
Fortunatus	Kingdom of the Two Sicilies	The ship was driven ashore at Silloth, Cumberland, United Kingdom. She was on a voyage from Naples to Glasgow, Renfrewshire, United Kingdom. She was refloated on 11 March and towed in to Loch Ryan in a severely leaky condition. Subsequently taken in tow for the Clyde.
George and James	United Kingdom	The ship was driven ashore at Winterton-on-Sea, Norfolk. She was later refloated and towed in to Great Yarmouth, Norfolk in a severely leaky condition. f
Helen	United Kingdom	The brig was abandoned in the North Sea off the coast of Yorkshire. Her crew were rescued. She was on a voyage from Hartlepool, County Durham to London.
Hope	United Kingdom	The ship was abandoned off Neuwerk, Duchy of Holstein. Her crew were rescued by Hope (United Kingdom). She was on a voyage from Hartlepool to London.
Kingfisher	United Kingdom	The schooner was driven ashore at Skinningrove, Yorkshire. Her crew were rescued.
Marie Antoinette	France	The schooner caught fire in the River Mersey at Rock Ferry, Cheshire, United Kingdom and was scuttled. She was on a voyage from Nantes, Loire-Inférieure to Liverpool, Lancashire
Mary Ann Susan	United Kingdom	The sloop was driven ashore and wrecked at Dartmouth, Devon. She was on a voyage from Gijón, Spain to London.
Mary Jane	United Kingdom	The ship was abandoned off the Nore with the loss of her captain.
Ocean	United Kingdom	The ship was driven ashore at Huntcliffe, Yorkshire. Her crew were rescued. She broke up on 8 March.
Plenty	United Kingdom	The brig ran aground in the River Wear. She was run into the nexty day by the brig Supply (United Kingdom and was severely damaged.
Robert Mills	United States	The barque was driven ashore and wrecked at Penrhyn, Anglesey. Her crew were rescued. She was on a voyage from Liverpool to Galveston, Texas.
Royal Adelaide	United Kingdom	The schooner was driven ashore at Redcar, Yorkshire. She was on a voyage from Colchester, Essex to Hartlepool. She was refloated and resumed her voyage.
W. H. Warton	United States	The ship was driven onto the Pluckington Bank, in Liverpool Bay. She was on a voyage from Galveston, Texas to Liverpool. She was refloated and taken in to Liverpool.
Zephyr	United Kingdom	The brig was driven on to Scroby Sands, Norfolk with the loss of one of her seven crew. Survivors were rescued by the Great Yarmouth Lifeboat. She was on a voyage from Middlesbrough, Yorkshire to London.

== 29 February ==
List of shipwrecks: 29 February 1860
Ship	State	Description
Bonne Nouvelle	France	The ship was wrecked on the coast of Brittany.
Jeune Marie	France	The ship was wrecked on the coast of Brittany She was on a voyage from Pontrieux, Côtes-du-Nord to Dunkirk, Nord.
Neptunus	Kingdom of Hanover	The ship was driven ashore on Callantsoog, Groningen, Netherlands. She was on a voyage from Emden to London, United Kingdom.
Plover	France	The ship was wrecked on the coast of Brittany.
Trinity	United Kingdom	The ship was wrecked on the coast of Brittany.
William and Sarah	United Kingdom	The barque ran aground on the West Knowl, in the North Sea off the coast of Suffolk. She was on a voyage from London to Aldeburgh, Suffolk. She was refloated and taken in to Orford Haven, Suffolk.

== Unknown date ==
List of shipwrecks: Unknown date in February 1860
Ship	State	Description
Advance	United States	The February gale: The fishing schooner sank in a gale on the Georges Bank. Lost with all 8 hands.
Albertina	Netherlands	The ship was wrecked on Borkum, Kingdom of Hanover. Her crew were rescued. She was on a voyage from Newcastle upon Tyne, Northumberland, United Kingdom to Leer, Kingdom of Hanover.
Anna	United Kingdom	The ship was driven ashore and wrecked in the Friesche Gat before 6 February with the loss of all but one of her crew. She was on a voyage from Hamburg to Great Yarmouth, Norfolk.
Anne Alexandre	France	The schooner was wrecked on the Ooster Bank, in the North Sea off the Dutch coast with the loss of two of the seven people on board. She was on a voyage from Newcastle upon Tyne to Livorno, United Provinces of Central Italy.
Antje Hanerbuit	Netherlands	The ship was abandoned in the Atlantic Ocean off Lisbon, Portugal before 25 February. Her crew were rescued. She was on a voyage from Newport, Monmouthshire, United Kingdom to Alicante, Spain.
Catharina	Grand Duchy of Mecklenburg-Schwerin	The schooner was driven ashore and severely damaged at Alexandria, Egypt on 7 or 9 February.
Eliza Ann	United Kingdom	The ship foundered off the coast of Friesland, Netherlands before 11 February.
Emerald	United Kingdom	The smack foundered in the North Sea on or after 16 February with the loss of all five or six crew.
George Washington	United States	The February gale: The fishing schooner sank in a gale on the Georges Bank. Lost with all 9 hands.
Hunter	United Kingdom	The ship was driven ashore at Alexandria on 7 or 9 February.
Jane	United Kingdom	The ship foundered off Juist, Kingdom of Hanover before 12 February.
Jane Lacy	United Kingdom	The ship was driven ashore at Alexandria on 7 or 9 February. She had been refloated by 11 February.
Jeune Emma	France	The ship was wrecked on the coast of Brittany before 27 February. She was on a voyage from Liverpool to Bordeaux, Gironde.
Jules Amelie	France	The ship was wrecked on the coast of Brittany before 27 February. She was on a voyage from Sunderland, County Durham, United Kingdom to Caen, Calvados.
John	United Kingdom	The lugger foundered in the North Sea with the loss of all seven crew.
Louisa Amelia	United Kingdom	The ship was lost at Coringa, India. Her crew were rescued.
Madonna del Monte Nero	Principality of Serbia	The brig was wrecked at Villa San Giovanni, Kingdom of the Two Sicilies. Her crew were rescued. She was on a voyage from Malta to Marseille, Bouches-du-Rhône, France.
Mary	United Kingdom	The ship was driven ashore near St Combs, Aberdeenshire.
Mary Young	United Kingdom	The ship ran aground on the Shipwash Sand, in the North Sea off the coast of Suffolk. She was on a voyage from South Shields, County Durham to Naples, Kingdom of the Two Sicilies. She was refloated and resumed her voyage, but consequently put in to Portsmouth, Hampshire on 12 February in a leaky condition.
Minister von Borries	Kingdom of Hanover	The ship ran aground off Borkum. She was on a voyage from Newcastle upon Tyne to Trieste. She was refloated and taken in to Delfzijl, Groningen, Netherlands.
Principe Erediturio	Kingdom of Sardinia	The ship collided with another vessel and sank in the Mediterranean Sea. Her crew survived. She was on a voyage from Cardiff, Glamorgan, United Kingdom to Genoa.
Providentia	Stettin	The ship was holed by ice and sank at Dalhousie, New Brunswick, British North America.
Rebecca	Denmark	The schooner was abandoned in the North Sea with the loss of all but two of her crew. She was on a voyage from Fredrikshavn to London, United Kingdom.
Reformer	United Kingdom	The ship was wrecked in the Abaco Islands. She was on a voyage from New York to New Orleans, Louisiana, United States.
Relief	United States	The February gale: The fishing schooner sank in a gale on the Georges Bank. Lost with all 9 hands.
Sir de Lacy Evans	United Kingdom	The full-rigged ship was driven ashore at Alexandria between 6 and 10 February.
Syren	United Kingdom	The ship foundered off Vlieland, Friesland before 9 February.
Tinto	United Kingdom	The ship foundered in the Atlantic Ocean off the coast of County Donegal before 11 February.
William S. Wonson	United States	The February gale: The fishing schooner sank in a gale on the Georges Bank. Lost with all 9 hands.
Xiphias	(United Kingdom of Great Britain and Ireland) British North America	The ship was abandoned in the Atlantic Ocean. Her crew were rescued by Harvest Queen (United States). Xiphias was on a voyage from Saint John, New Brunswick to Liverpool.
