= Ses Bardetes =

- Village
- Location within Spain
- Coordinates: 38°41′59″N 1°25′30″E
- Country: Spain
- Region: Balearic Islands
- Province: Balearic Islands
- Municipality: Formentera
- Time zone: UTC+1 (CET)
  - Summer (DST): UTC+2 (CEST)

Ses Bardetes is a village in Formentera, Balearic Islands, Spain. It is located directly south of the capital of Sant Francesc Xavier.
