= Blessing of the Fleet =

Mediterranean fishing tradition

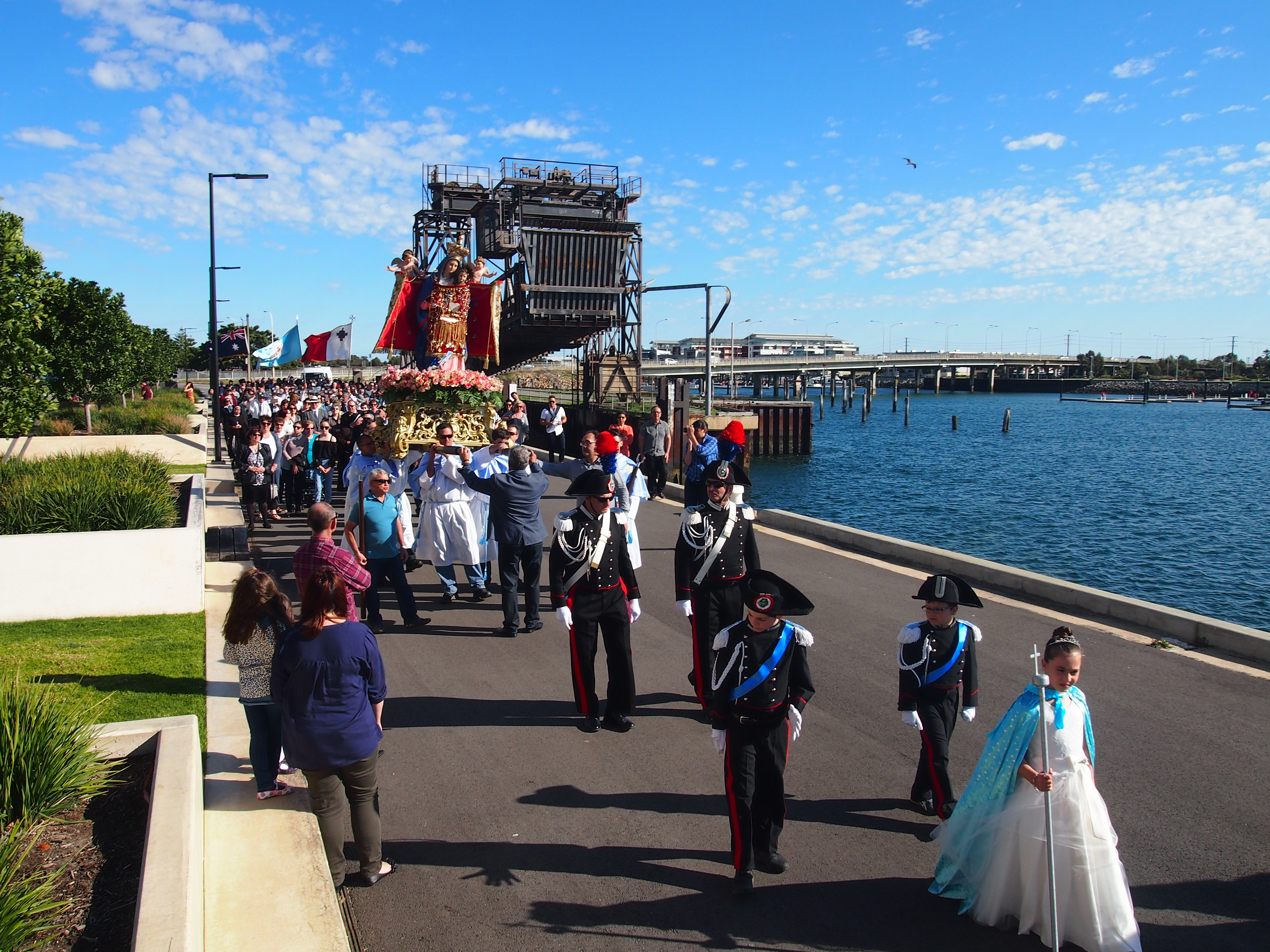
Blessing of the Fleet procession, Port Adelaide, South Australia, 2015

The Blessing of the Fleet is a tradition that began centuries ago in Mediterranean fishing communities. The practice began predominantly Catholic, but is now practiced by all Christians as a blessing from the local priest and pastors that is meant to ensure a safe and bountiful season.

In most ports, the event was brought by immigrants who held strongly to their Christian religious beliefs. The events that are part of the ritual vary by community and range from a simple ceremony to a multi-day festival including a church service, parades, Pageantry, dancing, feasting, and contests.

== History ==
The tradition of blessing ships is very old and has been performed both at the launching of new vessels ("christening") as well as a regular practice to ensure protection of the ship and its crew. The origin of the practice is grounded among other in Jesus' calling of the fishermen to be his apostles as well as in the miraculous catch of fish through the intervention of Jesus.

The tradition of blessing boats seems to have been particularly common in the Mediterranean and blessings for boats from 15th century Italy survive. The blessing was often performed on specific days under the guardianship of different saints such as St. Peter in Gruissan in Occitanie and Birżebbuġa in Malta, St. Vito in Mazara del Vallo in Sicily or the Virgin of Carmel in various places in Spain such as Cartagena, La Savina and Ibiza. The tradition of putting the celebration under the patronage of the Virgin of Carmel in Spain was introduced by Antonio Barceló in the 18th century and therefore the celebrations often take place on the 16th of July (the saint's day) and include an image of the Virgin being carried by one of the boats.

The practice was, however, also known in Northern Europe. Before the reformation, the priests of Yarmouth would bless the fishing ships yearly and the priests would afterwards preach a fishing sermon. In the 19th century Hebrides, additionally to blessing new vessels, every time the crew of a ship changed, a priest would go on board, speak a blessing and sprinkle the boat with Holy water. At the same time, Russian ships bound for Siberia never left the port without being blessed by a priest.

The current practice of Blessing the Fleet in the US appears to have emerged in the 20th century when the fishing industry was developing along the Gulf Coast and then spread in the decades after the World War II. The possibly first Blessing of the Fleet took place in Biloxi, Mississippi in 1929 which were then followed by blessings in La Batre, Alabama and Brunswick, Georgia in the late 1940s. In Provincetown, Massachusetts, where the custom started in 1947, the Fourth of July is typically as date and the tradition is rooted in the Portuguese communities. The first Blessing of the Fleet in Australia took place in 1935.

== Ceremony ==
Typically, the boats are cleaned meticulously and decorated with flags before proceeding to the blessing. These vessels are then blessed with Holy Water dispensed from an aspergillum by a priest standing on an auspiciously placed boat while the other boats process by for the blessing. The Catholic Church differentiates between blessings for general boats as well as specifically for fishing boats.

The date of the blessing ceremony is not fixed but most take place typically in either spring or early summer. The ceremony also offers the opportunity to remember those men and women who have died on sea and pray for a successful year of fishing.

== Australia ==
Most states of Australia have had ports and fishing community traditions of blessing the fleet:

- Port Fairy, Victoria.
- Queenscliff, Victoria.
- Stanley, Tasmania.
- Ulladulla, New South Wales.
- Fremantle, Western Australia.

== United States ==
The tradition of the blessing of the fleet is spread along the eastern seaboard and the Great Lakes region.

=== Gulf Coast ===
Annual Blessing of the Fleet festivals are held throughout communities all along the Gulf Coast; each year boats parade down local waters to receive the blessing of the priest before the opening of the shrimp season. The shrimping industry has a long history in the area and has become intrinsically tied to local individual and community identities. 88th Annual Blessing of the Fleet

=== Brunswick ===
Portuguese immigrants introduced the event to their new home in Brunswick, Georgia, around the time of World War II. The blessing is held on Mother's Day to honor Our Lady of Fatima, the patron saint of Portugal, and mothers in the parish. The event begins with a morning mass and the ceremonial "May crowning" of the statue of Our Lady of Fatima, followed by a parishioners parade around Hanover Square, adjacent to the church. The procession is led by a Knights of Columbus honor guard and 8 men carrying the statue. The statue's base is decorated with ferns and fresh red (for living mothers) and white (for deceased mothers) flowers. An anchor made of red and white flowers is also placed at the statue's base.

The celebration then moves to the waterfront, where shrimp trawlers, freshly painted and decorated, circle the waterfront. The "working" boats are usually matched by an equal number of recreational watercraft.

The priest from St. Francis and the Knights of Columbus honor guard board one of the boats and the priest sprinkles Holy water and blesses each boat as it passes by. During the procession, the boats are judged on their decorations, with prizes awarded to the best. After the last boat has been blessed, the boats move up the East River to St. Simons Sound, where the flower anchor is laid upon the water in memory of the local fishermen who perished at sea.

=== Darien ===
Darien, Georgia, has held an annual blessing since 1968. The blessing is held on the Darien River on a Sunday afternoon each spring, but the date varies. It is scheduled to coincide with a falling tide because a rising tide could drive the boats into the bridge—a reminder that they are always at the mercy of the weather. The celebration in Darien begins early in the week with activities that include an evening prayer service, a fishermen's fish fry, and a three-day festival with arts & crafts, food vendors, many families and kid-oriented events, live entertainment and fireworks on Saturday night. Local clerics of various denominations stand ready on the Darien bridge to bless the boats which then turnaround and move down the Darien River and back into the Atlantic to begin the Spring shrimping season.

=== Jacksonville ===
The celebration in Jacksonville, Florida is a simple ceremony that was first held in 1985. While it is held on Palm Sunday, and an Orthodox priest does the blessings, it is a fun, festive boat parade. Some of the participants go overboard with their decorations. Typically, more than 150 vessels participate in the Blessing, ranging from ships to kayaks. This event has also been commemorated in St. Augustine, Florida since 1946.

=== McClellanville ===
McClellanville, SC has held The Lowcountry Shrimp Festival and Blessing of the Fleet annually since 1976. The event is held at the fishing community's Municipal Landing on Jeremy Creek in McClellanville the first Saturday of May each year. The Blessing of the Fleet ceremony is an age-old tradition in which boats parade past the dock where the local clergy pray for a safe and bountiful season. As the clergy give their blessing a beautiful Magnolia Wreath covered with Red Roses is tossed into the water in memory of and to honor McClellanville fishermen. This is typically the time of year the boats are preparing for the opening of the season and are freshly painted, cleaned up and looking their best. The boats decorate for the festival and are usually loaded with people who love to ride in the parade, which is quite picturesque. The remainder of the day is filled with family entertainment, children's games and local seafood dishes, such as boiled and fried shrimp dinners, shrimp kabobs, frog more stew, clam chowder, fish stew, barbecue and more.

=== Mount Pleasant ===
The annual Blessing of the Fleet & Seafood Festival in Mount Pleasant, SC pays tribute to local shrimping and fishing industry, offering a boat parade, live music, craft show and many other activities with the Ravenel Bridge and Charleston Harbor in the background. The festival is held on the last Sunday in April every year. Following the tradition begun by the Magwood family, local shrimpers reinvigorated the festival in 1988. Every year the net proceeds from the festival have been donated to local nonprofit organizations.

=== Portage des Sioux ===
The Blessing of the Fleet in Portage des Sioux, Missouri has a 50+ year history and is held each year on the Third Saturday of July in front of the Shrine of Our Lady of the Rivers.

=== Washington ===
The Blessing of the Fleet in the nation's capital is one of the premier events of the region's boating season. Held in the Spring along Washington, D.C.'s Southwest Waterfront, it is hosted by the Port of Washington Yacht Club and supported by several yacht clubs and marinas in the area. 2011 marked the 36th year that the Blessing has taken place. With activity on land as well as on the water, the event is an exciting display of pageantry and seamanship that draws up to 100 boats each year.

=== Algoma ===
The first Blessing of the Fleet celebration is to be held on the eve of the second anniversary of a large fire that threatened many boats as well as lives of some of the crew. The event is being advertised locally with signs as well as on Facebook. The event will feature a trout boil with a portion of the proceeds benefiting the Algoma Fire Department, and Pastor Chris Jackson will be performing the ceremony. The Blessing of the Fleet is planned to be an annual kick off event, adding to the rich history of Lake Michigan trout and salmon fishing out of the historic port.

=== Aguadilla ===
The city of Aguadilla, Puerto Rico, commemorated its one hundredth anniversary of the Blessing of the Fleet, known locally as El Paseo del Virgen del Carmen, in July 2017. The tradition is an inheritance of Spanish colonialism; in Spain, the patron saint of the fleet is Our Lady of Mount Carmel. The parish of Saint Charles Bartholomew was established in Aguadilla in 1780, adorned by an image of the virgin. In 1917, the first Blessing was initiated by the Augustinian friar Juan de Gorostiza. Festivities include a celebratory mass and procession down the waterfront, followed by a passage of the boats from Aguadilla to a nearby beach.
