= Prinsesse Louise (DAC ship) =

Prinsesse Louise (DAC ship) may refer to:

- Prinsesse Louise (1738 DAC ship), a ship bought by the Danish Asiatic Company in 1738
- Prinsesse Louise (1744 DAC ship), a ship bought by the Danish Asiatic Company in 1744

== See also ==
- Prinsesse Louise Augusta (1784 DAC ship)
