= Es Mal Pas =

- Village
- Location within Spain
- Coordinates: 38°41′9″N 1°26′36″E
- Country: Spain
- Region: Balearic Islands
- Province: Balearic Islands
- Municipality: Formentera
- Time zone: UTC+1 (CET)
  - Summer (DST): UTC+2 (CEST)

Es Mal Pas is a coastal village in Formentera, Balearic Islands, Spain. It is located southeast by road from Ses Bardetes.
