= HDMS Slesvig =

HDMS Slesvig is the name of the following ships of the Royal Danish Navy:

- HDMS Slesvig (1725)
- HDMS Slesvig (1733)
- HDMS Slesvig (1767)
- HDMS Slesvig (1849)

== See also ==
- Slesvig (disambiguation)
