= El Pilar (disambiguation) =

El Pilar is an ancient Maya city on the Belize–Guatemala border

El Pilar may also refer to:

== Geology ==
- El Pilar Fault System, a complex of geological faults in Sucre, northern Venezuela
- El Pilar mine, a large copper mine in Sonora, Mexico

== Buildings ==
- El Pilar de Zaragoza (Cathedral-Basilica of Our Lady of the Pillar), a Catholic church in Zaragoza, Aragon, Spain

== Places ==
- El Pilar de la Mola, a village in Formentera, Balearic Islands, Spain
- El Pilar (Madrid), a ward (barrio) in Madrid, Spain
- El Pilar, Venezuela, a town in Sucre, Venezuela
