= Schleswig (disambiguation) =

Schleswig is an area of southern Jutland, divided between Denmark and Germany, sometimes referred to as Sleswick in English.

Schleswig may also refer to:

== Places ==
- Schleswig, Schleswig-Holstein, a city in Germany
- Schleswig, Iowa, a city in the United States
- Schleswig, Wisconsin, a city in the United States

== Regions ==
- Duchy of Schleswig, a duchy abolished in 1866
- Northern Schleswig, the Danish part of Schleswig
- Southern Schleswig, the German part of Schleswig

== See also ==
- Schleswig-Holstein, a state of Germany
- Slesvig (disambiguation)
