= Cape Barbaria =

Headland of Spain

Coordinates: 38°39′36″N 01°24′00″E

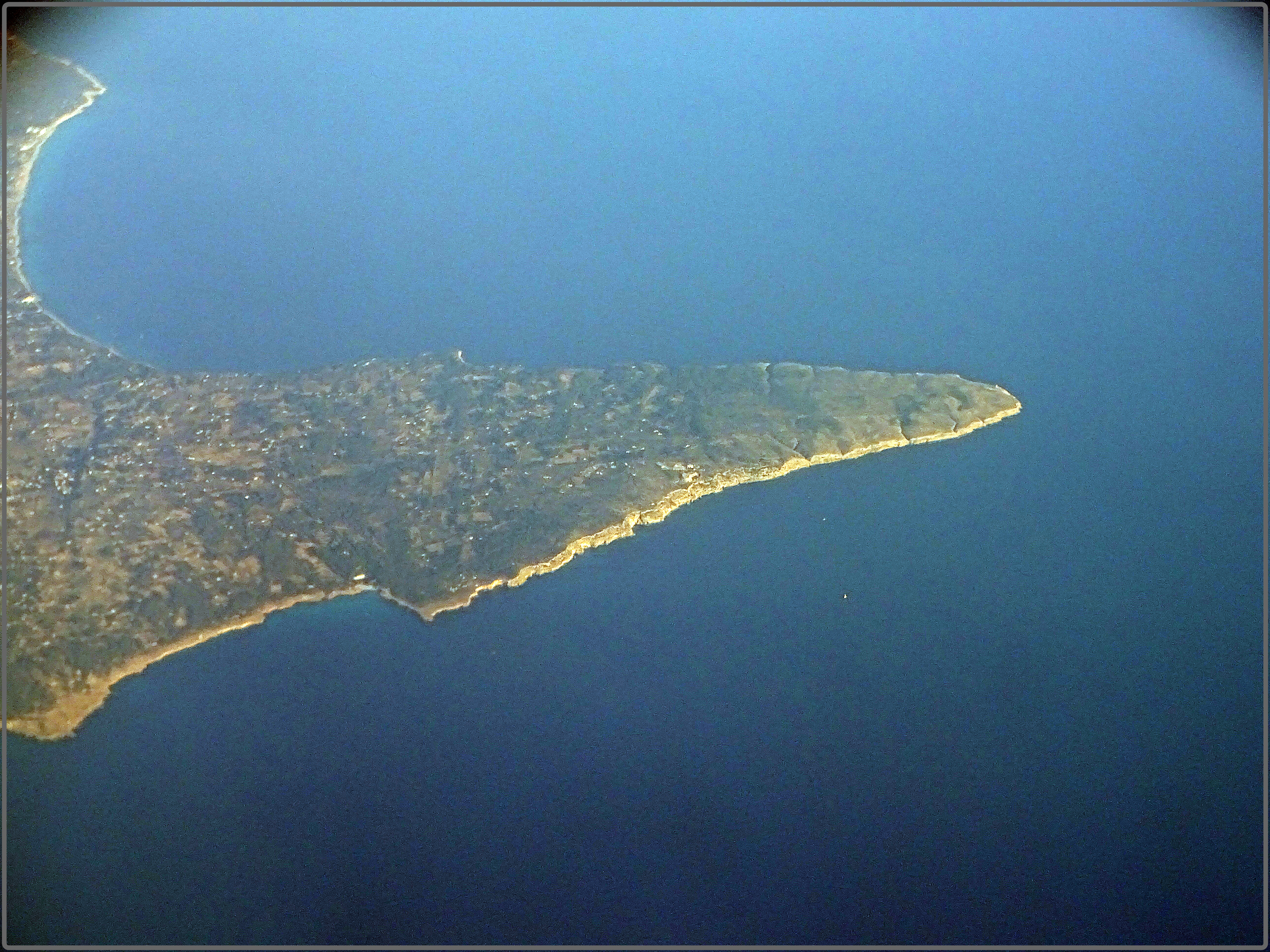
Aerial view of Cape Barbaria from the north-west

Cape Barbaria, or Cap de Barbaria, is a cape that marks the south-western end of the island of Formentera in the Balearic Islands of Spain in the western Mediterranean Sea. The natural vegetation of the cape includes shrubland and small patches of Pinus halepensis and Juniperus phoenicea forest. Human uses of the cape include hunting and agriculture.

== Important Bird Area ==
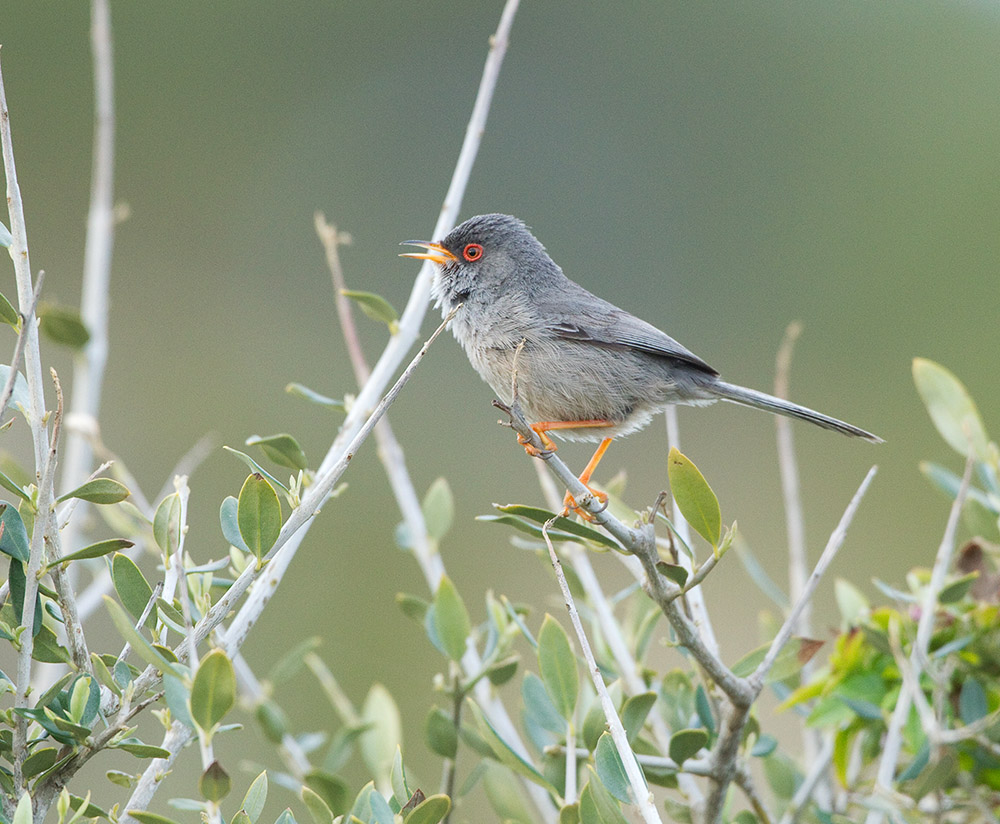
Balearic warblers breed in the IBA

A 100 ha area encompassing the high cliffs and remnant native vegetation of the cape has been designated an Important Bird Area (IBA) by BirdLife International because it supports breeding populations of Balearic shearwaters and Balearic warblers. Yellow-legged gulls also breed at the cape. The main threats to the bird populations come from legal and illegal hunting, the harvesting of shearwater chicks for food, illegal housing, predation by feral cats, and disturbance from tourism activities.
