= La Mola =

Peninsula of Spain

Coordinates: 38°40′09″N 01°33′20″E

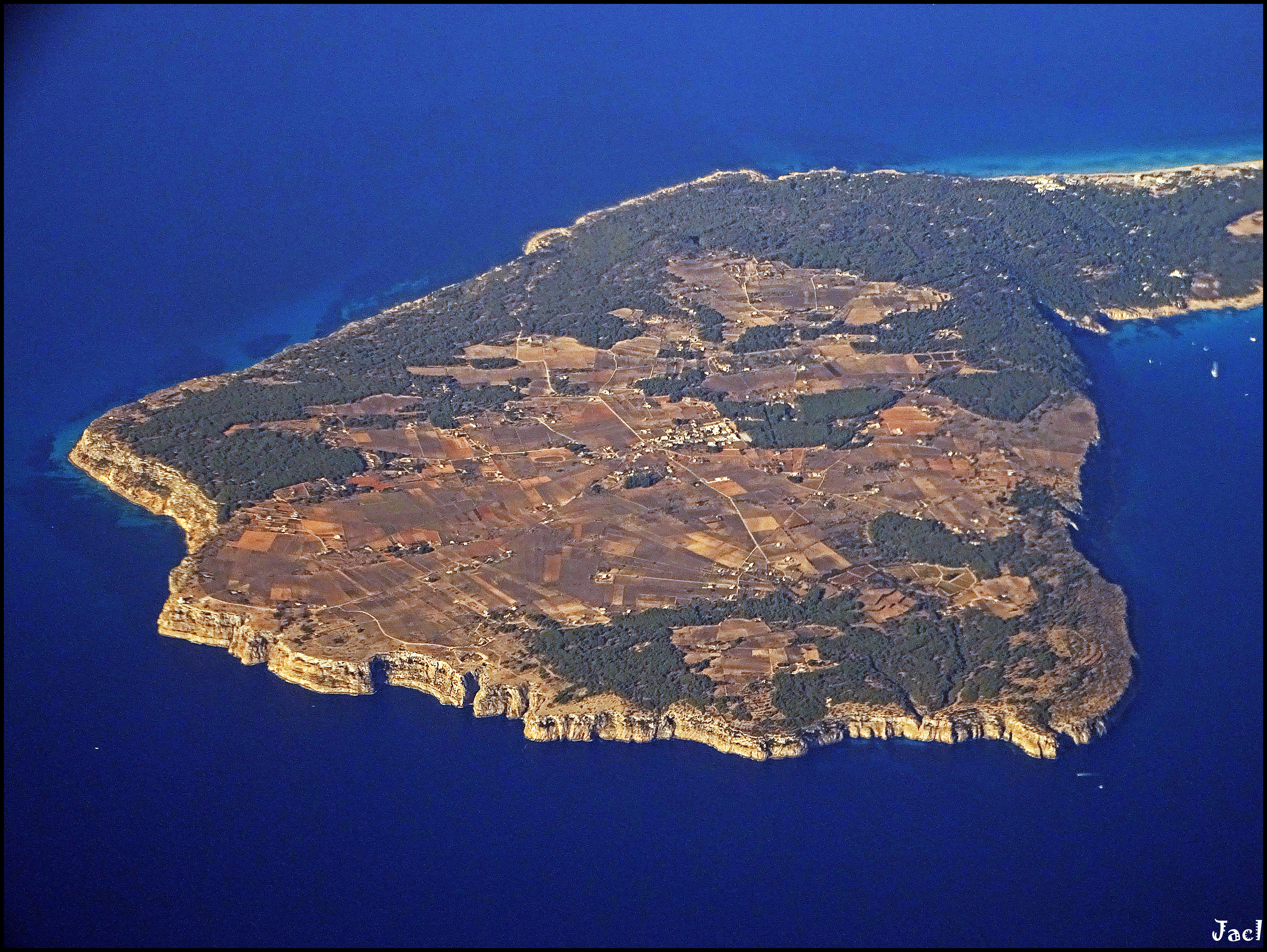
Aerial view of La Mola peninsula from the northeast.

La Mola is a peninsula that forms the eastern end of the island of Formentera, in the Balearic Islands of Spain, in the western Mediterranean Sea. It contains the highest part of the island, with an elevation of about 200 metres (656 feet), as well as the village of El Pilar de la Mola, and is surrounded by high coastal cliffs. The natural vegetation of the peninsula includes native coniferous woodland as well as garrigue and maquis shrubland. The main human uses of the peninsula include hunting and arable agriculture.

== Important Bird Area ==
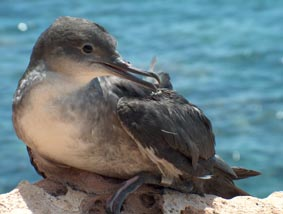
Balearic shearwaters breed in the IBA

An 1,800-hectare (4,448-acre) area encompassing the cliffs and remnant native vegetation of the peninsula has been designated an Important Bird Area (IBA) by BirdLife International because it supports breeding populations of Balearic shearwaters, Audouin's gulls, Balearic warblers, and cliff-nesting raptors. The main threats to the bird populations come from legal and illegal hunting, the harvesting of shearwater chicks for food, illegal housing, predation by feral cats, and disturbance from tourism activities.
