= Sant Ferran de ses Roques =

- Village
- Location within Spain
- Coordinates: 38°42′25.58″N 1°27′30.25″E
- Country: Spain
- Region: Balearic Islands
- Province: Balearic Islands
- Municipality: Formentera
- Time zone: UTC+1 (CET)
  - Summer (DST): UTC+2 (CEST)

Sant Ferran de ses Roques is a village on the island of Formentera, Balearic Islands, Spain, and one of the three parishes of the island.

Sant Ferran is located in the middle of the island, at the crossroads of PM-820, the main road of the island, and PM-820-2, between the towns of Sant Francesc Xavier, Es Pujols, and El Pilar de la Mola.
