= Slesvig =

Slesvig is the Danish name for:

- Schleswig, Schleswig-Holstein, a German city
- The former Duchy of Schleswig (also: Southern Jutland)
- A former name for Hedeby, a Viking Age trading center, originally the largest town in the Nordic countries

== See also ==
- Schleswig (disambiguation)
