= HDMS Slesvig (1725) =

18th century Danish ship

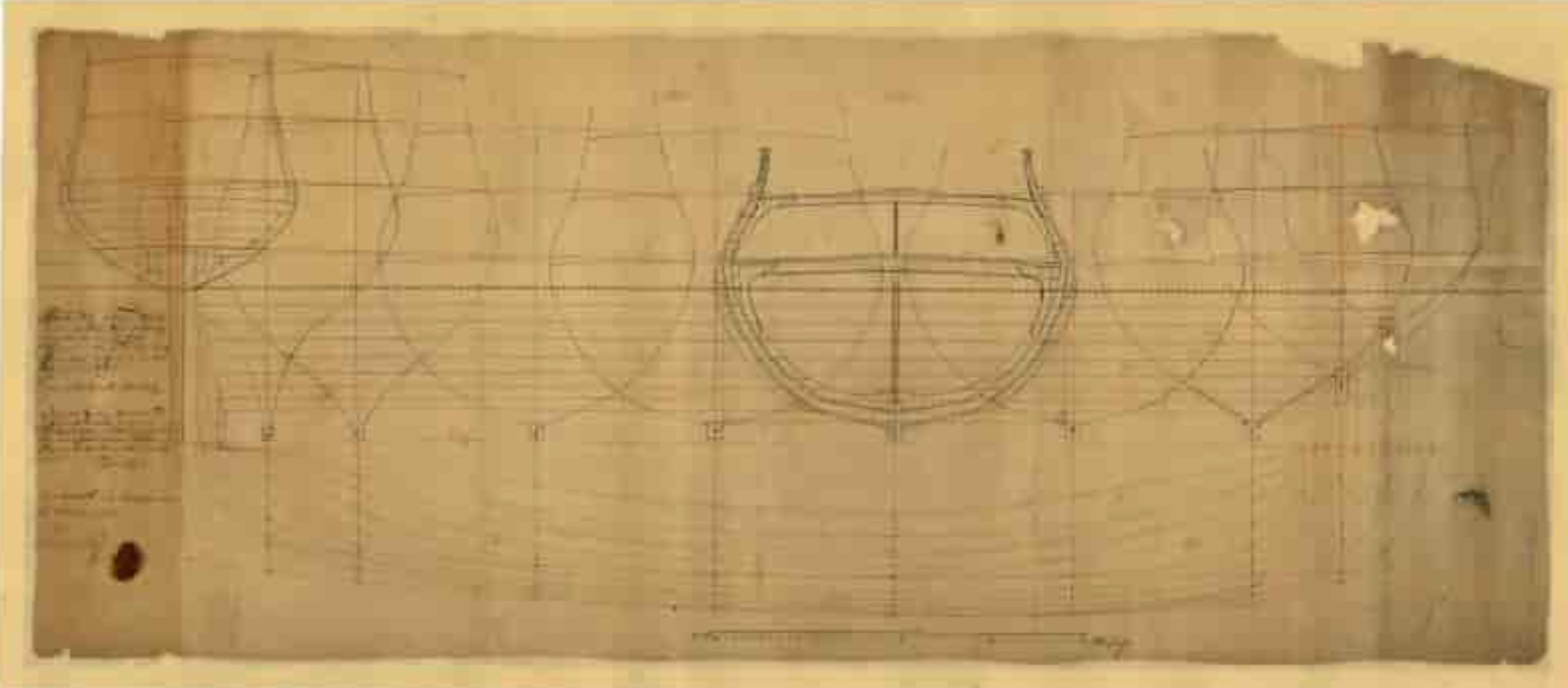

History

Denmark
- Name: Slesvig
- Owner: Royal Danish Navy
- Builder: Royal Danish Naval Dockyard
- Launched: 25 April 1725
- Fate: Transferred to the DAC

Denmark
- Name: Slesvig
- Owner: Danish Asiatic Company
- Acquired: 1732/33
- Fate: Wrecked

General characteristics
- Class & type: Ship of the line
- Complement: 400
- Armament: In Danish service: 54 × 18-pounder guns

HDMS Slesvig (Sleswig) was a ship of the line of the Royal Danish Navy, which she served from 1725. In 1733, she was transferred to the new Danish Asiatic Company.

== Construction and design ==
Slesvig was built at Nyholm to a design by Ole Judichær She was laid down in 1723 and launched on 25 April 1725.

Her complement was 400 men. Her armament was 54 × 18-pounder guns.

== Career ==
=== Naval service ===
In 1726 Slesvig was one of the ships of the line in the Danish squadron that, together with the British, blockaded Reval (modern-day Tallinn). On the return voyage to Copenhagen, she and two other ships became separated from the main squadron in a westerly gale south of Gulland (Gotland).
The next year Juichaer observed sailing trials comparing Slesvig with HDMS Jylland, as Slesvig's sailing qualities were considered substandard. The trials resulted in the shortening of her masts, more ballast and lighter guns – all of which improved Slesvig's performance somewhat, although she was still not a good sailing ship.

Otherwise, HDMS Slesvig had an uneventful career as a naval ship.

=== DAC service ===
Slesvig was transferred to the newly established Danish Asiatic Company in 1732/33. Cron Printz Christian had completed a successful expedition to Canton for the interim company in 1730–31.

1733–35

Guillielmo de Brouwer was appointed as captain of the Slesvig on her first expedition to Canton. He had previously served as second captain of Cron Printz Christian. Zacharias Allewelt (1682–1744) served as chief mate (overstyrmand) on the expedition. Martinus Mundelaer, another Dutchman from Ostende, served as Chief Quarter Master (overkvartersmester). The ship's journal was kept by opløber Lauritz Schultz. Peder Gram, a nephew of later DAC director Hans Gram, served as junior assistant on the expedition. He would later serve as supercargo on six expeditions between 1740 (on board Dronningen af Danmark) and 1767.

Slesvig sailed from Copenhagen on 10 December 1733. She arrived back in Copenhagen on 5 July 1735.

The ship's cargo comprised 688,000 pounds of tea of which 7% (48,000 pounds) was the pacotille of individual members of the crew. Guillielmo de Brouwer was able to sell his pacotille (7.44 m^{3}) for 26,584 Danish rigsdaler. de Brouwer and Brunet were also among the largest buyers when the ship's cargo was sold at auction. They were probably both acting on behalf of Dutch business contacts. It is thus known that Brunet bought 24 crates of tea on behalf of Jacomo de Prets.

1736–38

De Brouwer sailed from Copenhagen on 31 December 1736. Slesvig arrived back in Copenhagen on 20 June 1738.

1738–39

Guillielmo de Brouwer was again appointed as captain of Slesvig on her next expedition to Canton in 1738–39. Philippus de Vos served as second captain on the 1738 expedition.

1741

Guillielmo de Brouwer was succeeded by Philippus de Vos when Slesvig was sent to Canton again in 1741. He had served as second mate of the ship on her previous expedition. The ship journal was kept by mate Johan Otto Rotwitt-

Slesvig sailed from Copenhagen on 17 February 1741. She ran aground shortly after her departure from Copenhagen. She was subsequently sent back to Copenhagen to undergo a thorough inspection and for repairs. She arrived back in Copenhagen on 23 March.

== Fate ==
She wrecked on a voyage from Copenhagen on 39 January 1743, shortly after passing Java.
