= Sant Francesc Xavier =

- Village
- Location within Spain
- Coordinates: 38°42′18″N 1°25′42″E
- Country: Spain
- Region: Balearic Islands
- Province: Balearic Islands
- Municipality: Formentera

Population (2009)
  - Total: 2,790
- Time zone: UTC+1 (CET)
  - Summer (DST): UTC+2 (CEST)

Sant Francesc Xavier or Sant Francesc de Formentera (Spanish: San Francisco Javier) is a village and capital and largest settlement of Formentera, Balearic Islands, Spain. It includes a cultural centre so visitors can learn about the village's history throughout the history of Formentera.

The football team SD Formentera is based in the village.

== Sister towns ==
- - We`a, Djibouti
