= Zacharias Allewelt =

Norwegian sea captain and slave trader (1682–1744)

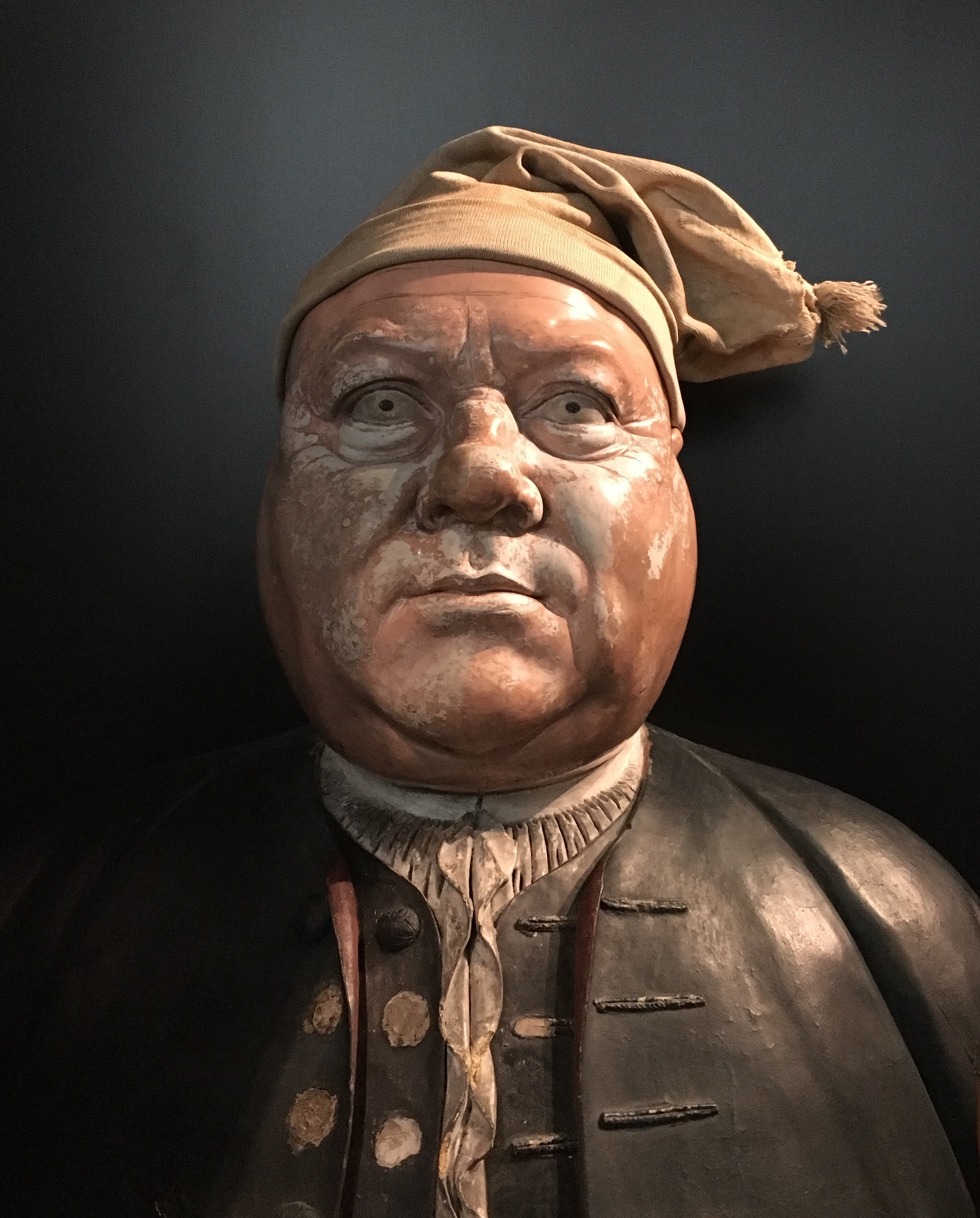
A clay bust of Allewelt

Zacharias Allewelt (1682–1744) was a Norwegian-Danish sea captain and slave trader.

== Early life ==
Allewelt was born in Bergen in 1682.

== Career ==
In 1725, he captained the galiot Den unge Jomfrue when it embarked on a trading voyage to the Guinea region of West Africa, where the slave ship purchased a group of African slaves and then transported them to and sold them in the Danish West Indies. Allewelt also captained the Den unge Jomfrue as it repeated the voyage the next year; in total, he captained six slave-trading voyages.

In the first half of the 1730s, Allewelt went into the service of the Danish Asiatic Company. In 1733, he thus served as chief mate onboard Slesvig on the newly established company's second expedition to Canton. In 1735-38, he served as captain of the company's new ship Kongen af Danmark. He later served as captain of Dronningen af Danmark.

== Personal life and legacy ==
Allewelt married Gjertrud Andersdatter Dahll, a woman from Neskilen, in the village of Eydehavn in 1725. They lived alternately in Copenhagen and Allewelt's farm on Merdø island off the Arendal coast. He died in Copenhagen in 1744.

Allewelt was no doubt instrumental in arranging for his son Andreas Allewelt (1729/1739–1770) to join the Danish Asiatic Company in a very early age. The son sailed nine times to Canton as a company trader. On his first voyage on board the Prinsesse Louise, in 1751, he served as a junior assistant. He later advanced to assistant in 1758, senior assistant in 1760, and finally 3rd supercargo on his final voyage in 1770.

In Canton, Zacharias Allewelt commissioned local "face-makers" to create two life-size clay busts of him; one is now kept at the Aust-Agder Cultural History Center in Arendal, Norway, and the other is located at the M/S Maritime Museum of Denmark in Helsingør.
