= El Pilar de la Mola =

- Village
- Location within Spain
- Coordinates: 38°40′9″N 1°33′19″E
- Country: Spain
- Region: Balearic Islands
- Province: Balearic Islands
- Municipality: Formentera
- Time zone: UTC+1 (CET)
  - Summer (DST): UTC+2 (CEST)

El Pilar de la Mola is a village in Formentera, Balearic Islands, Spain. It lies on the La Mola peninsula, the highest point on the island, and has a good view of Formentera.
