= La Savina =

- Village
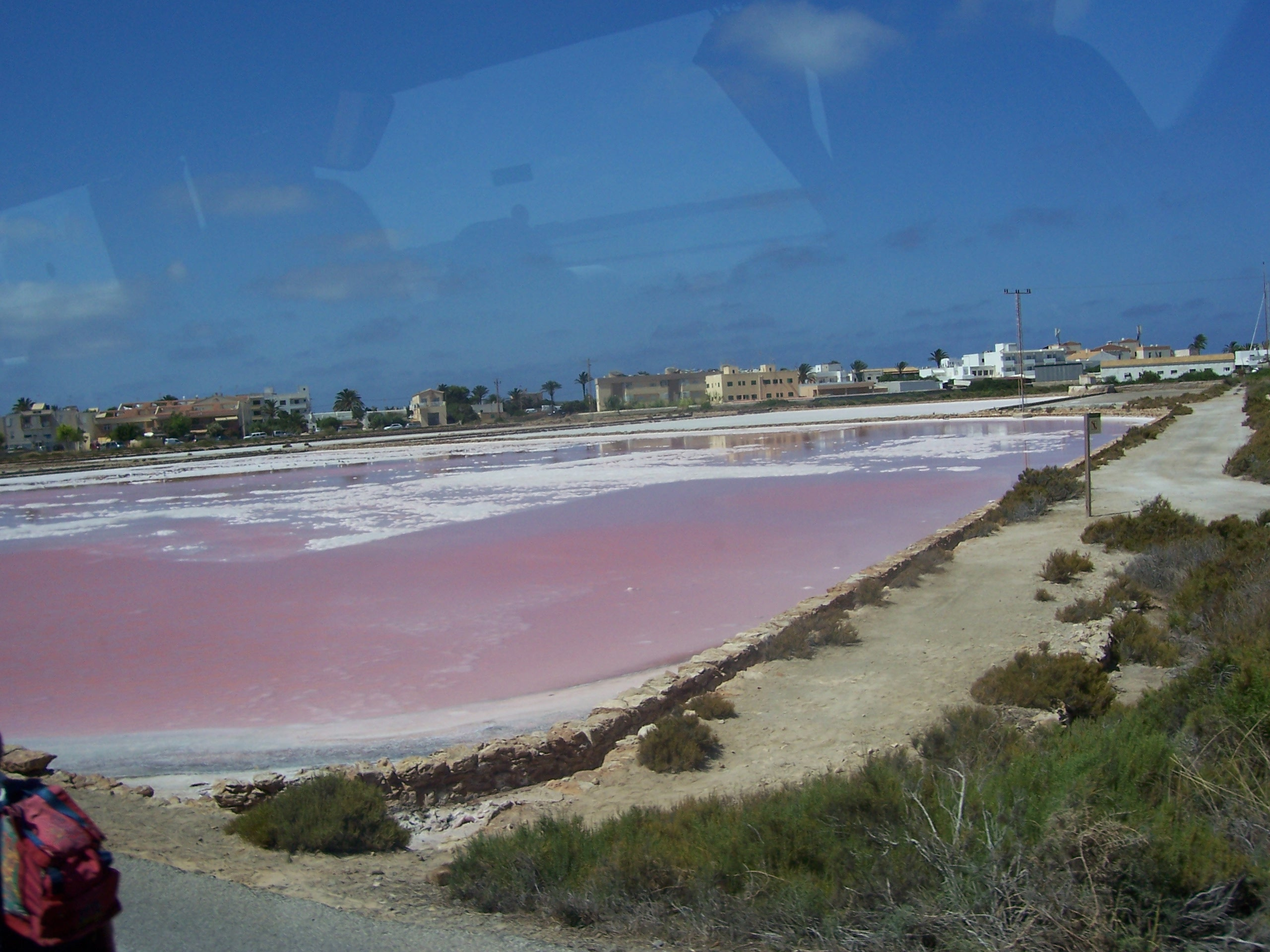
- La Savina.

- Location within Spain
- Coordinates: 38°44′0″N 1°25′5″E
- Country: Spain
- Region: Balearic Islands
- Province: Balearic Islands
- Municipality: Formentera
- Time zone: UTC+1 (CET)
  - Summer (DST): UTC+2 (CEST)

La Savina or La Sabina is a port village in Formentera, on the Balearic Islands, off eastern Spain.

The Far de la Savina lighthouse is located nearby on the island.

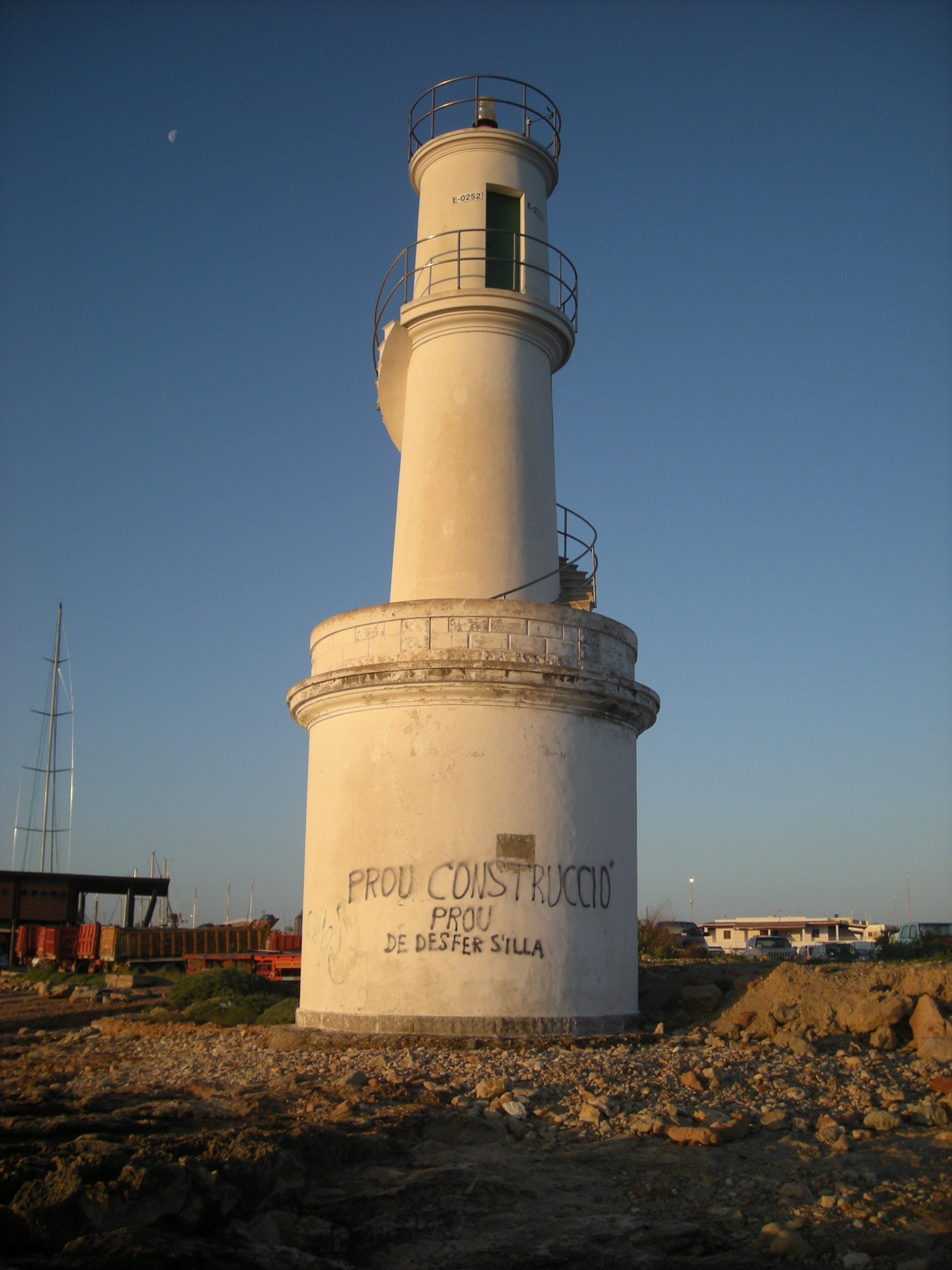
Far de la Savina (lighthouse)
