= Formentera =

Spanish island in the Balearic Islands

- Flag of Formentera

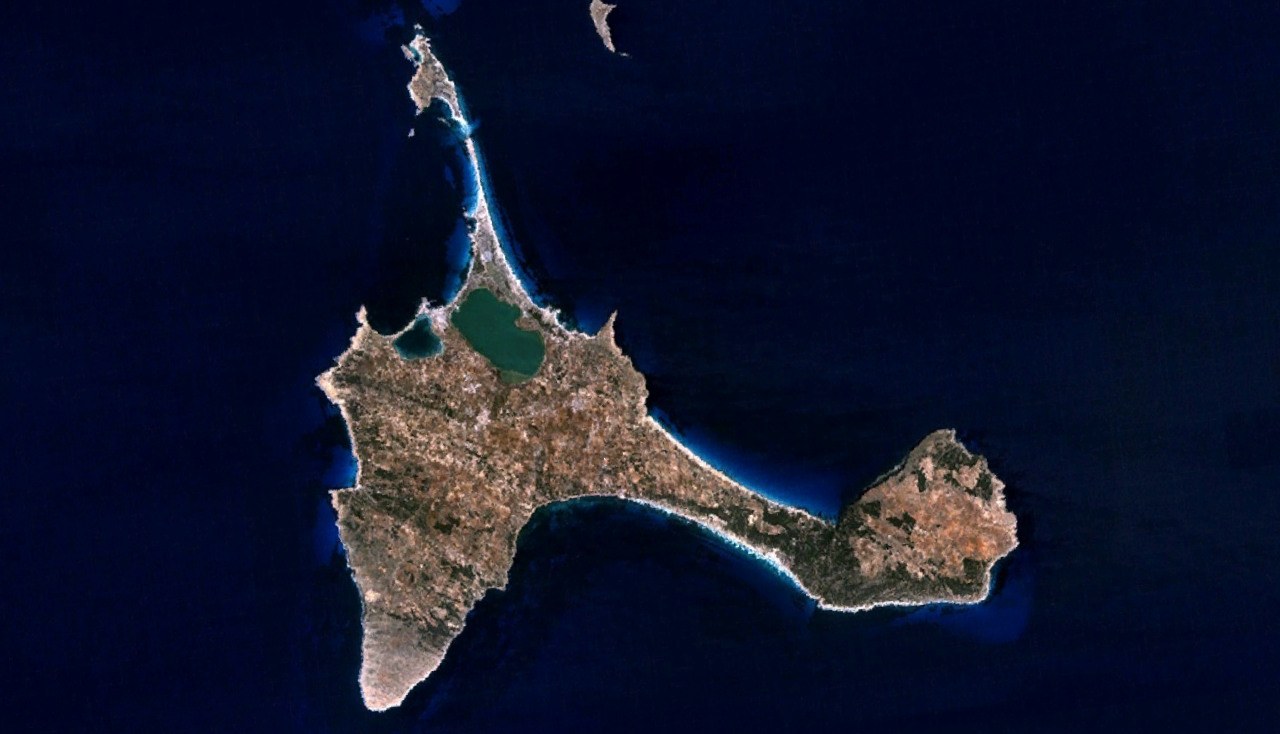
- Satellite view (2006)

- Location within Balearic Islands Location within Spain

Geography
- Location: Mediterranean Sea
- Coordinates: 38°42′N 1°27′E
- Archipelago: Pityuses, Balearic Islands
- Area: 83.24 km^{2} (32.14 sq mi)
- Highest elevation: 119 m (390 ft)
- Highest point: La Mola

Administration
- Spain
- Autonomous community: Balearic Islands
- Largest settlement: Sant Francesc Xavier
- Government: Island Council of Formentera
- President: Òscar Portas (Sa Unió)

Demographics
- Population: 11,389 (Estimate 1 January 2023)
- Pop. density: 136.8/km^{2} (354.3/sq mi)

Additional information
- Official languages: Catalan, Spanish

Formentera (Balearic Catalan: [fuɾmənˈteɾə], Spanish: [foɾmenˈteɾa]) is a Spanish island located in the Mediterranean Sea, which belongs to the Balearic Islands autonomous community together with Mallorca, Menorca, and Ibiza.

Formentera is the smallest and most southerly island of the Pityusic Islands group (comprising Ibiza and Formentera itself, as well as various small islets). It covers an area of 83.24 square kilometres (32.14 sq mi), including offshore islets. At the 2011 Census, the population was 10,583; according to the Census of 1 January 2021, it counted 11,891 inhabitants, while the official estimate at 1 January 2023 was 11,389.

== History ==
The island's name is said to derive from the Latin word frumentarium, meaning "granary". The island was occupied in prehistoric times, going back to 2,000–1,600 BC. Archaeological sites from that period remain in Ca na Costa, Cap de Barbaria (multiple sites) and Cova des Fum. The island had been occupied by the Carthaginians before passing to the ancient Romans. In succeeding centuries, it passed to the Visigoths, the Byzantines, the Vandals, and the Arabs. In 1109, Formentera was the target of a devastating attack by the Norwegian king Sigurd I at the head of the Norwegian Crusade. The island was conquered by James I the Conqueror, added to the Crown of Aragon and later became part of the medieval Kingdom of Majorca.

Formentera coat of arms

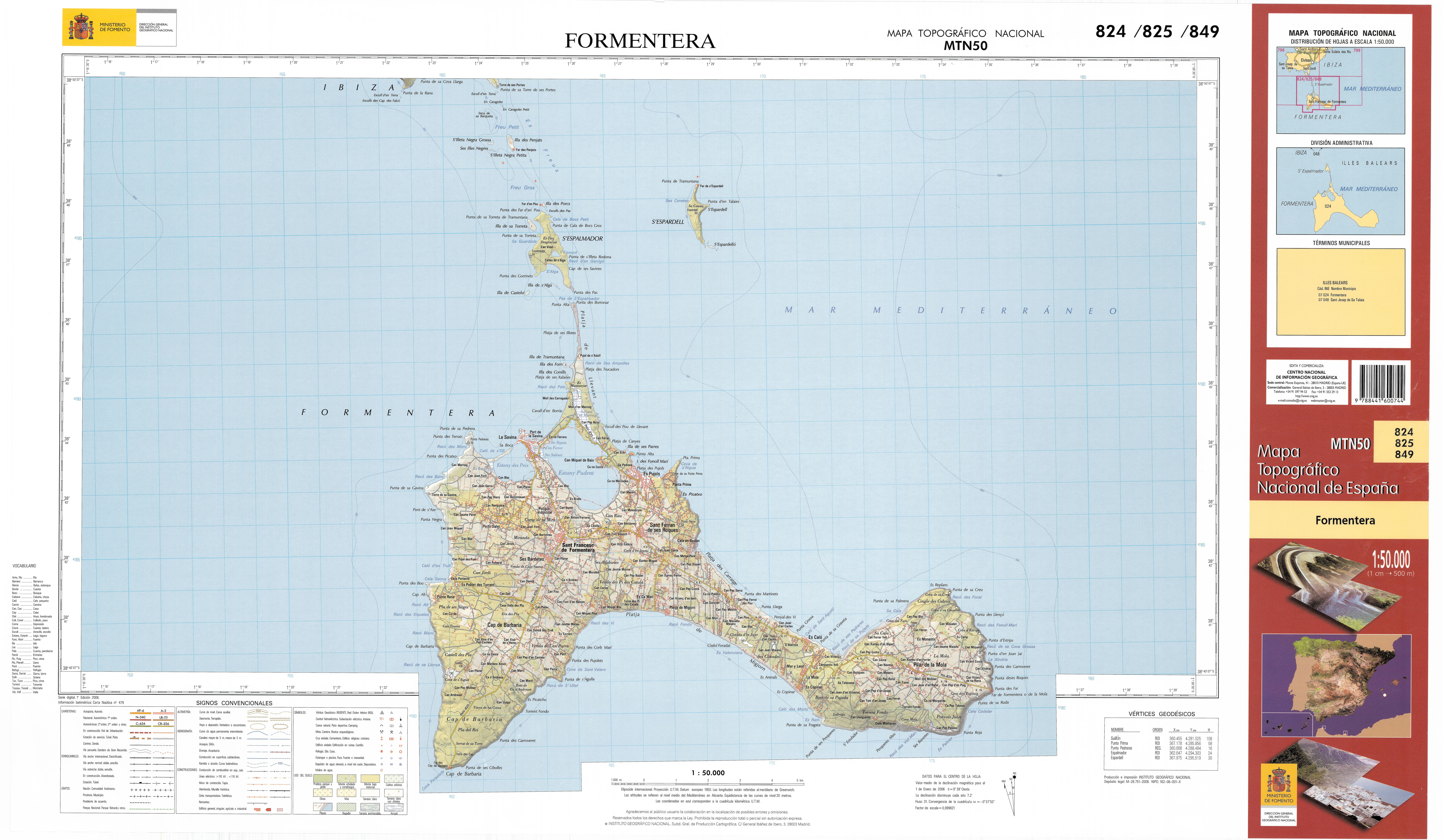
Map of the island of Formentera

Map of Formentera's véndes

From 1403 to the early 18th century, the threat of Barbary pirate attacks rendered the island uninhabitable. On 17 June 1651, during the Franco-Spanish War (1635–1659), a squadron of Spanish galleys under John of Austria the Younger captured the French galleon Lion Couronné off this island.

The island and its surrounding islets became a separate insular council with the same territory as the eponymous municipality after 1977. Before that, it was administered in the former insular council of Ibiza and Formentera (covering the whole group of the Pityusic Islands), but in a separate comarca which already covered the current municipality of Formentera. This reform allowed Ibiza to unify its comarca of five municipalities with its new insular council, no longer administering Formentera.

== Geography ==
The main island of Formentera is 19 kilometres (12 mi) long and is located about 6 kilometres (4 mi) south of Ibiza in the Mediterranean Sea. More specifically Formentera is part of the delimitation of the Balearic Sea, which is a northwestern element of the Mediterranean Sea. Its major villages are Sant Francesc Xavier, Sant Ferran de ses Roques, El Pilar de la Mola (on the La Mola peninsula), La Savina, and Es Pujols, the most important tourist destination of the island.

Formentera comprises one municipality, also called Formentera, and had a population of 11,981 (as of 1 January 2021). Its land area is 83.24 km^{2} (32.14 sq mi). It is subdivided into several civil parishes (parròquies), themselves subdivided into vendas (véndes in Catalan).

North of Formentera is located Espalmador (in Catalan: Illa de S'Espalmador), the second largest island of the Pitiusas Islands, surrounded by a few minor islets.

Espalmador is a tombolo, separated from the main island of Formentera by a shallow sandbar. This area is a popular stopping point for those in yachts heading between Ibiza and Formentera.

=== Climate ===
Formentera has a semi-arid climate with hot, very dry summers and warm, dry winters. The flat topography of the island means that rainfall is scarce and the temperature is quite uniform. The average annual rainfall is 370–420 mm. The average annual temperature is between 17 and 18 °C. Overall, the climate is mild, with an average annual temperature of 18.6 degrees Celsius and 2883 hours of annual sunshine on average.

Climate data for Formentera 119m amsl
Month	Jan	Feb	Mar	Apr	May	Jun	Jul	Aug	Sep	Oct	Nov	Dec	Year
Mean daily maximum °C (°F)	15 (59)	16 (61)	17 (63)	19 (66)	22 (72)	26 (79)	29 (84)	30 (86)	28 (82)	24 (75)	19 (66)	16 (61)	22 (71)
Daily mean °C (°F)	12 (54)	12 (54)	13 (55)	15 (59)	18 (64)	22 (72)	25 (77)	26 (79)	24 (75)	20 (68)	16 (61)	13 (55)	18 (64)
Mean daily minimum °C (°F)	8 (46)	8 (46)	9 (48)	11 (52)	14 (57)	17 (63)	21 (70)	21 (70)	19 (66)	16 (61)	12 (54)	9 (48)	14 (57)
Average precipitation mm (inches)	35 (1.4)	30 (1.2)	40 (1.6)	35 (1.4)	25 (1.0)	15 (0.6)	5 (0.2)	25 (1.0)	40 (1.6)	65 (2.6)	50 (2.0)	55 (2.2)	420 (16.8)
Average precipitation days	6	5	6	6	5	3	1	3	4	5	6	6	56
Source: Climates to travel

== Administration ==
=== Insular government ===
Elections are held every four years concurrently with local elections. From 1983 to 2007, councilors were indirectly elected from the results of the election to Parliament of the Balearic Islands for the constituencies of Ibiza and Formentera (then forming a single Island council, with Formentera sending a single councilor to both Parliament and the Island council). Since 2007, however, separate direct elections are held to elect the Island Council of Formentera, with currently 17 seats (it only sends a single one to the Balearic Parliament).

==== Results of the elections to the former Island Council of Ibiza and Formentera ====
Island Councilors of the Island Council of Ibiza and Formentera between 1978 and 2007
Key to parties EVIB COP Pacte PSIB–PSOE FIEF CDS PDL UCD AIPF PP ICIF–CD CP AP–PL
Election	Distribution	President
1979	2 / 4 / 6	Cosme Vidal Juan (ICIF–CD, CP)
1983	5 / 1 / 6	Cosme Vidal Juan (ICIF–CD, CP)
1987	5 / 1 / 7	Antoni Marí (PP)
1991	5 / 1 / 7	Antoni Marí (PP)
1995	1 / 4 / 1 / 7	Antoni Marí (PP)
1999	1 / 6 / 6	Pilar Costa (Pacte Progressista)
2003	5 / 1 / 7	Pere Palau (PP)
Split into the Island Councils of Ibiza and Formentera respectively, with the 2007 Amendment of the Statue of Autonomy coming into effect.

==== Results of the elections to the Island Council of Formentera ====
Island Councilors of the Island Council of Formentera since 2007
Key to parties GxF PSIB–PSOE CompromísFormentera GUIF Sa Unió PP Vox
Election	Distribution	President
2007	5 / 2 / 2 / 4	Jaume Ferrer Ribas (GxF)
2011	6 / 2 / 5	Jaume Ferrer Ribas (GxF)
2015	9 / 2 / 2 / 4	Jaume Ferrer Ribas (GxF)
2019	6 / 5 / 6	Alejandra Ferrer (GxF) (2019-2021)
2019	6 / 5 / 6	Ana Juan (PSIB–PSOE) (2021-2023)
2023	5 / 3 / 9	Llorenç Córdoba (Sa Unió, Independent) (2023–2024)
2023	5 / 3 / 1 / 8	Llorenç Córdoba (Sa Unió, Independent) (2023–2024)
2023	5 / 3 / 1 / 8	Òscar Portas (Sa Unió) (2024–)

== Attractions ==
Since the 1960s, Formentera has been a popular destination for hippies. Formentera is renowned across Europe for many pristine white beaches and the fact that nude sunbathing is allowed on most of its beaches.

Throughout its history, Formentera has had many legends, written in novels by writers such as Jules Verne, and in songs by artists as varied as Gilberto Gil, Pink Floyd, and King Crimson. The annual Formentera Jazz Festival has been held annually in early June and features musicians from the local and international scene.

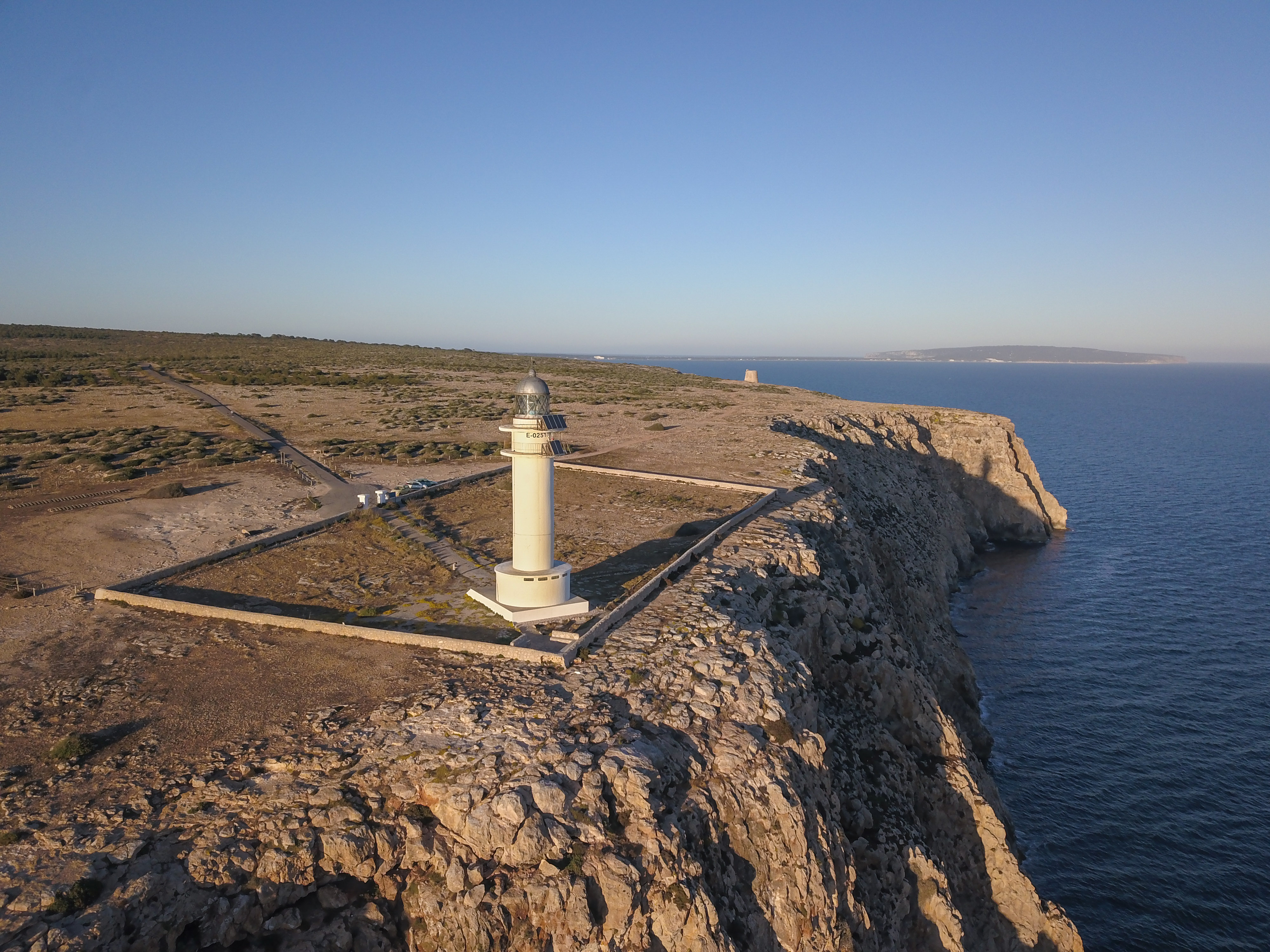
Cap de Barbaria Lighthouse

The Canadian writer Patrick Roscoe was born in Formentera. Joni Mitchell wrote her 1971 album Blue on the island while Bob Dylan once slept on the Far de la Mola on the island. Author Matt Haig also writes about visiting the island often in his twenties in Reasons to Stay Alive. The opening track of the King Crimson album Islands, Formentera Lady, is named after the island. James Taylor also worked on his hit song Carolina in My Mind on holiday from recording with Apple Records, though he began writing it in London and completed it on the nearby island of Ibiza.

The Cap de Barbaria Lighthouse plays a pivotal role in Julio Medem's 2001 Spanish film, Sex and Lucia (Lucía y el sexo), which was filmed on the island and served as a touchstone for the various characters' interwoven relationships.

Although paved roads allow access to all parts of the island and cars are easily hired in the port, many people choose to rent mopeds or even bicycles due to the flat nature of most of the island and the availability of dedicated cycle tracks in many locations.

The island also has four Martello towers.

== Transport ==
With no airports, the island was formerly reachable only by boat from Ibiza, making it the quieter of the two islands, but in recent years regular passenger service from the Spanish mainland has increased tourism.

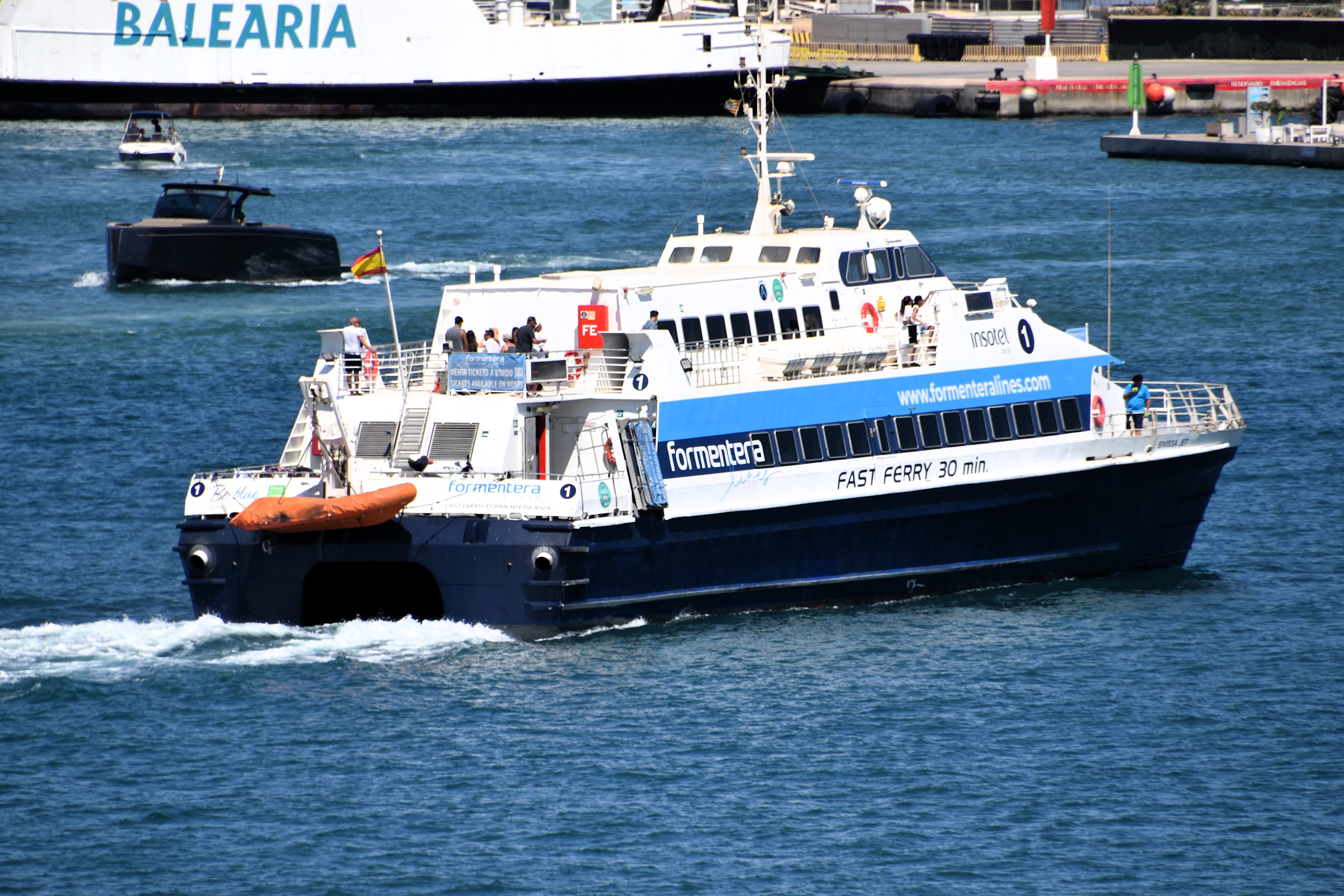
Ferry from Formentera to the port of Ibiza

Ferry tickets from Ibiza are available in advance, as are transfers from Ibiza airport or port directly to accommodation in Formentera.

Ferries to Formentera operate from their own terminal in Ibiza port, with departures every half hour in high season on large (200+ passenger) fast catamarans. The journey takes approximately 30 minutes comprising 10 minutes leaving Ibiza, 10 minutes crossing the sea, and 10 minutes arriving in Formentera past the isthmus to Espalmador.

Some of the anchorages may not be suitable for sailboats under less than ideal circumstances.

There is a regular bus service on the island. During high season it comprises 5 routes, which connect the port with major settlements like Sant Francesc, Es Pujols, Sant Ferran, Pilar de la Mola and popular beaches including Ses Illetes, Migjorn, and Cala Saona. During winter only the L2 route remains operational, with additional detour to serve Es Pujols.

== Culture ==
A local Ibizan (eivissenc) variant of the Balearic dialect of the Catalan language is spoken in Formentera. While the official languages are Catalan and Spanish, other major languages like English, Italian, German, French and Dutch can also be heard extensively in the summer due to mass tourism.

== Sports ==
From 1 September to 7 September, Formentera hosted the 2007 Techno 293 OD World Championships in windsurfing for juniors under 15 and youths under 17.

== Villages ==
- Es Mal Pas

== Gallery ==
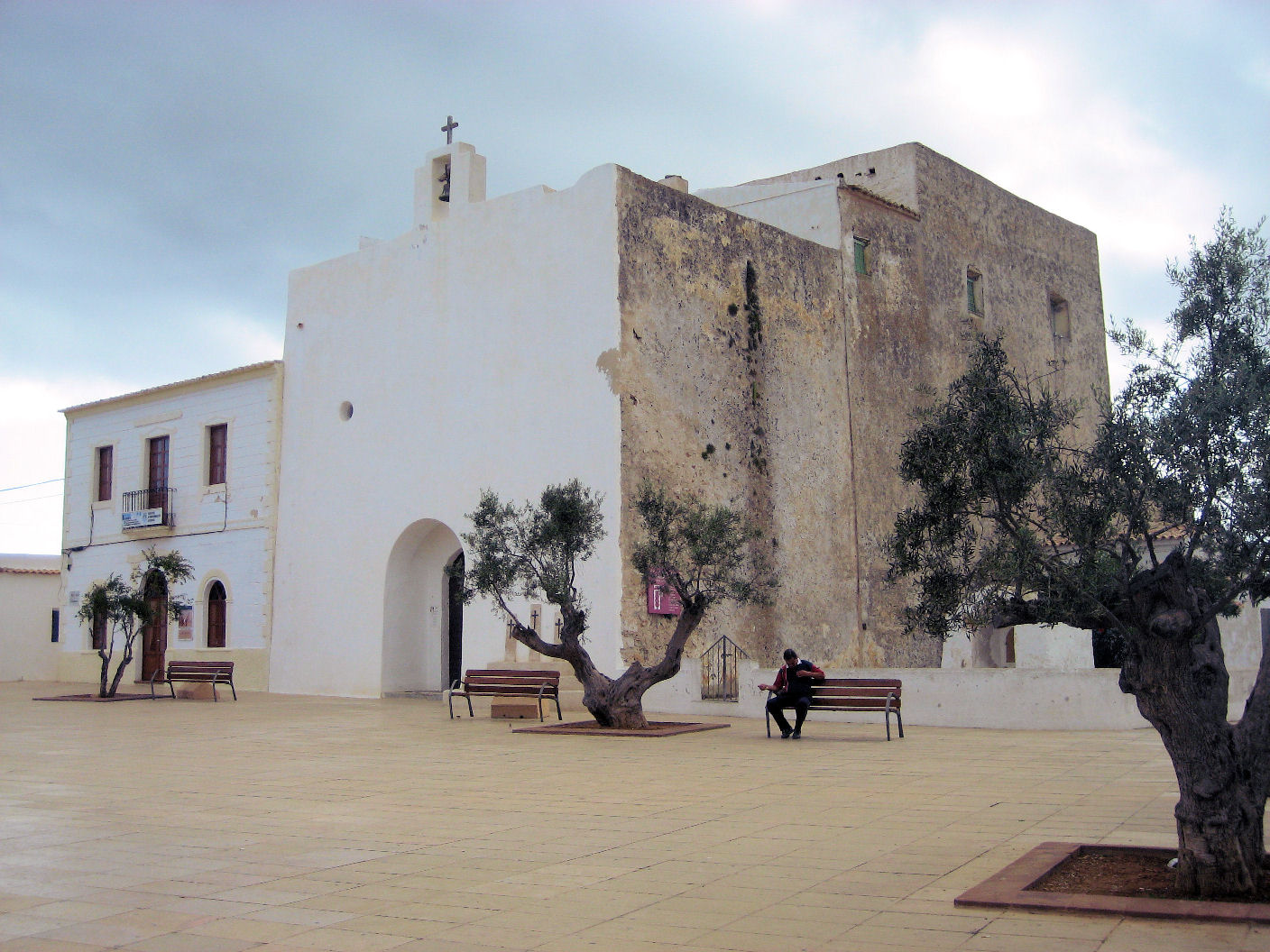
Church in Sant Francesc

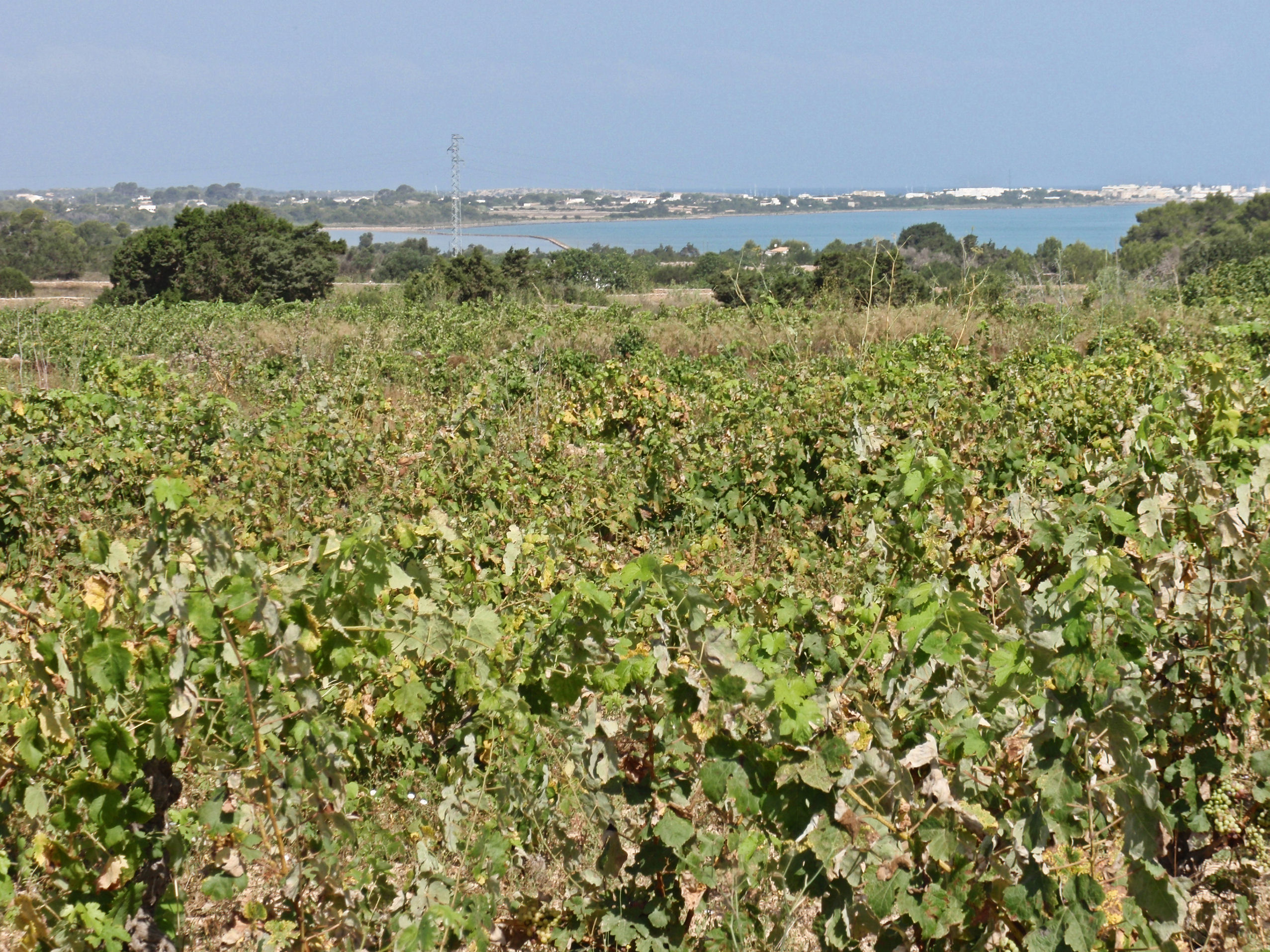
Vineyards

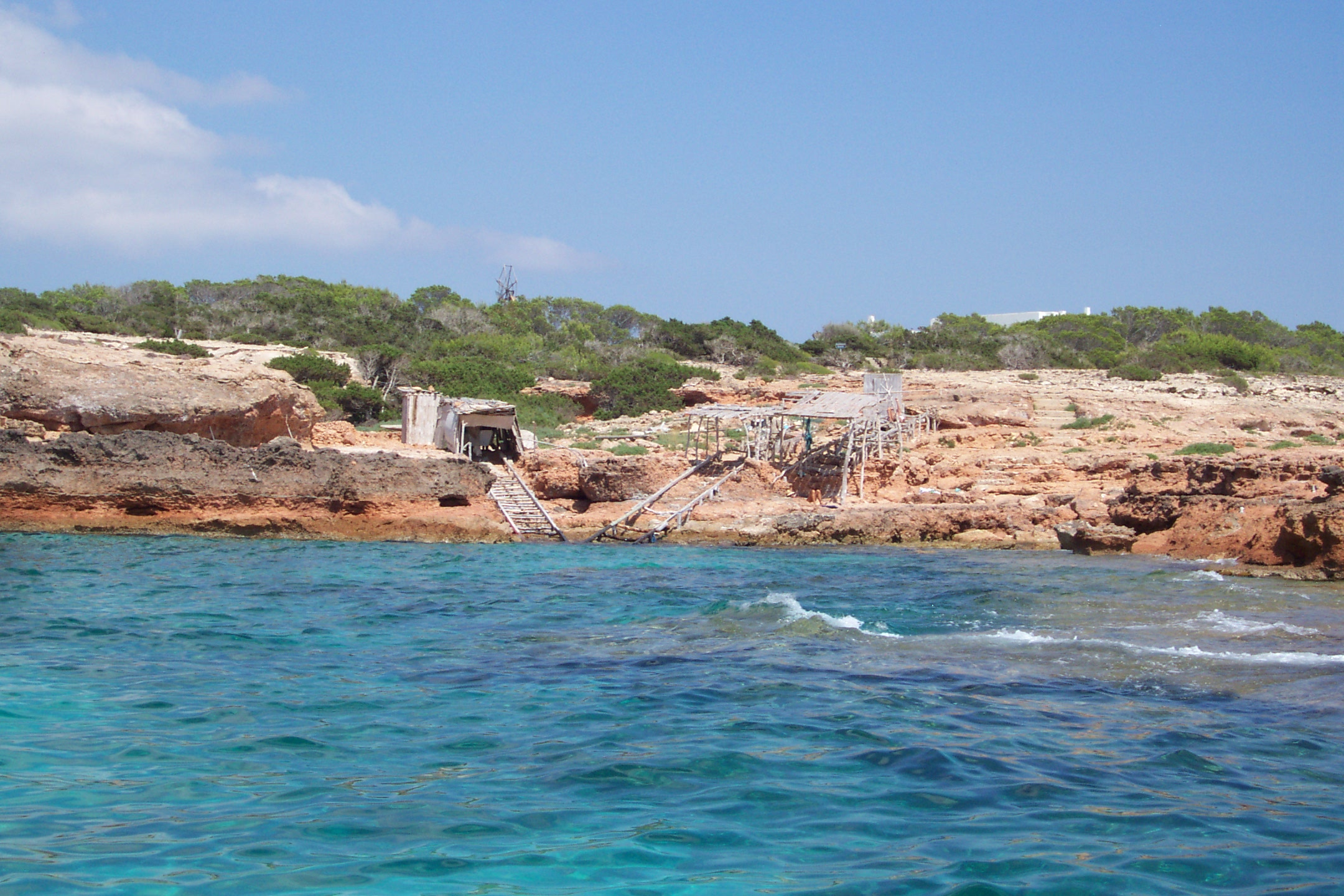
The coastline near Cala Saona

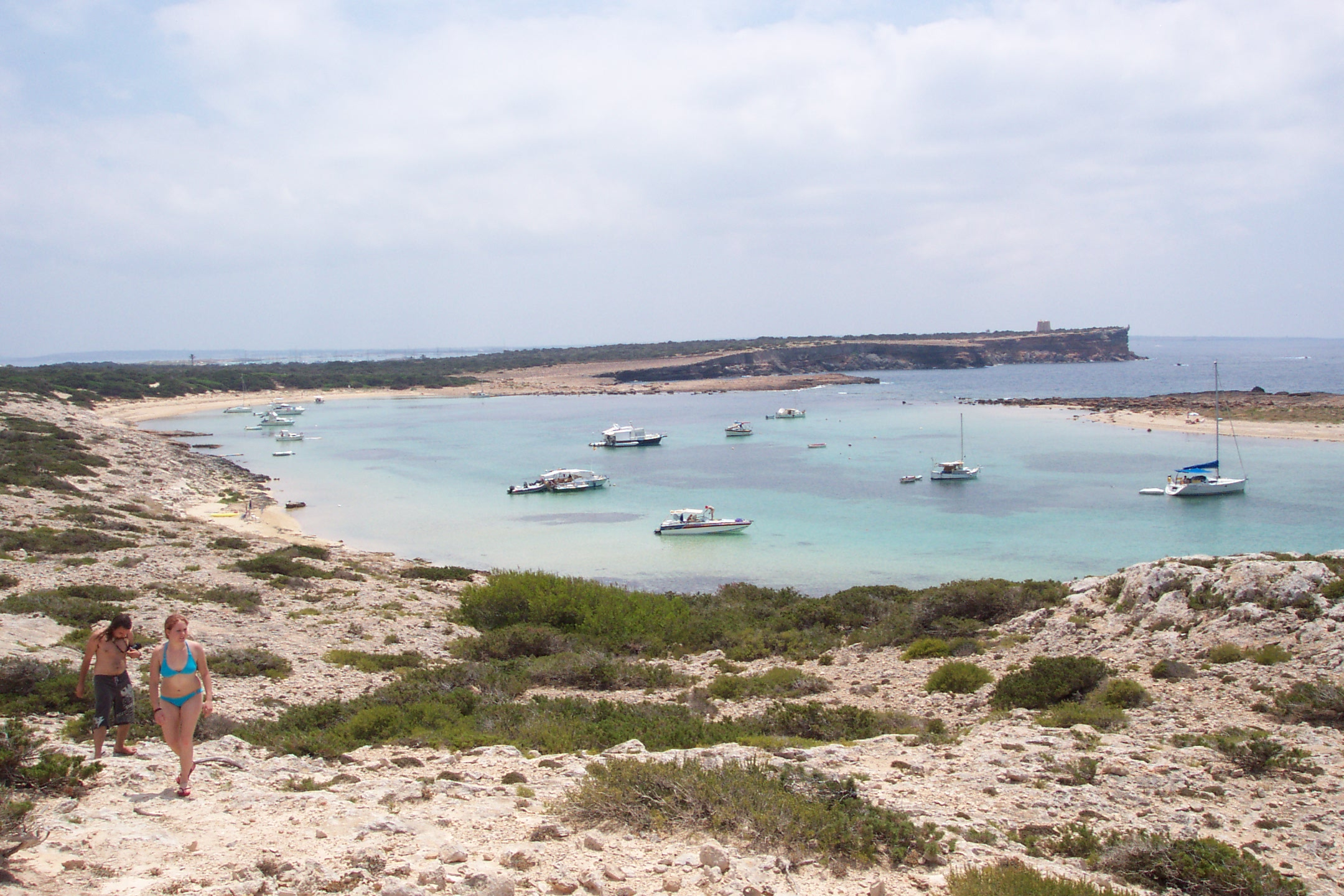
Island of Espalmador

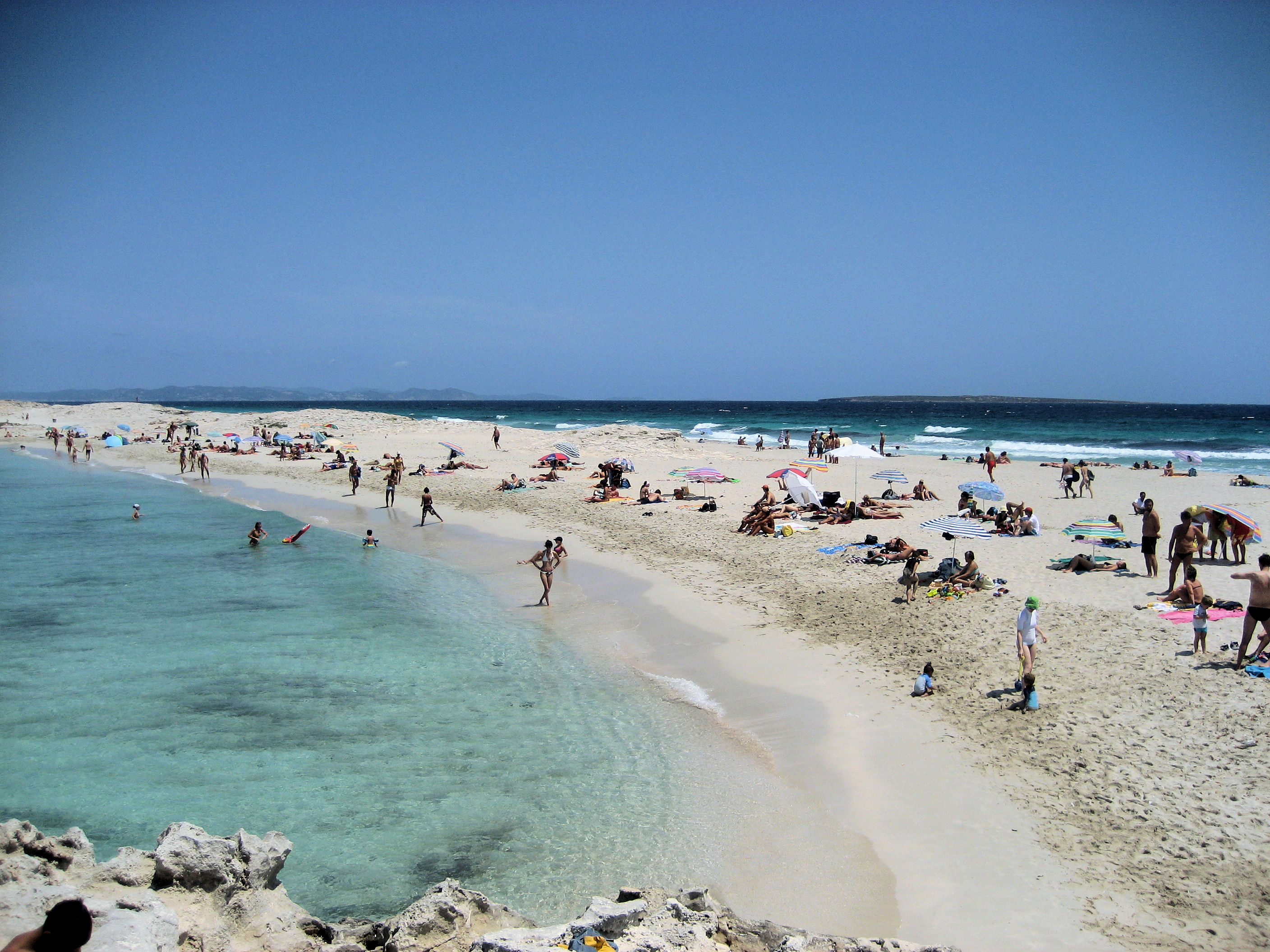
Trucadors Beach
