= Ses Balandres =

Cove in Ibiza, Spain

- Beach
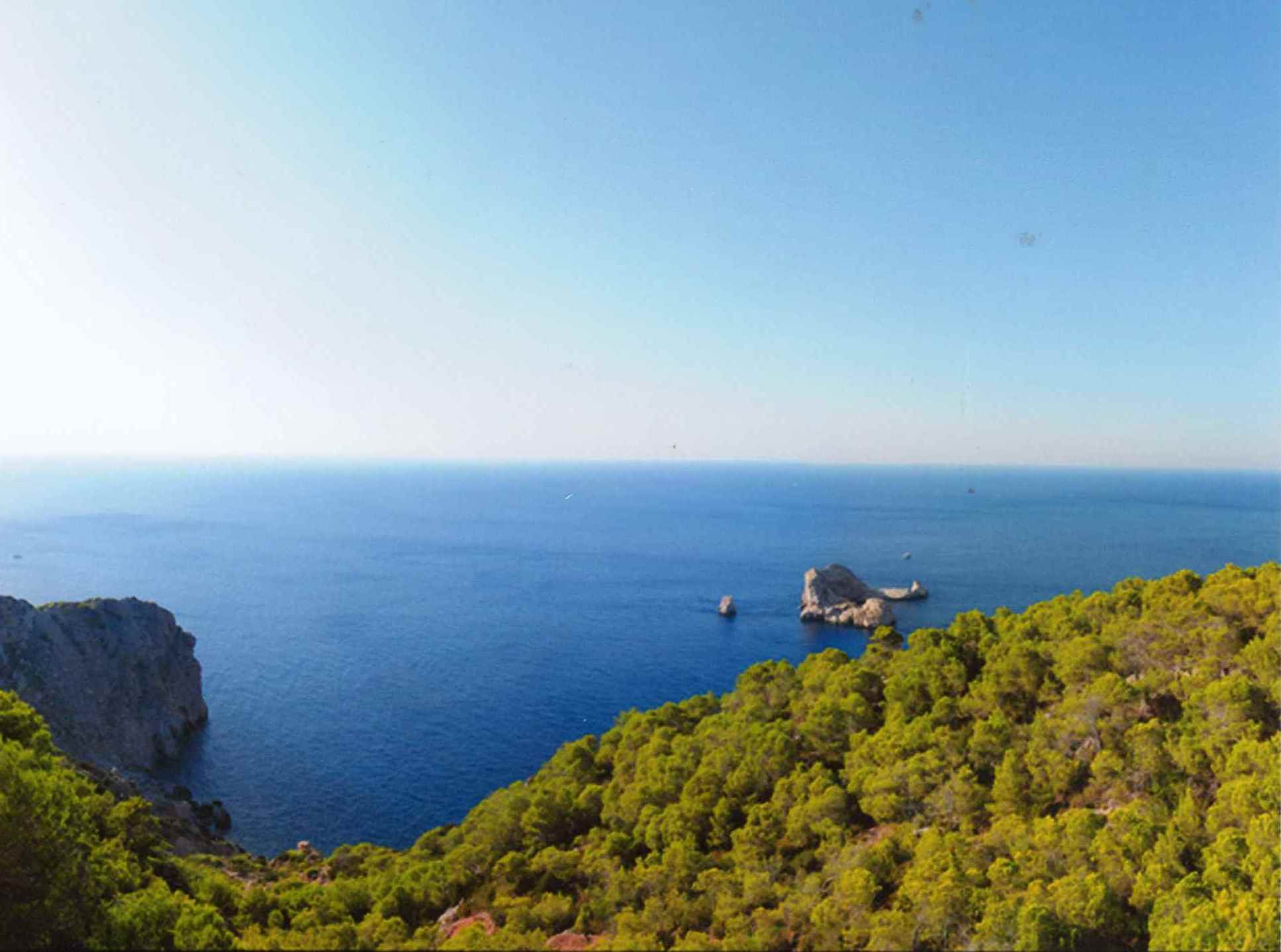
- The Cove of Ses Balandres, viewed from the cliff top with the small islands of Ses Margalides

- Location of Ses Balandres on Ibiza
- Coordinates: 39°2′56″N 1°19′35″E
- Location: Sant Antoni de Portmany, Ibiza, Spain

Ses Balandres is a rocky cove with a very small beach on the western seaboard of the Spanish island of Ibiza. It is 1.2 miles (1.9 km) directly north of the village of Santa Agnès de Corona within the municipality of Sant Antoni de Portmany.

== Description ==
The beach in this rocky cove is probably the most difficult beach to access on the whole of the island. To reach it you must negotiate a rickety wooden ladder and then clamber down a rocky slope with the help of a rope installed by the local fishermen. This route was christened Heaven’s Gate by Hippies in years gone by. Visitors will understand why once they have made this tricky descent as the cove is a secluded, spectacular place. Once at the shoreline the horseshoe shaped cove’s cliffs tower above the very small strip of sand and pebbles. The rock formations in the cliff face are in layers which were formed by layers of sediment laid down between 65 and 195 million years. Surprisingly, given the difficulty in getting here, local fishermen have built sheds and slipways here, by building simple walls across the natural caves at the base of these cliffs.

=== Ses Margalides ===
Just of the shoreline in the middle of the cove are the rocks of Ses Margalides. The rocks have formed a low sea arch, a popular place for diving. Stronger swimmers can swim out to the rocks, but only in good calm sea conditions.
