= Cala d'Albarca =

Cove on Ibiza, Spain

Cala d’Albarca
- Beach
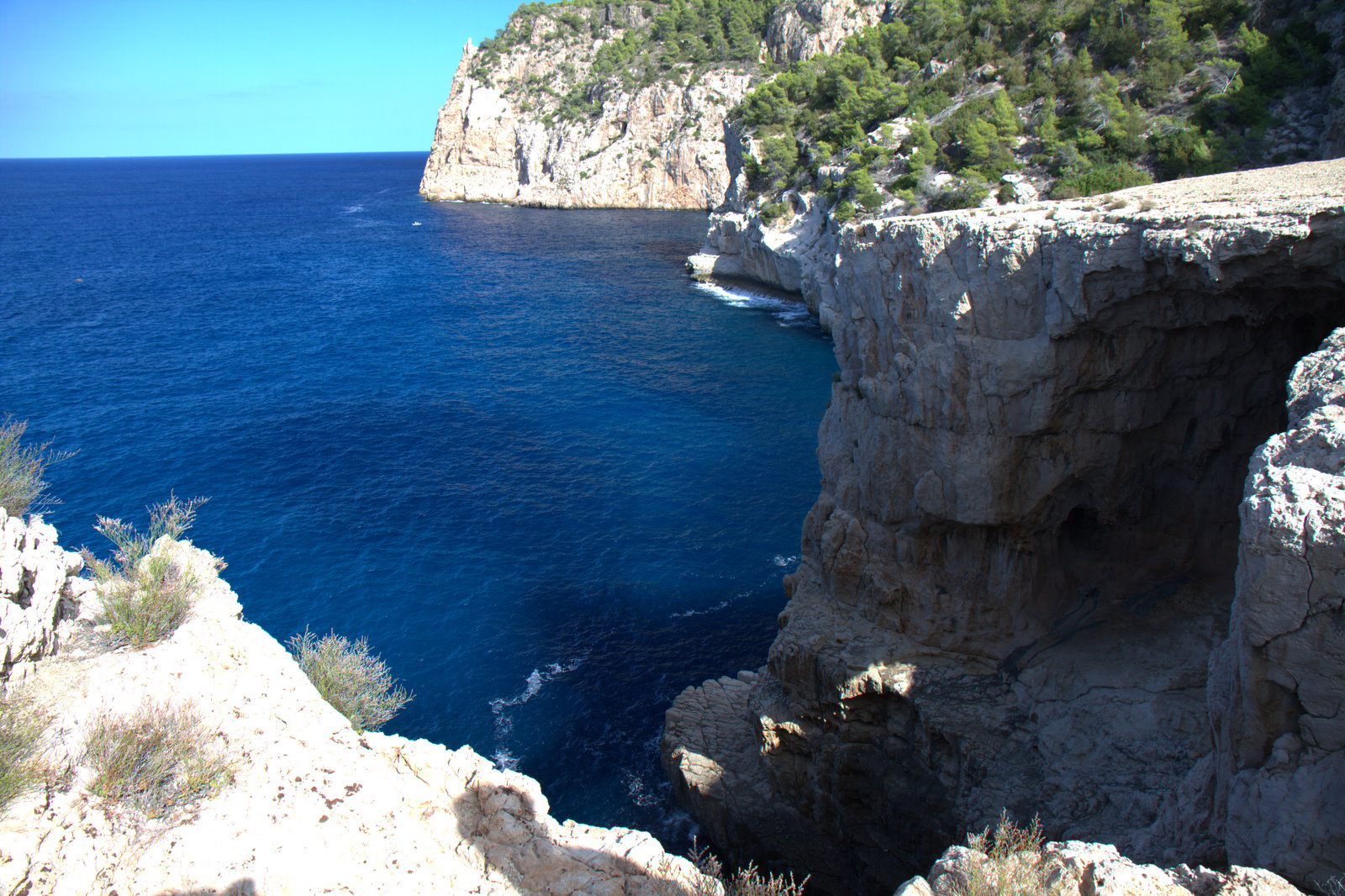
- The cove of Cala d'Albarca

- Location within Ibiza
- Coordinates: 39°3′47″N 1°22′35″E
- Location: Sant Antoni de Portmany, Spain

Cala d'Albarca is a cove on the northern seaboard of the Spanish island of Ibiza. The cove is situated within the municipality Sant Antoni de Portmany. It is 4.0 miles (6.4 km) north east of the village of Santa Agnès de Corona and 14.0 miles (22.5 km) north of Ibiza Town.

== Description ==
The cove in a large horseshoe with a rocky peninsula on either side. To the eastern end is Cap des Rubió while at the western end is Cap d'Albarca both of which are over 200 metres (660 ft) above sea level. To south of d'Albarca are the hills of Puig d'en Cires and Puig de sa Cova’, 295 metres (968 ft) and 340 metres (1,120 ft) above sea level, respectively. Down in the cove there is a rocky and sand-less beach and the coastline is scattered with huge boulders. One major feature is a cracked natural arch. There are many flat rocks and ledges close to the waters edge. The water in the bay is clear and a deep turquoise hue. The bay is often used for snorkelling and diving.

== Gallery ==
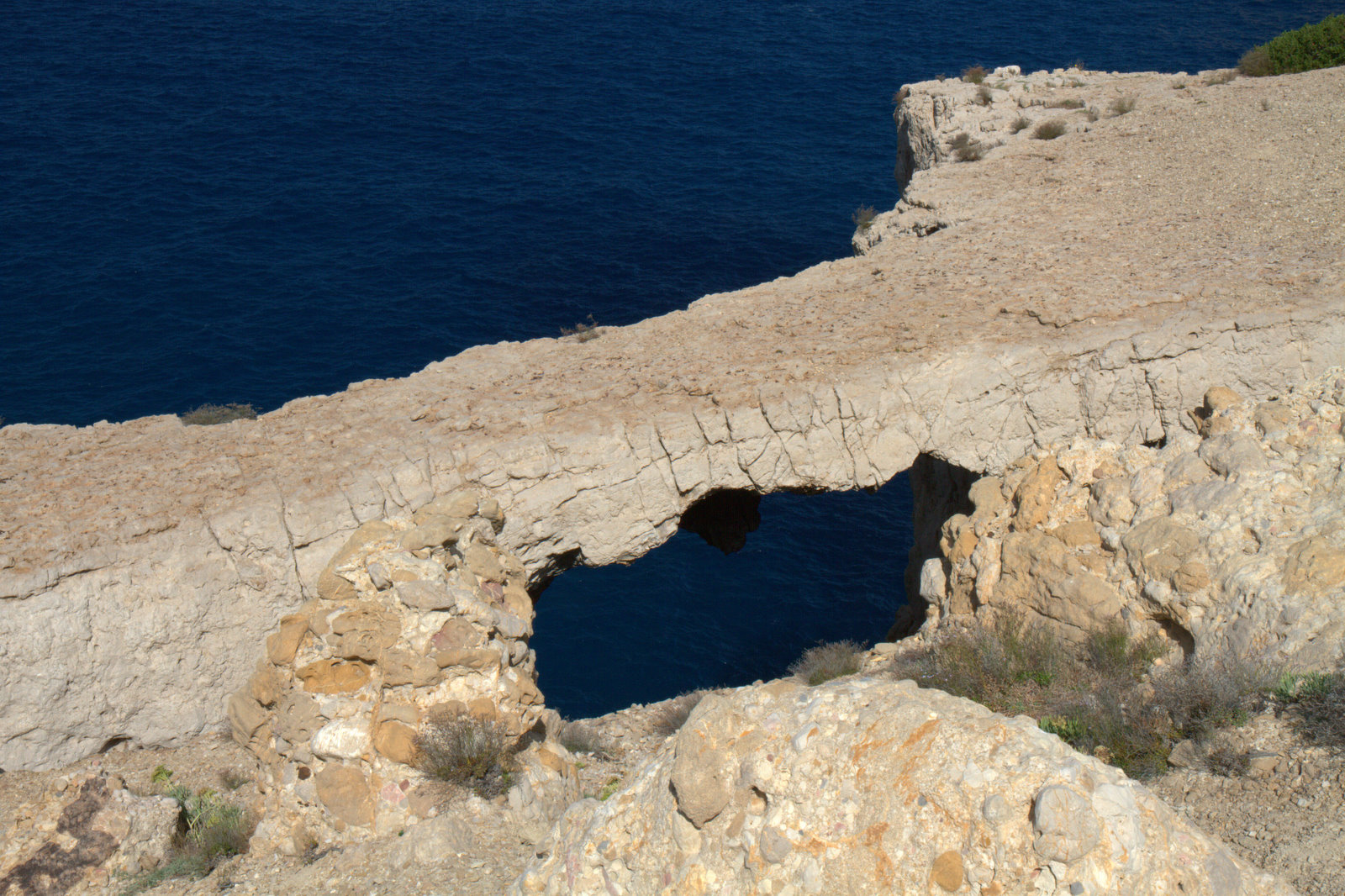
The Stone Archway

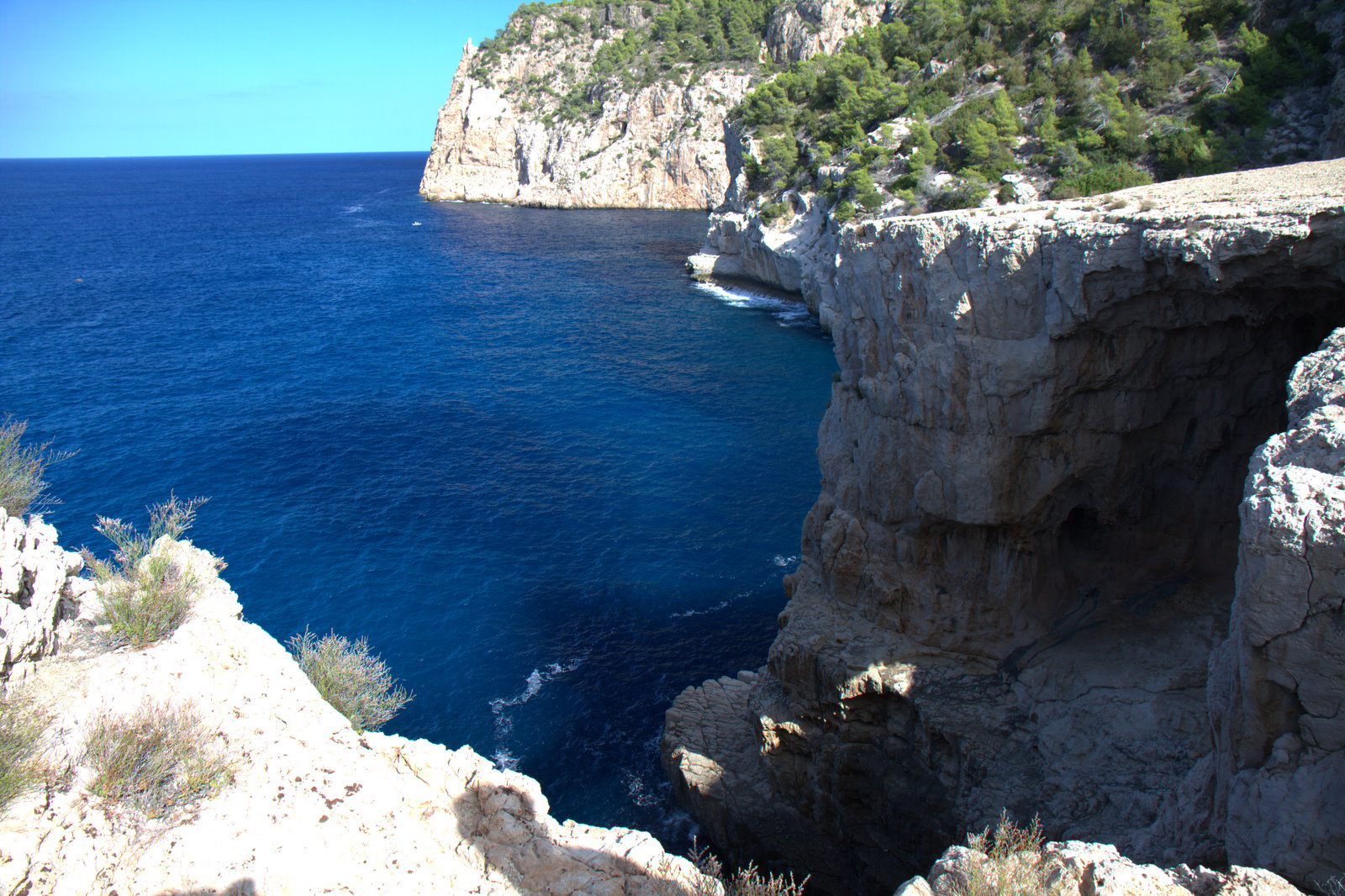

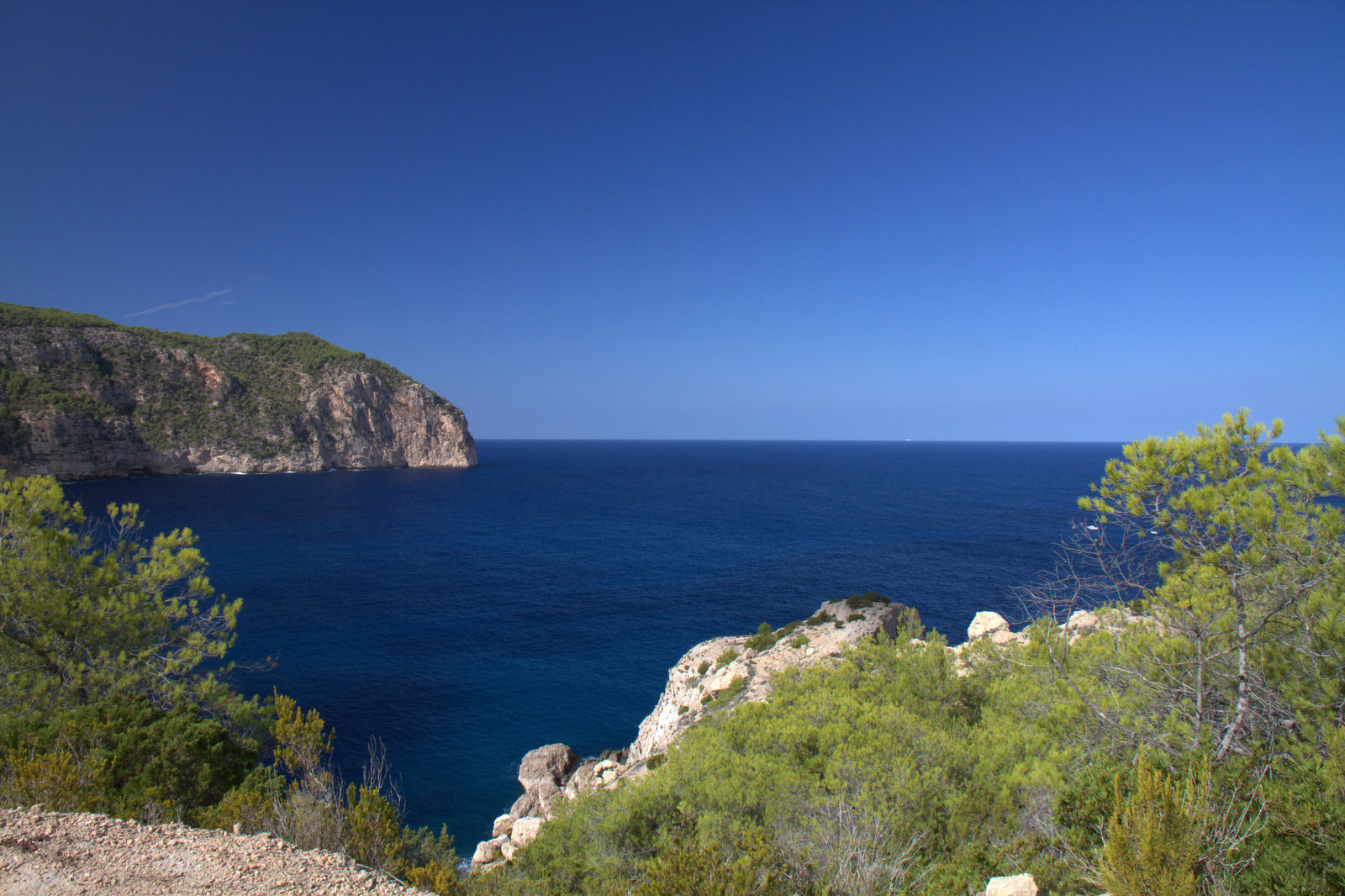
