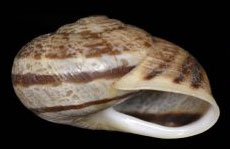
- Aperture view of shell

Conservation status
- Near Threatened (IUCN 3.1)

Scientific classification
- Domain: Eukaryota
- Kingdom: Animalia
- Phylum: Mollusca
- Class: Gastropoda
- Order: Stylommatophora
- Family: Helicidae
- Genus: Allognathus
- Species: A. campanyonii

Binomial name
- Allognathus campanyonii (Rossmässler, 1839)

Synonyms
- Allognathus (Iberellus) campanyonii (Rossmässler, 1839)· accepted, alternate representation; Allognathus (Iberellus) campanyonii campanyonii (Rossmässler, 1839)· accepted, alternate representation; Helix Companyonii Aléron in Companyo, 1837 (nomen nudum); Helix Campanyonii Rossmässler, 1839; Helix hispanica var. pyrenaica Rossmässler, 1839; Helix orberndörferi Kobelt, 1882; Iberellus minoricensis palumbariae Aguilar-Amat, 1933; Iberellus minoricensis horadadae Jaeckel, 1952; Allognathus pyrenaicus Rossmässler, 1839

= Allognathus campanyonii =

Species of gastropod

Allognathus campanyonii is a species of land snail in the family Helicidae, the true snails.

== Subspecies ==
Five subspecies are currently recognized.

Subspecies	Shell (scale bar 1 cm)
A. c. campanyonii (Rossmässler, 1839)	Allognathus campanyonii campanyonii Frenchs Monument (Cabrera Archipelago)
A. c. minoricensis (Mittre, 1842)	Allognathus campanyonii minoricensis Ses Olles, Es Mercadal (Menorca)
A. c. pythiusensis (Bofill & Aguilar-Amat, 1924)	Allognathus campanyonii pythiusensis Na Plana (Ses Bledes)
A. c. tanitianus (Forés & Vilella, 1993)	Allognathus campanyonii tanitianus Cala Salada (Eivissa)
A. c. n. ssp (Chueca et al., 2015)	Allognathus campanyonii ssp. Sa Guixería, Andratx (Mallorca)

== Distribution ==
It is endemic to the Balearic Islands. It has also been introduced in several localities in the Iberian Peninsula (Banyuls-sur-Mer, Barcelona, Sitges and Tarragona) but, nowadays, only the population from Tarragona city walls is still alive.

The distribution of this taxon follows a phylogeographical pattern, where distribution ranges of the five subspecies are well delimited. Two subspecies are present in Mallorca, two in Eivissa and another one in Menorca. Allognathus campanyonii campanyonii is mainly distributed in the lower areas of Mallorca Island as well as in the Cabrera archipelago. Besides, the populations from Tarragona city walls belongs to this phylogroup. In Mallorca, we can also find the taxa A. campanyonii n. ssp., that is present in the southern Tramuntana Mountains. A. c. tanitianus and A. c. pythiusensis are the two taxa distributed in the Pityusic Islands, where the first one is present in Eivissa main island and Formentera whereas, the second one is present in Ses Bledes archipelago, although it is also present in several populations in Eivissa main Island. Finally, in Menorca Island we can find A. c. minoricensis, where two main phylogroups were recovered.
