= Sant Rafel de sa Creu =

- Village
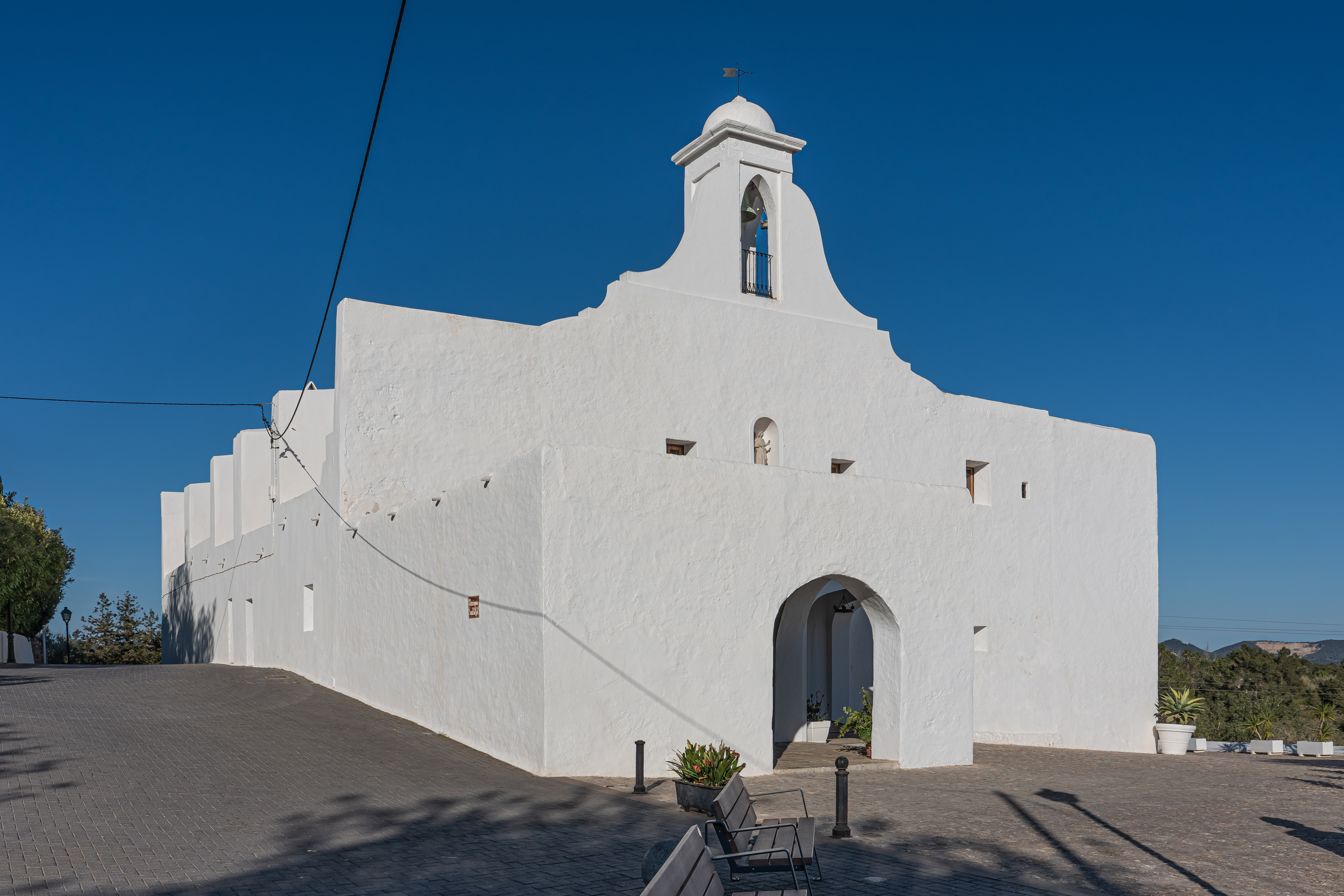
- Church of Sant Rafel

- Location of the town in Ibiza
- Coordinates: 38°57′36″N 1°23′55″E
- Country: Spain
- Autonomous Community: Balearic Islands
- Island: Ibiza
- Municipality: Sant Antoni de Portmany
- Time zone: UTC+1 (CET)
  - Summer (DST): UTC+2 (CEST)

Sant Rafel de sa Creu (Spanish: San Rafael de la Cruz) is a village on the island of Ibiza, in the Balearic Islands, Spain. It is located in the central part of the island, near the boundary between the municipalities of Sant Antoni de Portmany and Santa Eulària des Riu, and administratively belongs to Sant Antoni de Portmany.

The village lies along the EI-600 road, which connects Ibiza Town with San Antonio. Due to its location, Sant Rafel de sa Creu has developed as a transit settlement and a local centre for services.

Sant Rafel de sa Creu is known for its traditional crafts, especially ceramics. Several workshops in the village produce traditional pottery.

At the centre of the village is a church, around which the historical settlement developed.
