= Cala Tarida =

Beach resort in Ibiza, Spain

- Beach
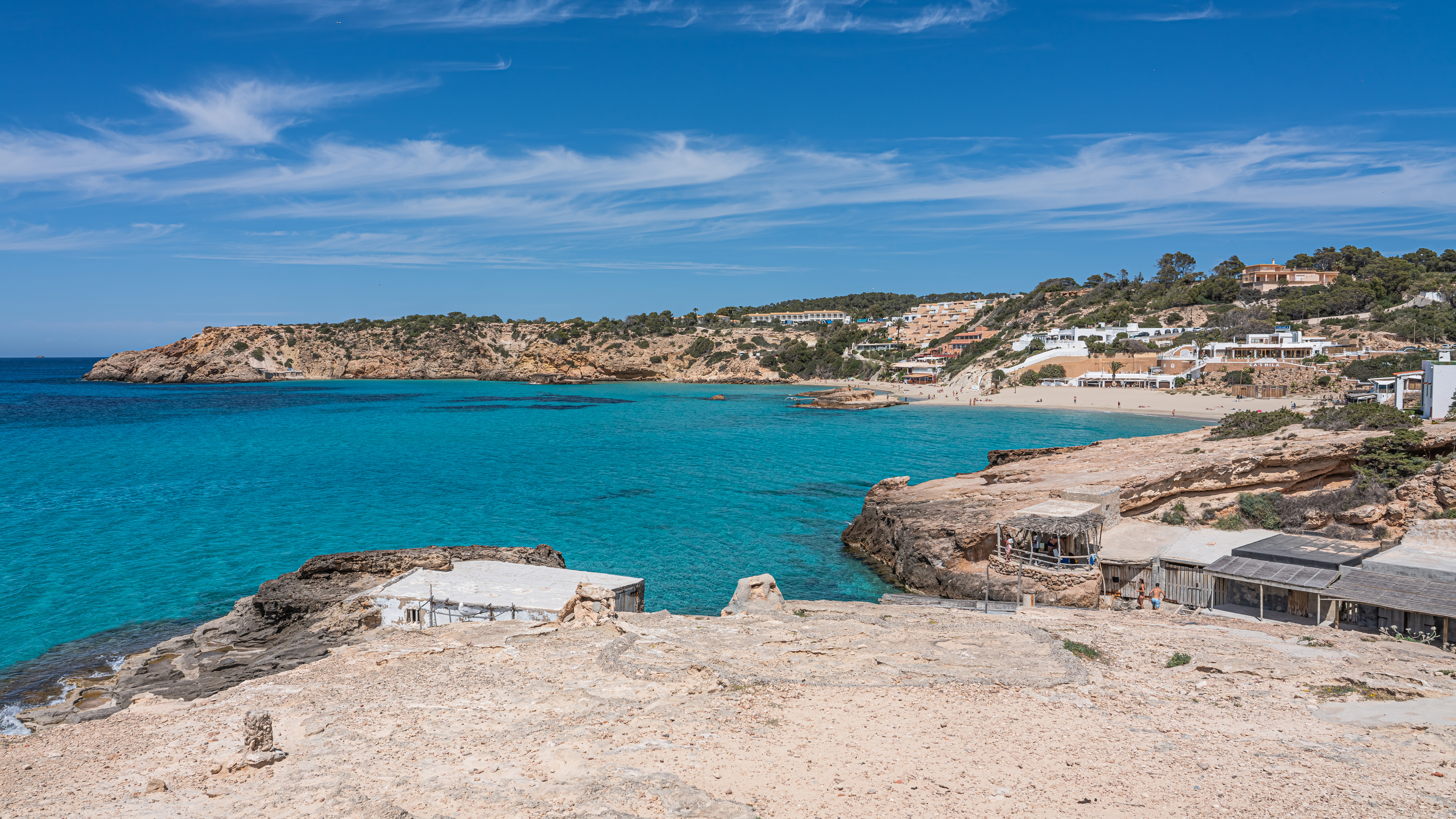
- Cala Tarida

- Location of Cala Tarida on Ibiza
- Coordinates: 38°56′23″N 1°14′10″E
- Location: Sant Josep de sa Talaia, Balearic Islands, Spain

Cala Tarida is a beach resort on the western seaboard of the Spanish island of Ibiza. It is in the municipality of Sant Josep de sa Talaia and is 13.3 miles (21.4 km) west of the town of Ibiza town. The nearest village of Santa Agnès de Corona is 5.2 miles (8.4 km) east of the resort.

== Description ==
Cala Tarida is in a sheltered bay on the west coast. The white sand is fine and clean and has a southerly aspect. The waters are clean and crystal clear over a sandy bottom and are shallow to quite a long way out. To the right hand side of the beach the water is deeper, and there are two satellite beaches, both with fine sand. The left hand side of the cove is also rocky.
