= West End, San Antonio, Ibiza =

Area of Sant Antoni de Portmany, Ibiza, Spain

Coordinates: 38°58′51″N 1°18′2″E

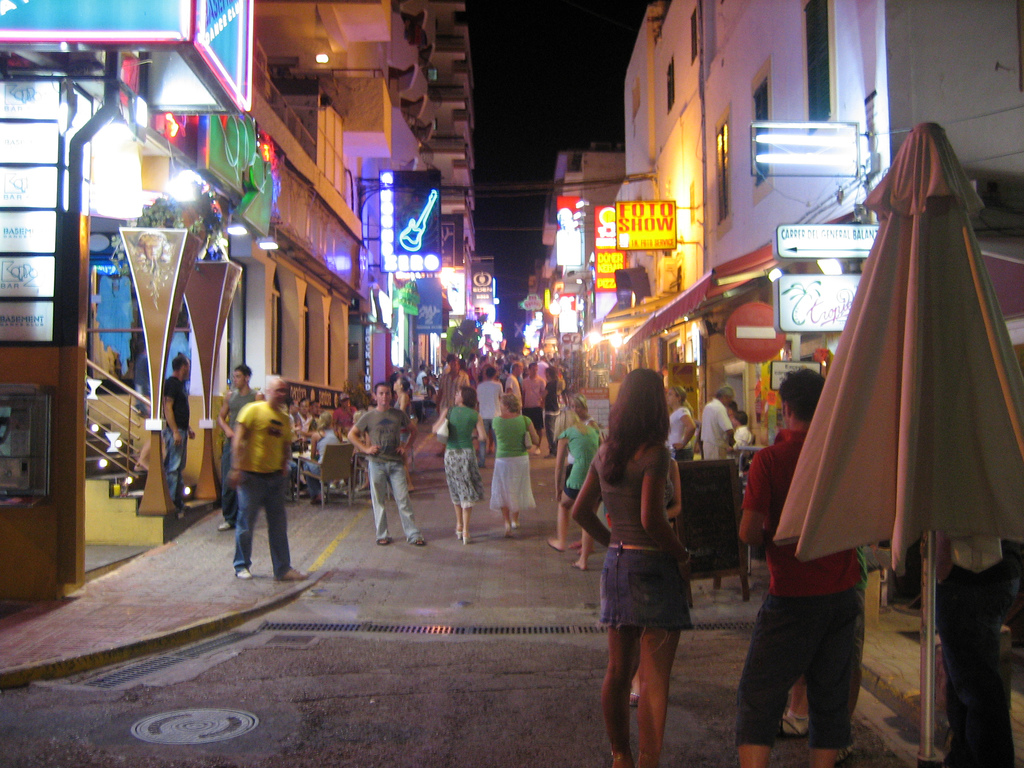
A view up the hill of the San Antonio West End

It is an entertainment district in Spain that is made up of a few streets and one long bar strip in the popular tourist destination of San Antonio, Ibiza is referred to as "The West End". "The Strip" or "het marginaal straatje". This area is based around Carrer Santa Agnès.

Popular bars in this area include the Revolutions, Soho, Dub Diamond, Koppas, Soul City, Taboo and the Tropicanas. Bars generally play more commercial house music than the rest of the Balearic Island. However some of the bars, such as Viva, operate an open decks policy. Outside, the streets are littered with chairs and tables where holidaymakers can sit and enjoy a drink.

The West End's bars are open seven days a week from May through to the end of September. Moreover, there is a limited number of bars open throughout the week in April and October. During the off season of November to March, only a handful of the bars aimed at the locals and winter workers open at the weekends

The area is even referred to in Spanish as "el West".
