= Cala Salada =

Cove on the Spanish island of Ibiza

- Beach
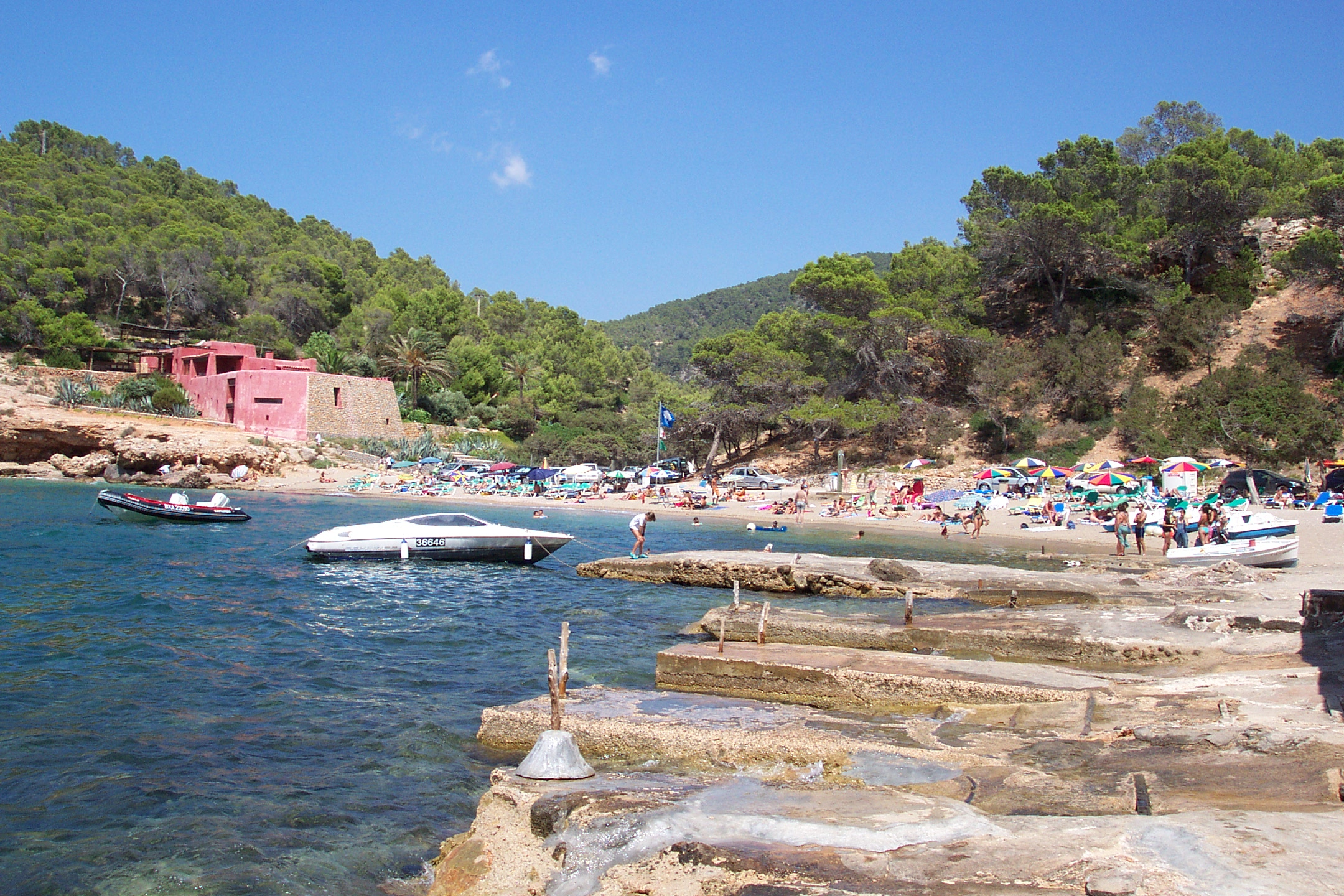
- Platja Cala Salada

- Location of Cala Salada on Ibiza
- Coordinates: 39°0′35″N 1°17′57″E
- Location: Sant Antoni de Portmany, Ibiza, Spain

Cala Salada is a cove on the Spanish island of Ibiza. It is in the municipality of Sant Antoni de Portmany and is 2.9 miles (4.7 km) north of the town of Sant Antoni de Portmany. The village of Santa Agnès de Corona is 5.4 miles (8.7 km) north east of the beach.

== Gallery ==
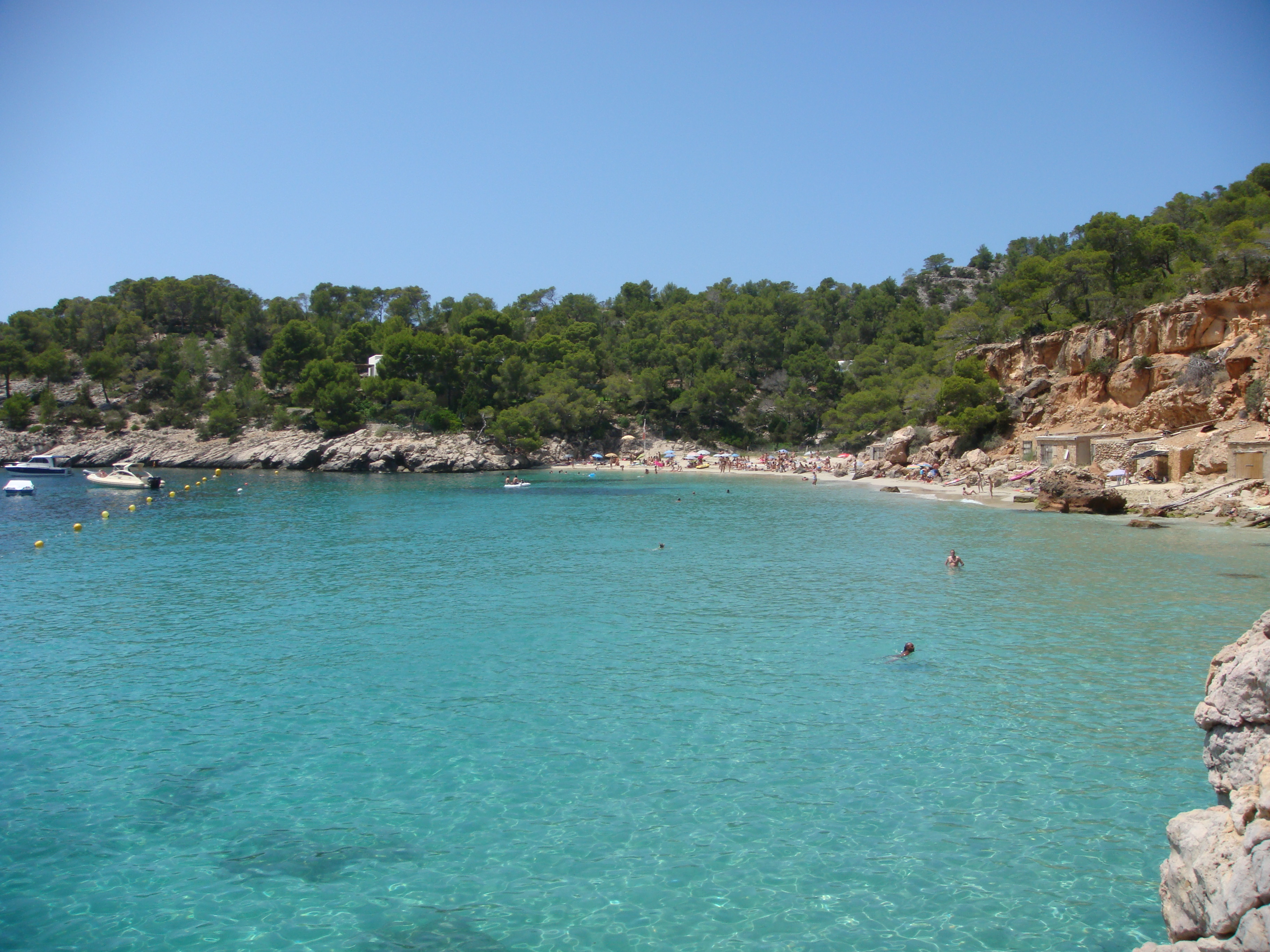
Platja Cala Salada

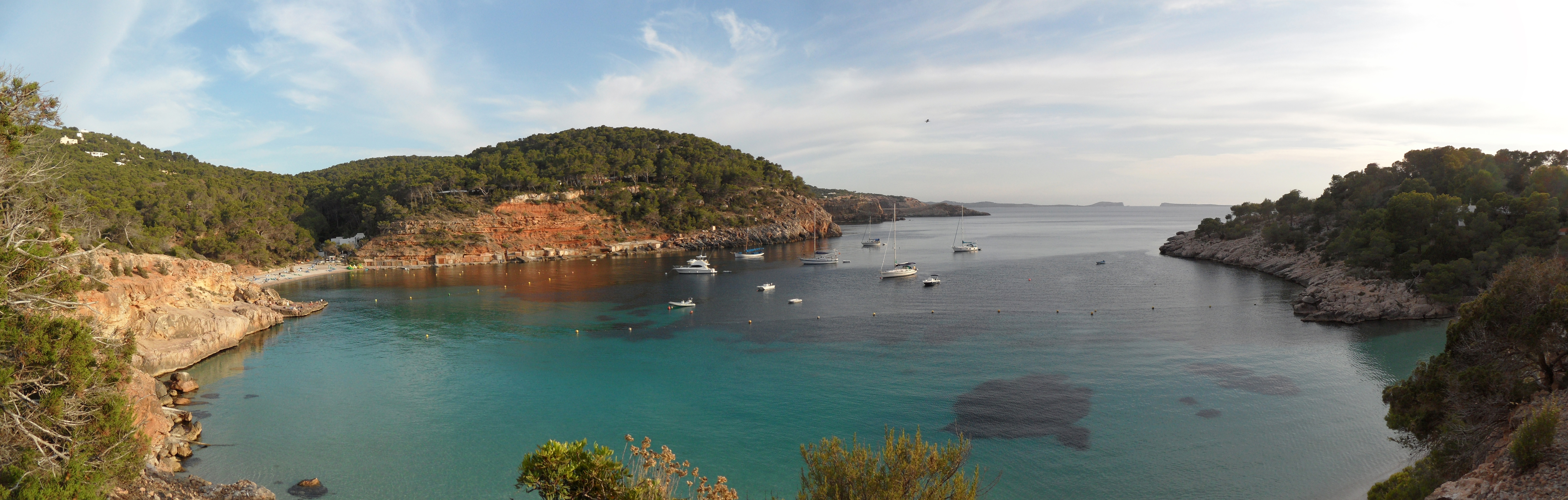
Cala Salada
