= Cala Bassa =

Beach in Ibiza, Spain

- Beach
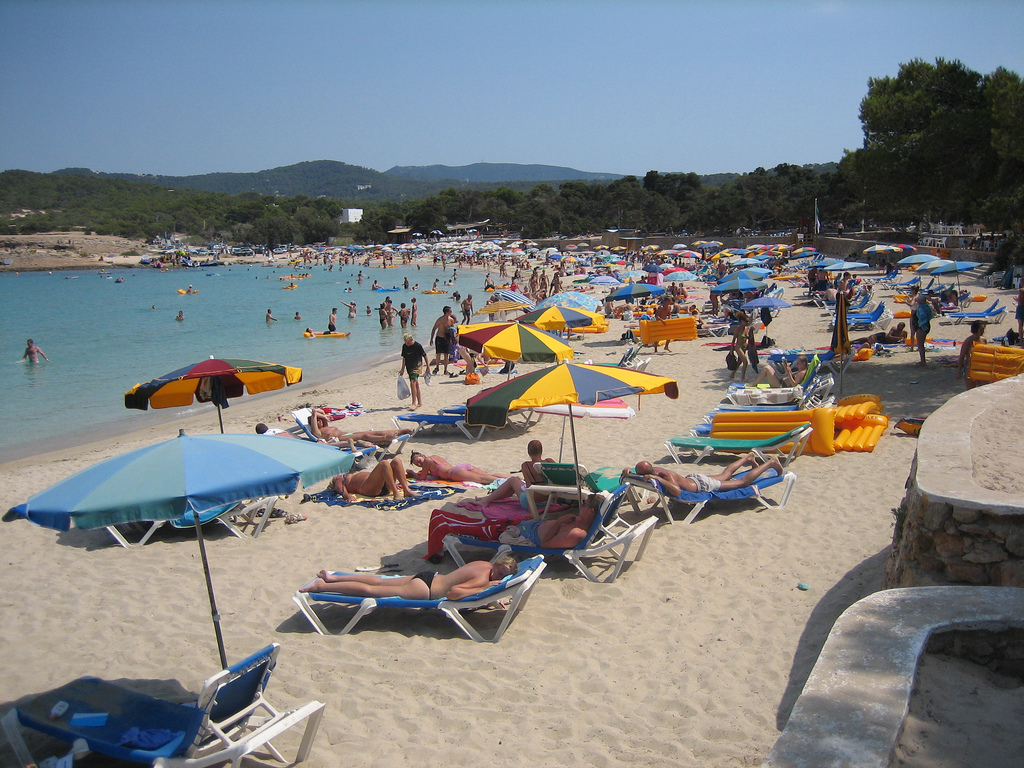
- The Beach at Cala Bassa

- Location of Cala Bassa on Ibiza
- Coordinates: 38°58′4″N 1°14′23″E
- Location: Sant Josep de sa Talaia, Ibiza, Spain

Cala Bassa is a beach in the north western seaboard of the Spanish island of Ibiza. It is in the municipality of Sant Josep de sa Talaia and is 15.5 miles (24.9 km) North west of the town of Ibiza town. The nearest village of Santa Agnès de Corona is 4.6 miles (7.4 km) south east of the beach.

== Gallery ==
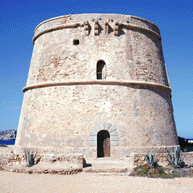
Torre d'en Rovira

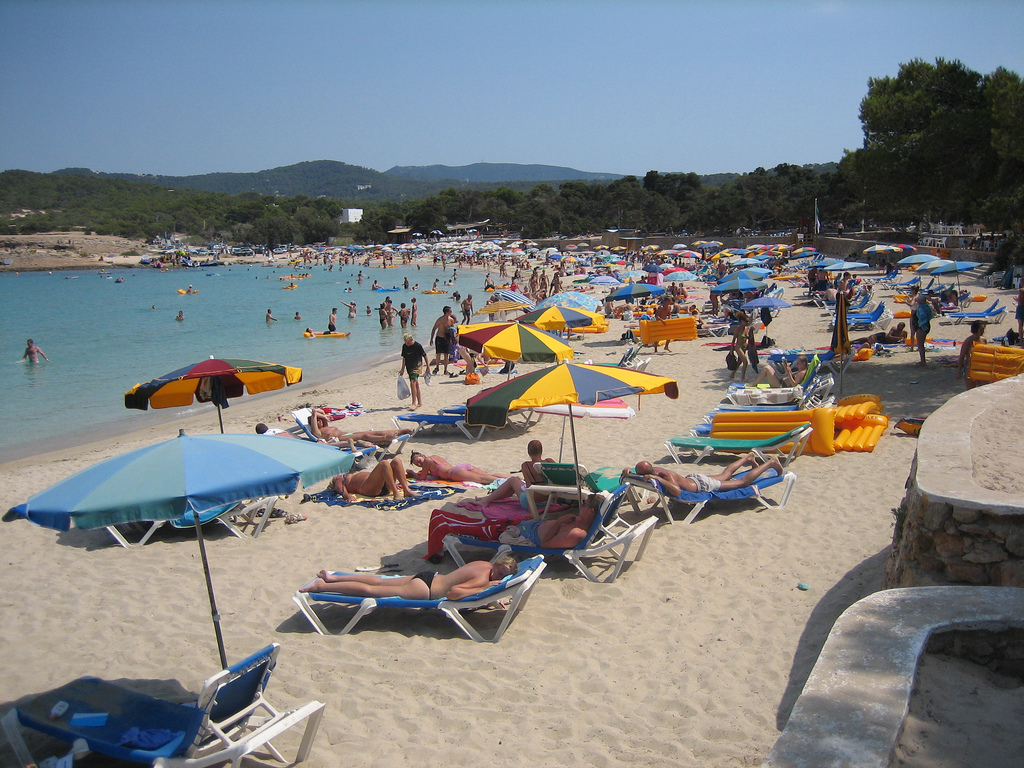
The beach
