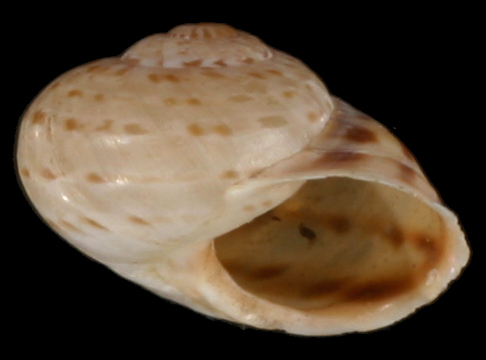
- Apertural view of the shell of Allognathus graellsianus

Scientific classification
- Kingdom: Animalia
- Phylum: Mollusca
- Class: Gastropoda
- Order: Stylommatophora
- Family: Helicidae
- Subfamily: Helicinae
- Tribe: Allognathini
- Genus: Allognathus; Pilsbry, 1888

Synonyms
- Iberellus Hesse, 1908

= Allognathus =

Genus of gastropods

Allognathus is a genus of air-breathing land snails, terrestrial pulmonate gastropod mollusks in the family Helicidae, the true snails. The genus is endemic to the Balearic Islands (Western Mediterranean) being present in all major islands and in several small islets. The genus colonized the archipelago from the south-eastern Iberian Peninsula during the Middle Miocene, throughout a land-bridge connection. The different species belonging to Allognathus live in crevice rocks or under stones.

For some authors, Allognathus include two subgenus, Allognathus s. str., that is monospecific, and Iberellus Hesse 1908, that includes at least two species.

== Species ==
Species within the genus Allognathus include:

- Allognathus campanyonii (Rossmässler, 1839)
- Allognathus graellsianus (Pfeiffer, 1848) - type species
- Allognathus hispanicus (Rossmässler, 1838)
