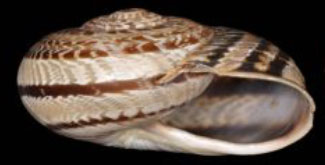
- Aperture view of the shell of Allognathus hispanicus

Conservation status
- Least Concern (IUCN 3.1)

Scientific classification
- Domain: Eukaryota
- Kingdom: Animalia
- Phylum: Mollusca
- Class: Gastropoda
- Order: Stylommatophora
- Family: Helicidae
- Genus: Allognathus
- Species: A. hispanicus

Binomial name
- Allognathus hispanicus (Rossmässler, 1838)

Synonyms
- Helix hispanica Rossmässler, 1838; Helix balearica Rossmässler, 1838 (in syn.); Iberellus balearicus Rossmässler, 1838

= Allognathus hispanicus =

Species of gastropod

Allognathus hispanicus (now known as Allognathus balearicus) is a species of land snail in the family Helicidae, the true snails. This species is endemic to Mallorca, one of Spain's Balearic Islands. The common name is "caragol de Serp" (snake snail), due to the pattern of its shell.

The snail lives in cracks in rocks and walls, and is only active when it rains.

== Description ==
Globose-flatenned shell with 4 ½ whorls with a clear suture and thin and irregular striation. The last whorl 3 times larger than the penultimate, growing progressively to the aperture. The aperture is oblique-oval descending from the third to the fourth whorl. Soft peristome with a brownish inner lip slightly reflected. Umbilicus is completely closed.

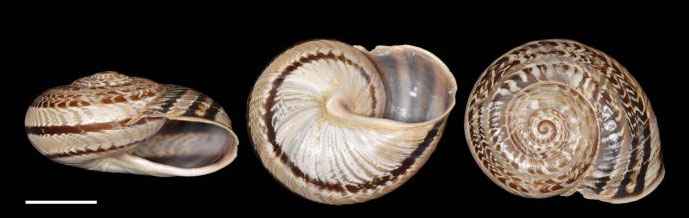
Allognathus hispanicus Puíg de la Verge, Pollença (Mallorca). Scale bar 1 cm.

== Distribution ==
The species is distributed along the northern Tramuntana Mountains in western Mallorca, cohabiting in many localities with A. graellsianus.
