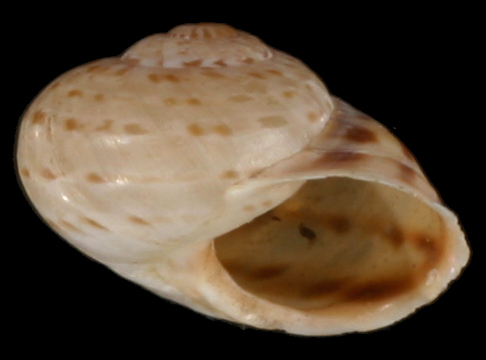
- Apertural view of the shell of Allognathus graellsianus

Conservation status
- Least Concern (IUCN 3.1)

Scientific classification
- Kingdom: Animalia
- Phylum: Mollusca
- Class: Gastropoda
- Order: Stylommatophora
- Family: Helicidae
- Genus: Allognathus
- Species: A. graellsianus

Binomial name
- Allognathus graellsianus (Pfeiffer, 1853)

Synonyms
- Helix grateloupi Graells, 1846; Helix graellsiana Pfeiffer, 1848

= Allognathus graellsianus =

Species of gastropod

Allognathus graellsianus is a species of land snail in the family Helicidae, the true snails. It is endemic to Mallorca, one of Spain's Balearic Islands. This taxa is the type species of the genus Allognathus.

The snail lives in cracks in rocks and walls and is only active when it rains.

== Description ==
A. graellsianus presents a thin globose shell. It has from 4 to 4 ½ whorls of fast growth, showing 5 bands well separated and usually discontinued. The aperture is oval-rounded with a reddish brown reflected peristome. The umbilicus is completely closed.

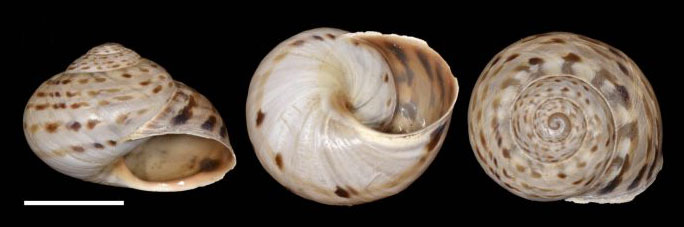
Allognathus graellsianus Escorca (Mallorca). Scale bar 1 cm.

== Distribution ==
The species is distributed along northwestern Tramuntana Mountains (western Mallorca), cohabiting in many localities with A. hispanicus.
