= Sant Antoni de Portmany (municipality) =

- Municipality
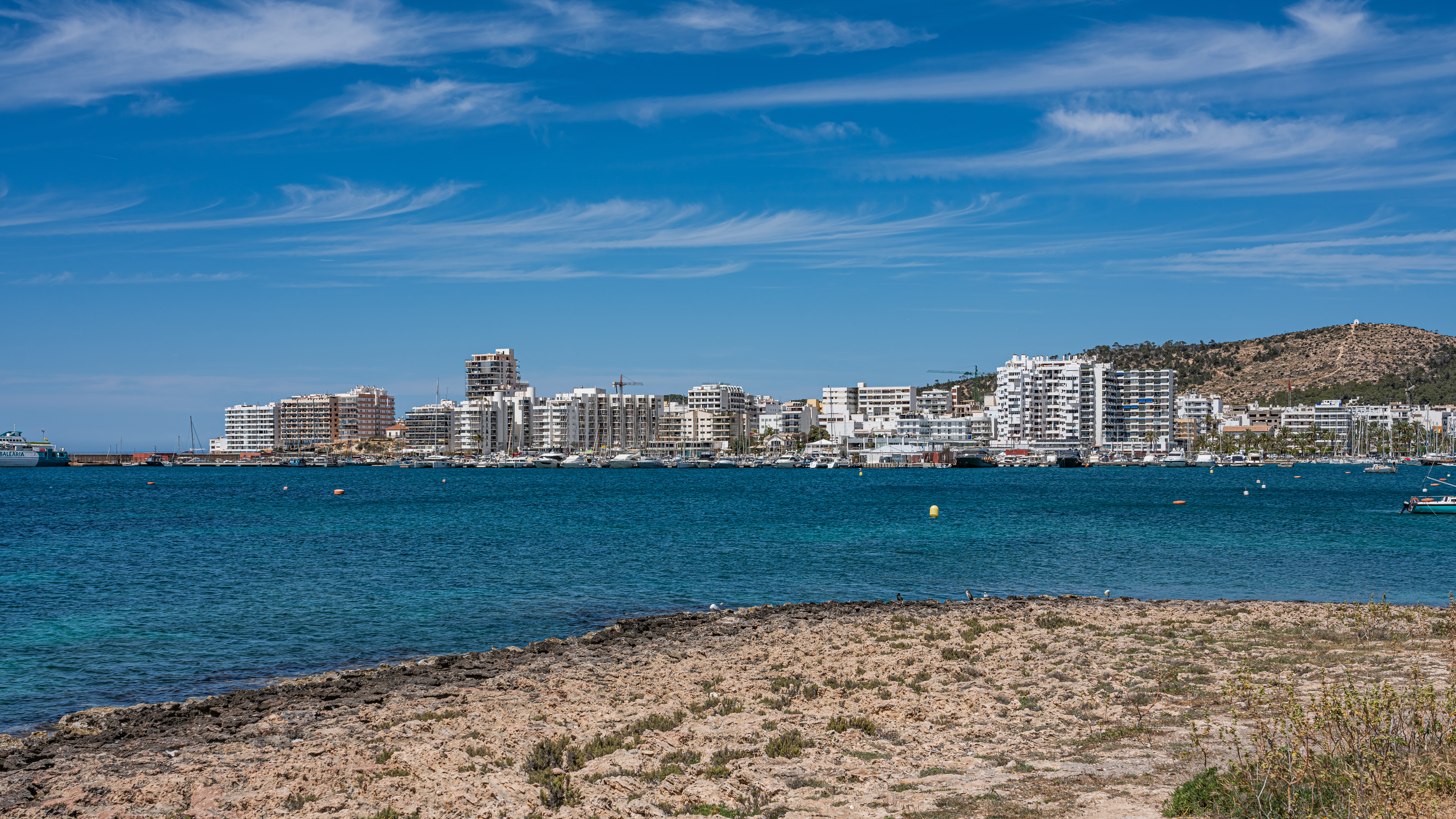
- The skyline of Sant Antoni de Portmany

- Coat of arms

- Municipal location

- Location of the Town of Sant Antoni de Portmany Sant Antoni de Portmany (Balearic Islands) Sant Antoni de Portmany (Spain)
- Coordinates: 38°58′21″N 1°18′21″E
- Country: Spain
- Region: Balearic Islands

Government
  - Mayor: Marcos Serra Colomar (PP)

Area
  - Total: 48.96 sq mi (126.80 km^{2})

Population (2024)
  - Total: 28,884
- Time zone: UTC+1 (CET)
  - Summer (DST): UTC+2 (CEST)
- Urban centre: Sant Antoni de Portmany

Sant Antoni de Portmany (Balearic Catalan: [ˌsant ənˈtɔni ðə puɾˈmaɲ], Spanish: San Antonio Abad) is a municipality located on the northwestern coast of Ibiza, one of Spain's Balearic Islands. Its municipality center is situated on the Bay of Sant Antoni and the municipality also includes smaller villages and natural attractions such as cave paintings, coves, and beaches. As of 2024, the population stands at 28,884 people.

== Geography and location ==
Sant Antoni de Portmany is located on the northwestern coast of the island of Ibiza. The municipality shares borders with Sant Josep de sa Talaia, Ibiza Town, and Santa Eulària des Riu. While the name is often associated with its main population center, located along the Bay of Sant Antoni, the municipality also includes a number of quieter inland villages and natural attractions.

Sant Rafel de sa Creu is located in the south of the municipality, close to the border with Ibiza Town, and is considered to be one of the first settlements on the island. To the north, lies the village of Sant Mateu d'Albarca. More to the north is Santa Agnès de Corona, surrounded by almond trees and near a popular hiking trail that leads to the Las Puertas del Cielo viewpoint, offering views of the sea and cliffs.

== Attractions ==
Sant Antoni de Portmany has cultural landmarks and natural attractions. They include the Sant Antonio church, originally built in 1385 as a fortress against pirate attacks, and the nearby Coves Blanques lighthouse, built in the late 19th century, now used as an exhibition space. Just north of the municipality center, the Cap Blanc Aquarium, which served as a lobster nursery, displays local marine life and has weekend sardine tastings. Northwards along the coast, the Ses Fontanelles cave has Punic-era cave paintings discovered in 1917.

The coastline around Sant Antoni de Portmany is filled with beaches and coves. Playa de S'Arenal is the main urban beach and to the north are the two coves Cala Gració and Cala Gracioneta, with the latter hosting the famous El Chiringuito restaurant, popular with nudists. Even further north are the two secluded coves Cala Salada and Cala Saladeta, which are known for their shimmering waters and golden sands, but are difficult to access. Nearby is also Punta Galera, a smooth rock platform, which is popular for cliff diving.

== Demographics ==
According to an evaluation by the Spanish National Statistics Institute, Sant Antoni de Portmany had a population of 28,884 in 2024, reflecting a steady growth from the 27,582 residents recorded in the 2021 official Spanish census. This represents a population average annual increase of approximately 1.6% over the three-year period. The municipality covers an area of 126.8 km², resulting in a population density of around 227.8 inhabitants per square kilometre.

The population structure of Sant Antoni de Portmany is fairly balanced in terms of gender, with men accounting for 15,085 individuals (52.2%) and women fewer at 13,799 (47.8%). The age distribution shows a predominantly working-age population, with 69.3% of residents between 18 and 64 years old. Children under 18 make up 17.2% of the population, while seniors aged 65 and over represent 13.5%.

The population is notably diverse with Spanish citizens making up the majority, accounting for 73.5% (21,221 people) of the population. The remaining residents include nationals from the European Union (8.6%), other European countries (2.8%), Africa (5.5%), the Americas (8.2%), and Asia and Oceania (1.4%). A slightly different pattern emerges when considering country of birth. While 66.8% of residents were born in Spain, a significant proportion were born abroad, particularly in the Americas (14.4%), followed by Africa (6.6%) and the European Union (7%). Smaller groups hail from the rest of Europe (3.1%) and Asia and Oceania (2%).

The localities of Sant Antoni de Portmany include the Municipality Seat of Sant Antoni de Portmany with a population of 21,939 estimated in 2023. The next largest locality with 672 residents is Sant Rafel de sa Creu, with other localities in the municipality including Can Llaudis, Can Tomàs, Can Pujolet, and Can Costa Redona.

== Administration and local government ==
The municipal government of Sant Antoni de Portmany is led by mayor Marcos Serra Colomar of the local political group Partido Popular (PP).

== See also ==
- The town of Sant Antoni de Portmany
