= Sant Antoni de Portmany =

Town in Ibiza, Spain

Sant Antoni de Portmany San Antonio Abad
- Town
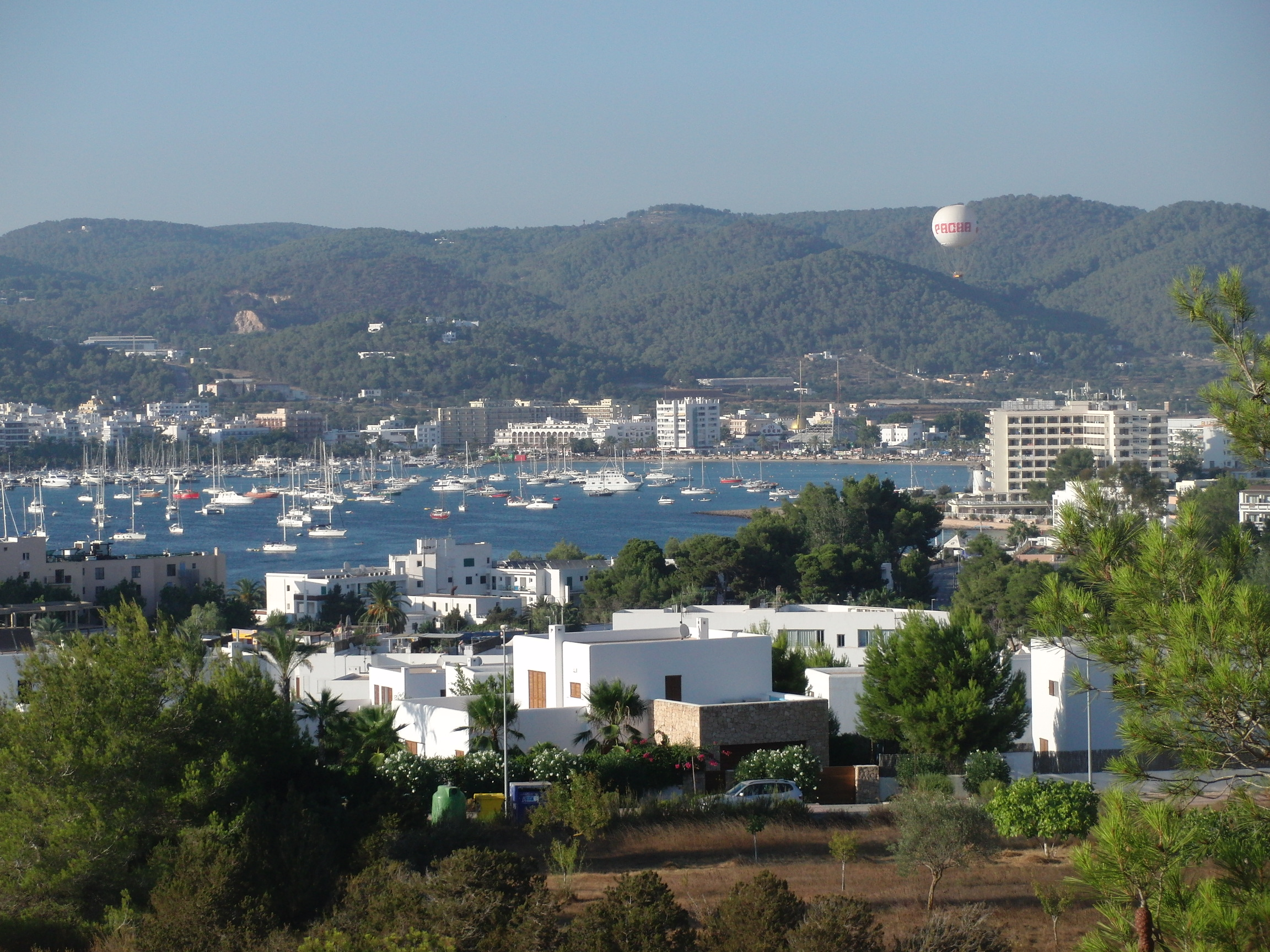
- Sant Antoni Bay

- Coat of arms

- Location in Spain
- Coordinates: 38°58′51″N 1°18′2″E
- Country: Spain
- Autonomous community: Balearic Islands
- Province: Balearic Islands
- Island: Ibiza

Government
  - Mayor: Marcos Serra Colomar (PP)

Area
  - Total: 127 km^{2} (49 sq mi)
- Elevation: 31 m (102 ft)

Population (2012)
  - Total: 22,446
  - Density: 177/km^{2} (458/sq mi)
- Time zone: UTC+1 (CET)
  - Summer (DST): UTC+2 (CEST (GMT +2))
- Postal code: 07820
- Area code: +34 (Spain) + 971 (Baleares)
- Website: Town Hall

Sant Antoni de Portmany (Balearic Catalan: [ˌsant ənˈtɔni ðə puɾˈmaɲ]; Spanish: San Antonio Abad), or simply Sant Antoni (San Antonio), is a town on the western coast of Ibiza, the second-largest town and municipality on the island. It is situated on Sant Antoni Bay on the west coast of the island, part of the Spain autonomous community of the Balearic Islands.

== History ==
For two thousand years, Sant Antoni was a small fishing village that rose from the Roman natural harbor Portus Magnus, but it began to grow in the late 1950s when many hotels and tourist resorts were built as part of a mass tourism initiative which took place across Spain. As the number of tourists grew, the development of bars, hotels and other tourist infrastructure spread right around to the other side of San Antonio bay, as far as Cala de Bou which lies in the adjacent municipality of Sant Josep de sa Talaia. Since the 1980s British tourists have made up the majority of summertime visitors to San Antonio.

=== The Egg ===
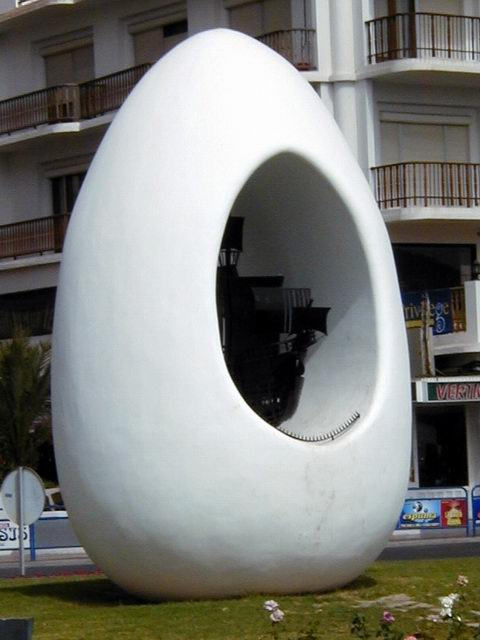
The Egg in the port of Sant Antoni

The Egg is a statue erected in the early 1990s to commemorate the local claim of having been the birthplace of Christopher Columbus (there is a similar claim that Hannibal was born in the region). The statue is in the shape of an egg, containing at its centre a model of his ship: the Santa Maria.

The choice of an egg comes from a story about Columbus, who when seeking funding for his Western route to the Indies, was told it was impossible. He then allegedly asked if standing an egg upright was impossible, and when told that it was, he cracked the base of an egg, thus making it possible for it to stand upright. He was then granted funding. See Egg of Columbus.

=== Passeig de ses Fonts ===
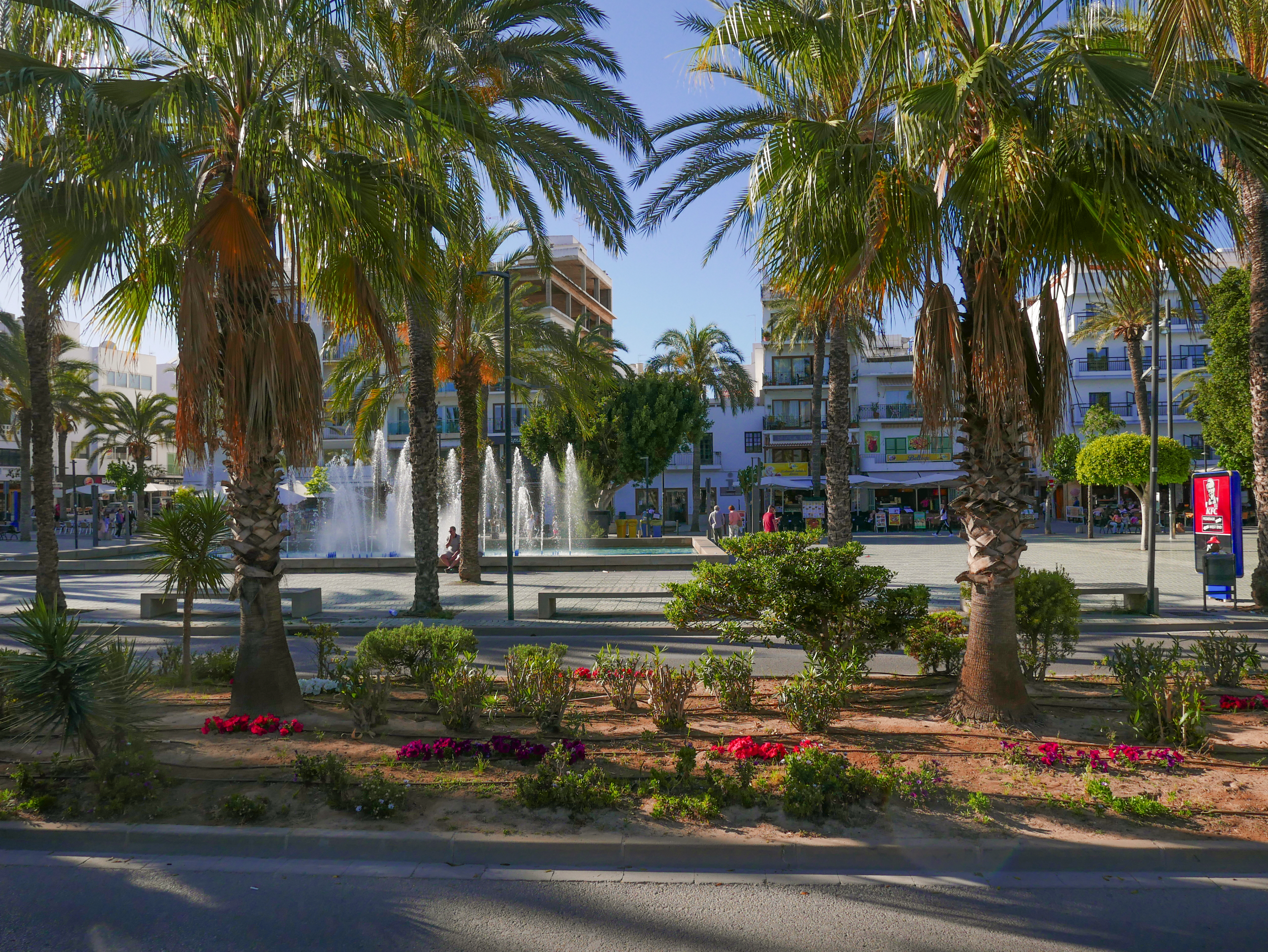
Passeig de ses Fonts

Part of Sant Antoni's harbourside promenade, Passeig de ses Fonts, is an area which was developed in the early 1990s to improve the appearance of the town. There are many plants, including palm trees and rubber plants, as well as large fountains, which are illuminated by night. Across the square are a host of restaurants and cafés offering a view over Sant Antoni Bay. It is also the best place from which to watch the massive fireworks display which celebrates the fiesta of Saint Bartholomew on 24 August.

=== West End ===
The 'West End' is an area of San Antonio. Only a couple of streets wide; the main street is the Carrer de Santa Agnès, it hosts a variety of bars ranging from the dance and house music Ibiza is famed for to rock and indie music. Originally the name "The West End" refers to a night time minibus trip from hotels in Es Cana in the 1970s that would come to San Antonio's bars (as Es Cana had no bar scene) and the name of this tour package was "The West End Experience". Since then the area has become known simply as "The West End".

=== Sunset Strip ===
Along the coast of the natural bay of San Antonio de Portmany in the west is the Sunset Strip - a venue where visitors to the island meet at sunset at various bars including the Café del Mar, Café Mambo, where the likes of Swedish House Mafia, Carl Cox, David Guetta and Pete Tong DJ on a regular basis. The west-facing strip of coastline means that it faces the sunset.

=== Ferries and boat cruises ===
Among the harbour of San Antonio there are various boats and ferries that have multiple connections to beaches. These have daily departures from may until end September or October. Also once a week there is a ferry to Formentera.

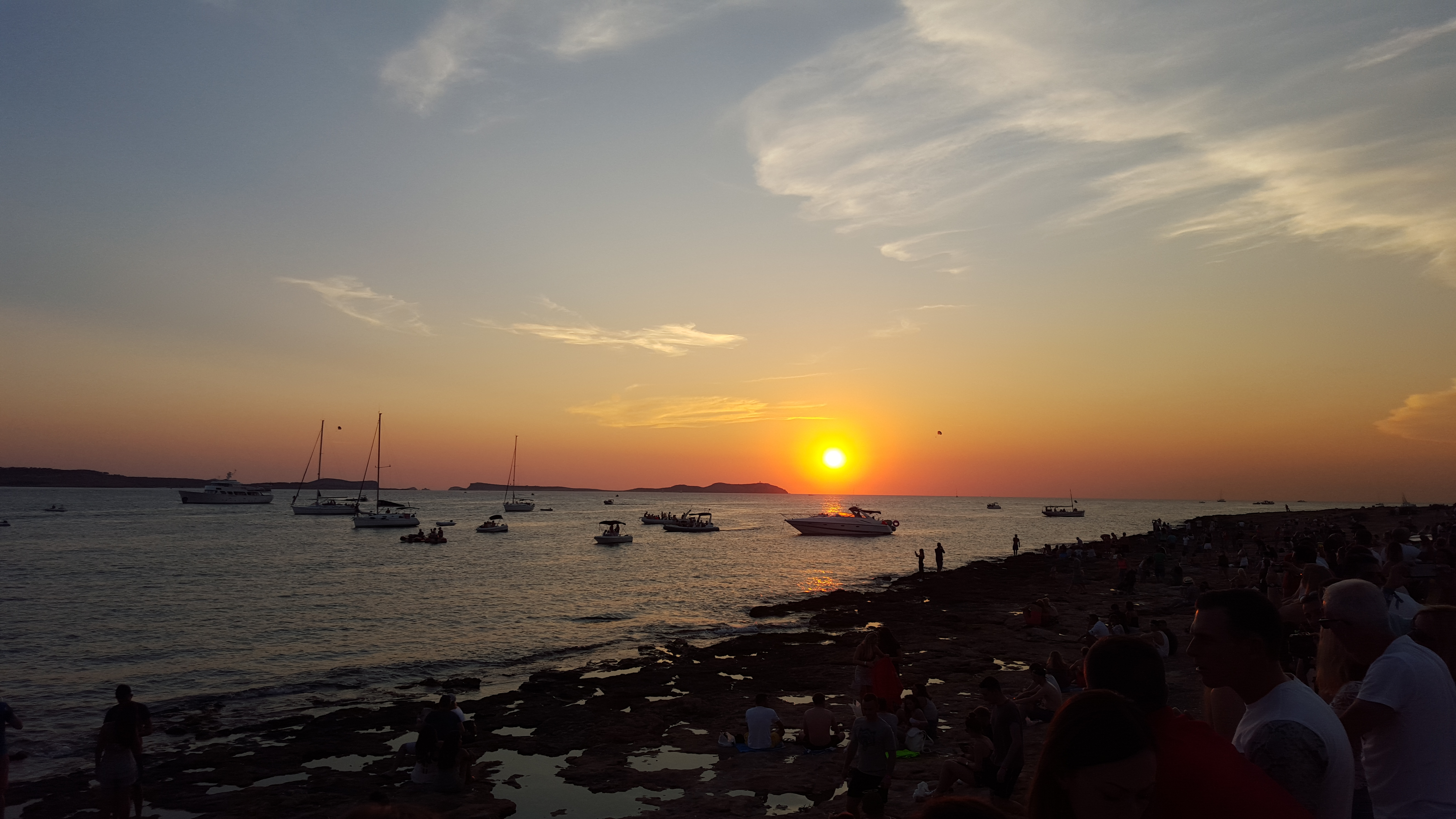

== Gallery ==
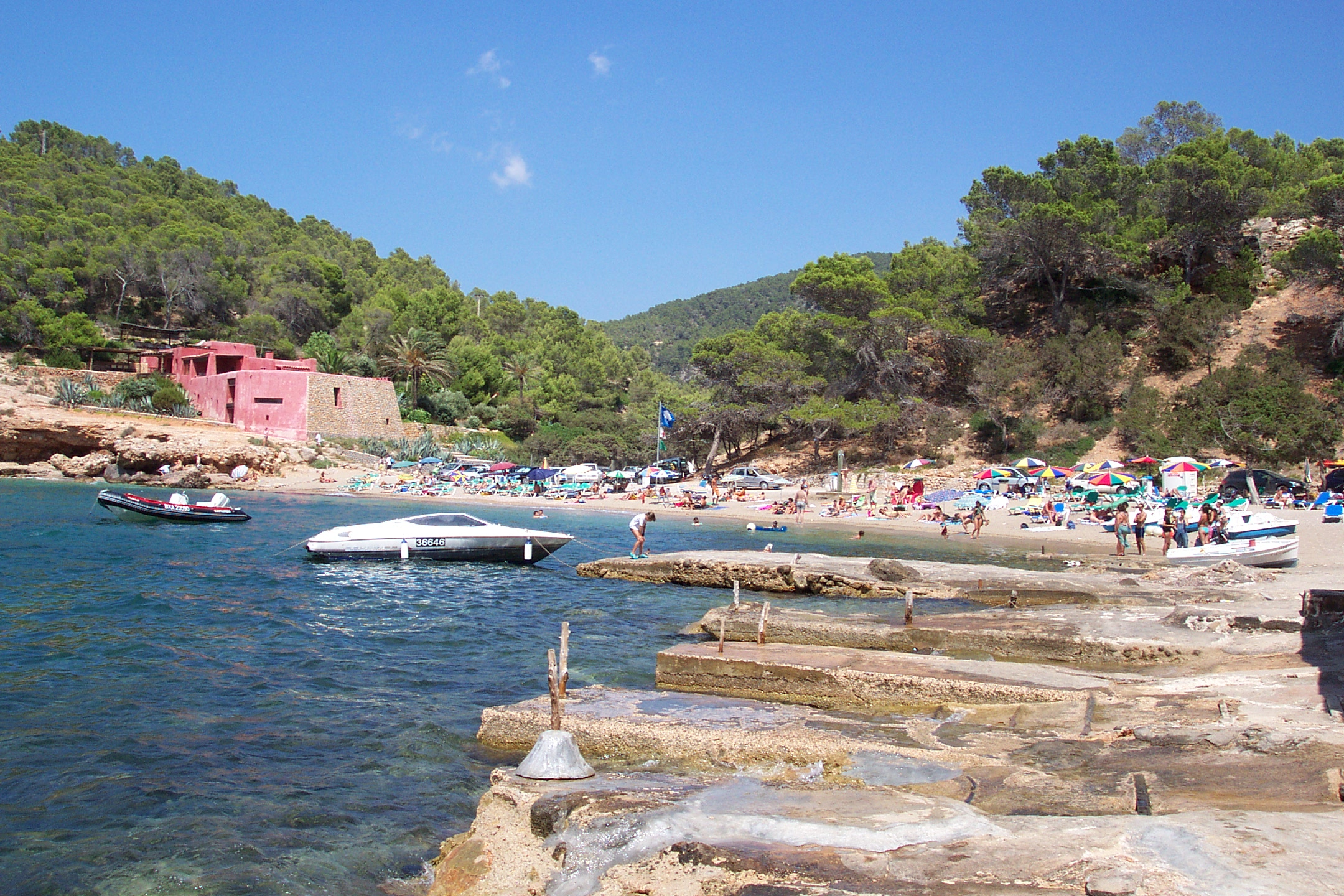
Cala Salada, north of Sant Antoni

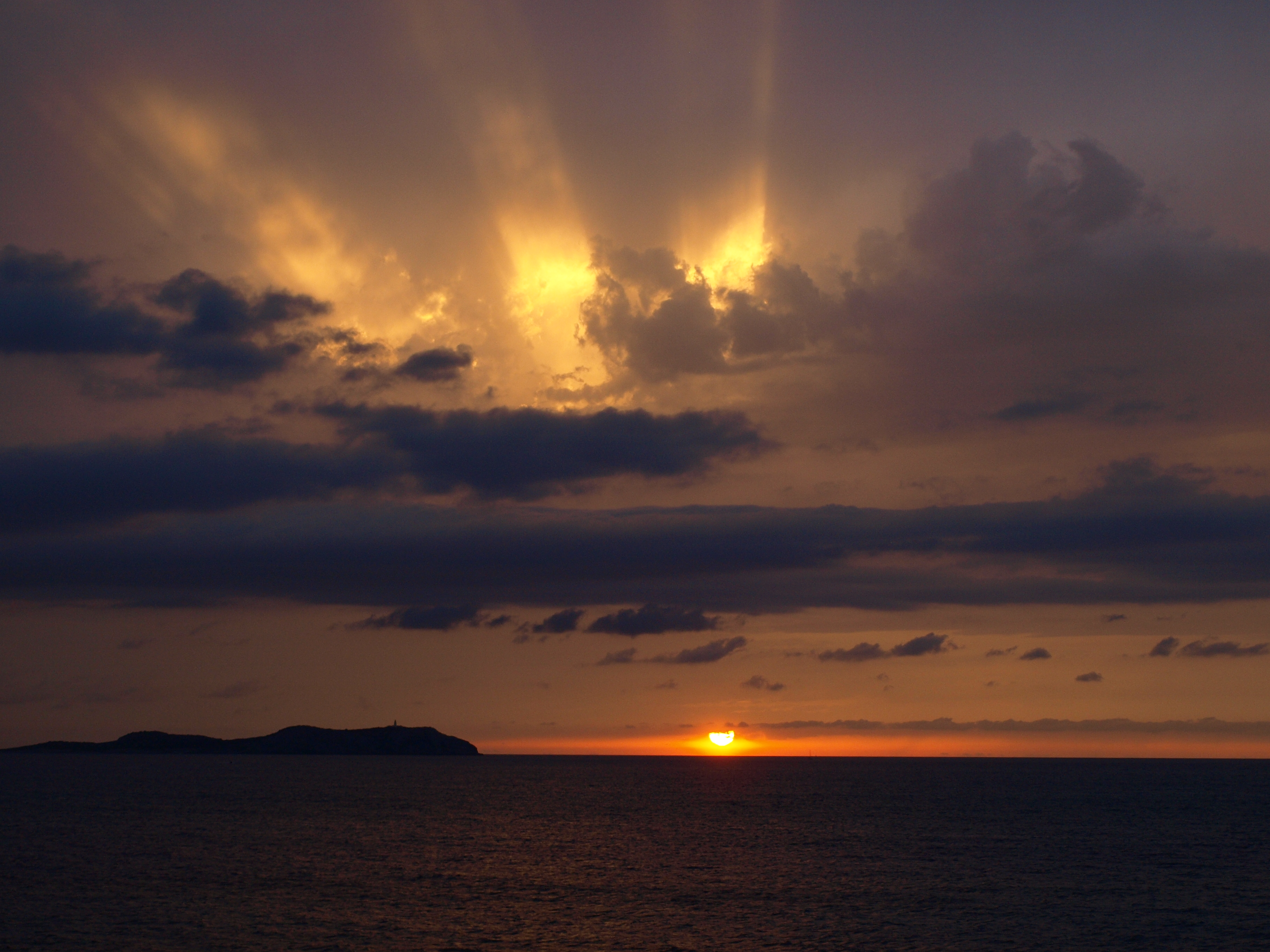
Sunset

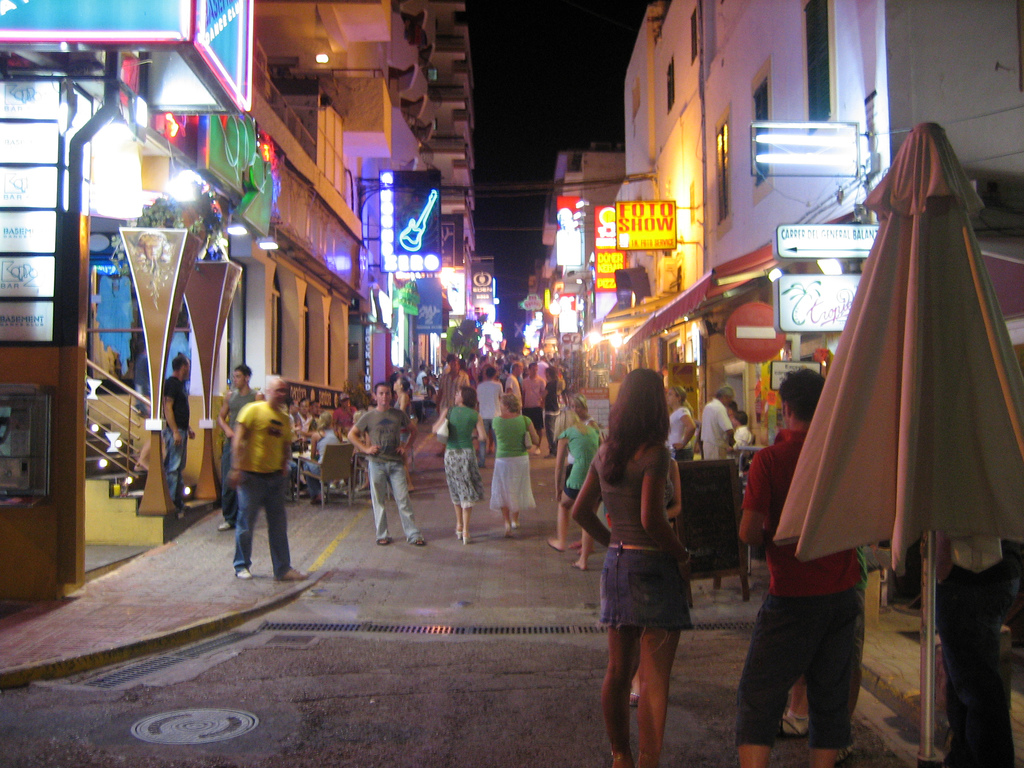
West End of Sant Antoni in July 2006

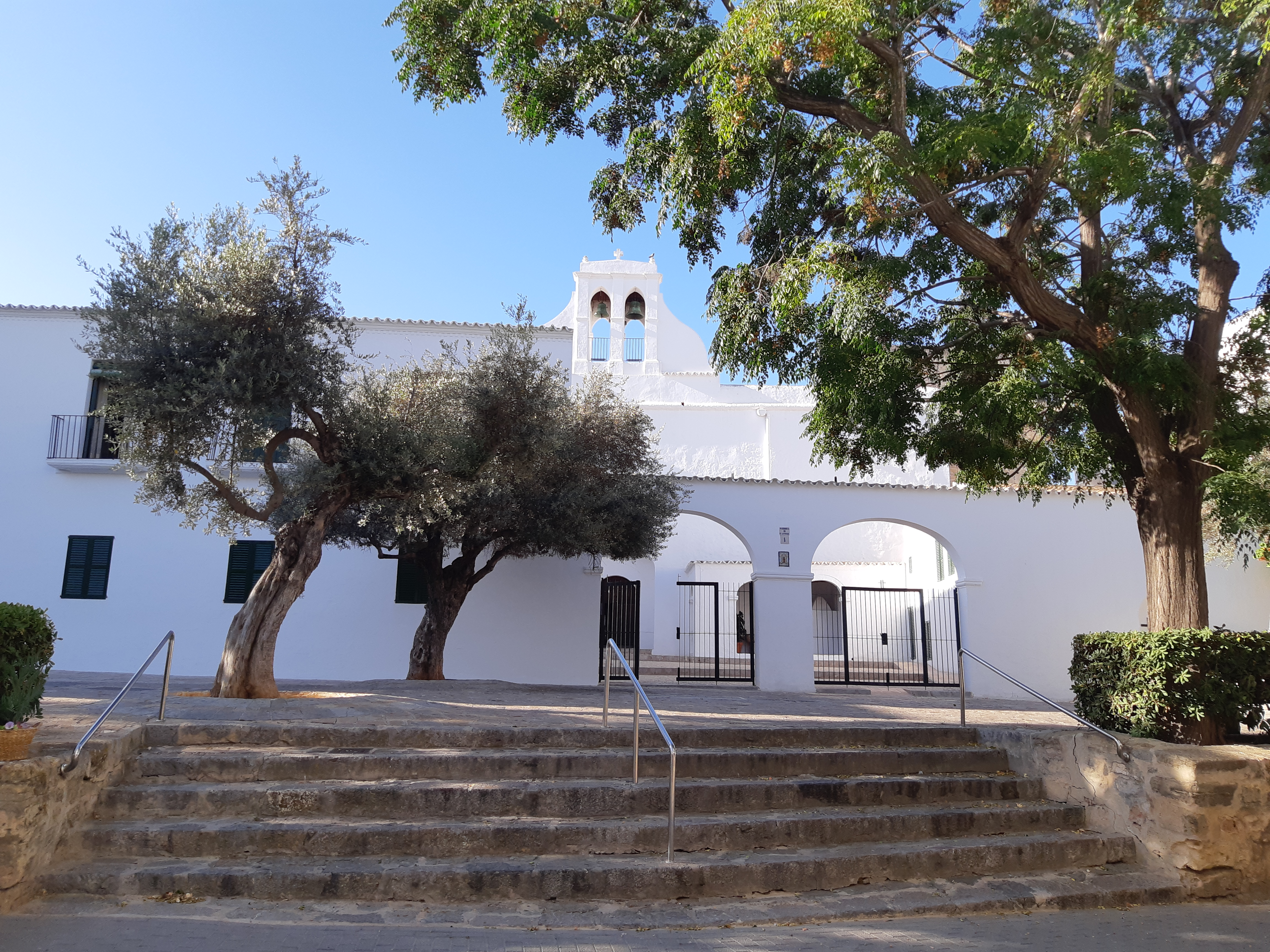
A church in Sant Antoni

== See also ==
- The Municipality of Sant Antoni de Portmany
