= Santa Agnès de Corona =

Santa Agnès de Corona (Santa Inés de Corona)
- Village
- Location of the village in Ibiza
- Coordinates: 39°2′8″N 1°20′9″E
- Country: Spain
- Region: Balearic Islands
- Time zone: UTC+1 (CET)
  - Summer (DST): UTC+2 (CEST)

Santa Agnès de Corona is a small village inland of the north central seaboard of the Spanish island of Ibiza. The village is in the municipality of Sant Antoni de Portmany and is located designated road EI-500. The village is 12.0 miles (19.3 km) northwest of Ibiza Town, and 5.9 kilometres (3.7 mi) to the northwest of the coastal town of Sant Antoni de Portmany.

== Location ==
The village is surrounded by gentle rolling countryside, and this region is full of orange, lemon and almond trees. The blossom season in January and February is spectacular and has given the area the status of a protected area of special interest. The village comprises a church, a supermarket, a few bars and a few surrounding houses and villas. There are one or two examples left of traditional rural house architecture.

=== The Parish Church ===
The parish church was built in 1812. The church is dedicated to the chaste and virtuous Saint Agnes. The main facade faces on to a small village square is very plain and has an uneven roofline. The elevation has an arched doorway and one round window. There is a porch to the side of the building. The church was built as part of religious reforms made on the island by Bishop Abad y Lasierra, the first Bishop of Ibiza. Inside there is a low vaulted nave. Also of interest, there is a sculpture of Our Lady of the Most Holy Rosary which dates to 1812, the same as the church, the sculptor’s name is unknown.

== Gallery ==
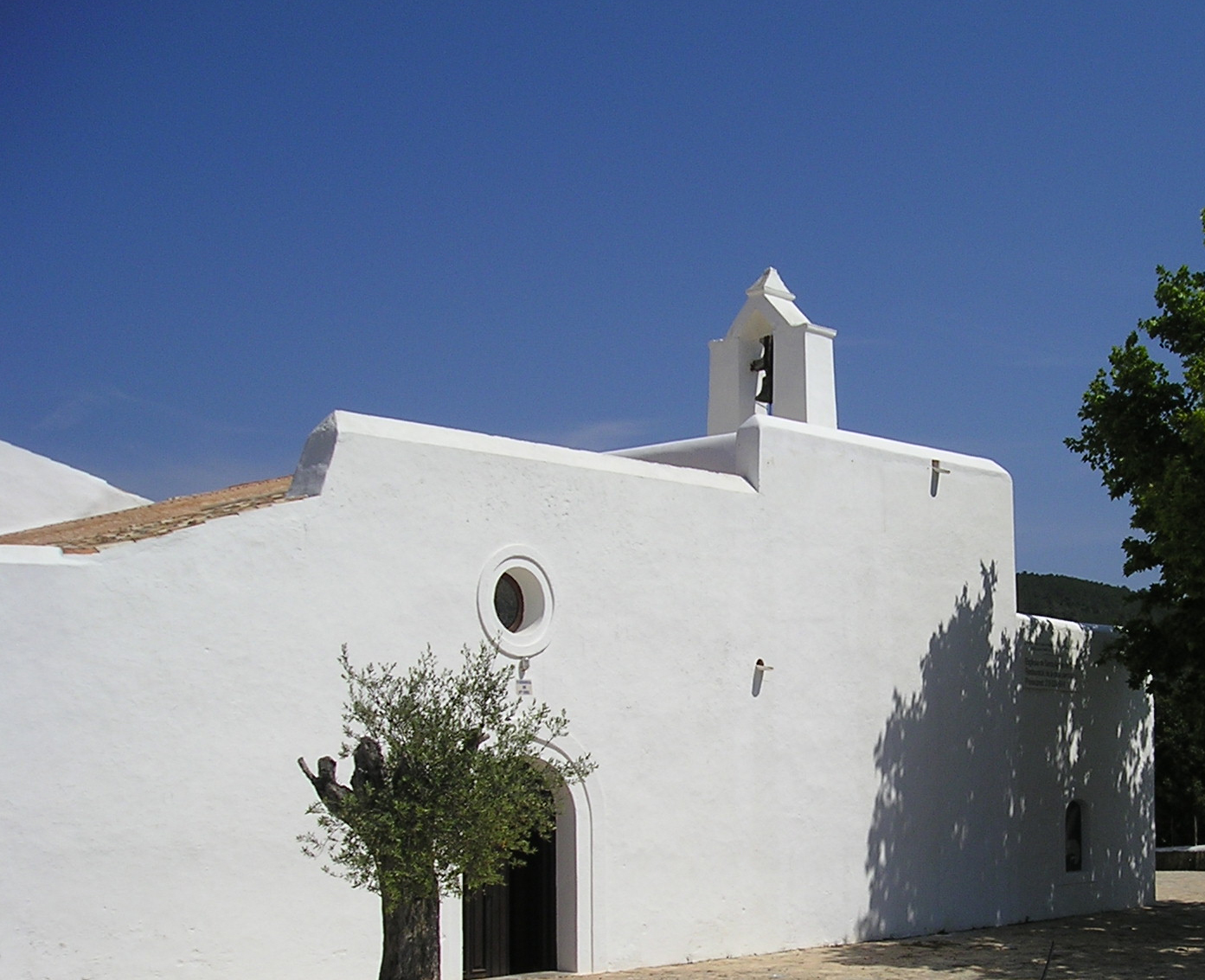
The parish church of Santa Agnès
