= Cala Romantica =

Beach in Majorca, Spain

Coordinates: 39°31′16″N 3°18′55″E

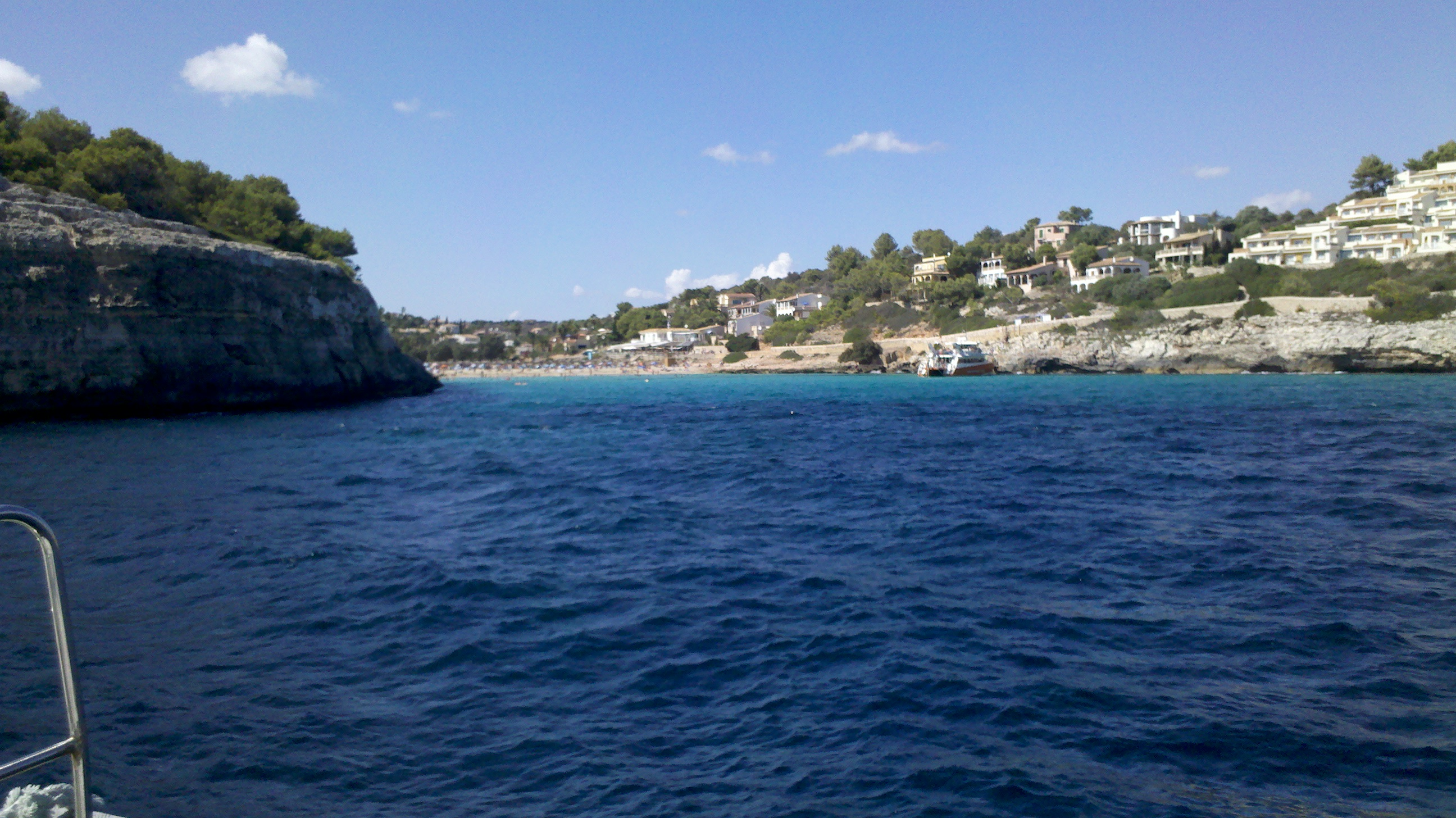
Cala Romàntica

Cala Romàntica or Playa Romàntica is a beach and resort on the east coast of Majorca, about 10 kilometres south of Porto Cristo, and east of the town of Manacor.
