= Édouard-Alfred Martel =

French cave explorer (1859–1938)

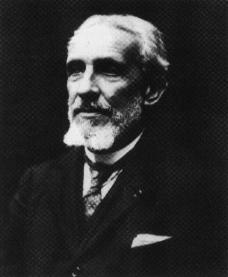
- Born: 1 July 1859; Pontoise, France
- Died: 3 June 1938 (aged 78); Montbrison, France
- Resting place: Montmartre Cemetery, Paris
- Education: Lycée Condorcet
- Occupation: Lawyer
- Known for: Father of modern speleology
- Awards: Commander of the Legion of Honour

Édouard-Alfred Martel (French pronunciation: [edwaʁalfʁɛd maʁtɛl]; 1 July 1859 – 3 June 1938) was a French lawyer who was a world pioneer of cave exploration, study, and documentation, hence becoming known as the "father of modern speleology". Martel explored thousands of caves in his native France and many other countries, popularised the pursuit of cave exploration, introduced the concept of speleology as a distinct area of scientific study, maintained an extensive archive, and in 1895 founded the Société de Spéléologie, the first organisation devoted to cave science in the world.

== Life and exploration ==
No man has gone before us in these depths, no one knows where we go nor what we see, nothing so strangely beautiful was ever presented to us, and spontaneously we ask each other the same question: are we not dreaming?

— É.-A. Martel, "Les causses du Languedoc",(the Karsts of Languedoc) Conférences de l'exposition universelle internationale de 1889

Édouard-Alfred Martel was born in Pontoise, Seine-et-Oise on 1 July 1859. Born into a family of lawyers, he studied at the Lycée Condorcet in Paris. Early on, he became passionate about geography and the natural sciences and in 1877 he won first prize in an open competition for geography. He was a great reader of the works of Jules Verne. In 1866, while holidaying with his parents, he visited the Caves of Gargas in the Pyrenees. Other trips allowed him to travel to Germany, Austria and Italy. In 1879, he visited Postojna Cave in Slovenia, an extensive cave system.

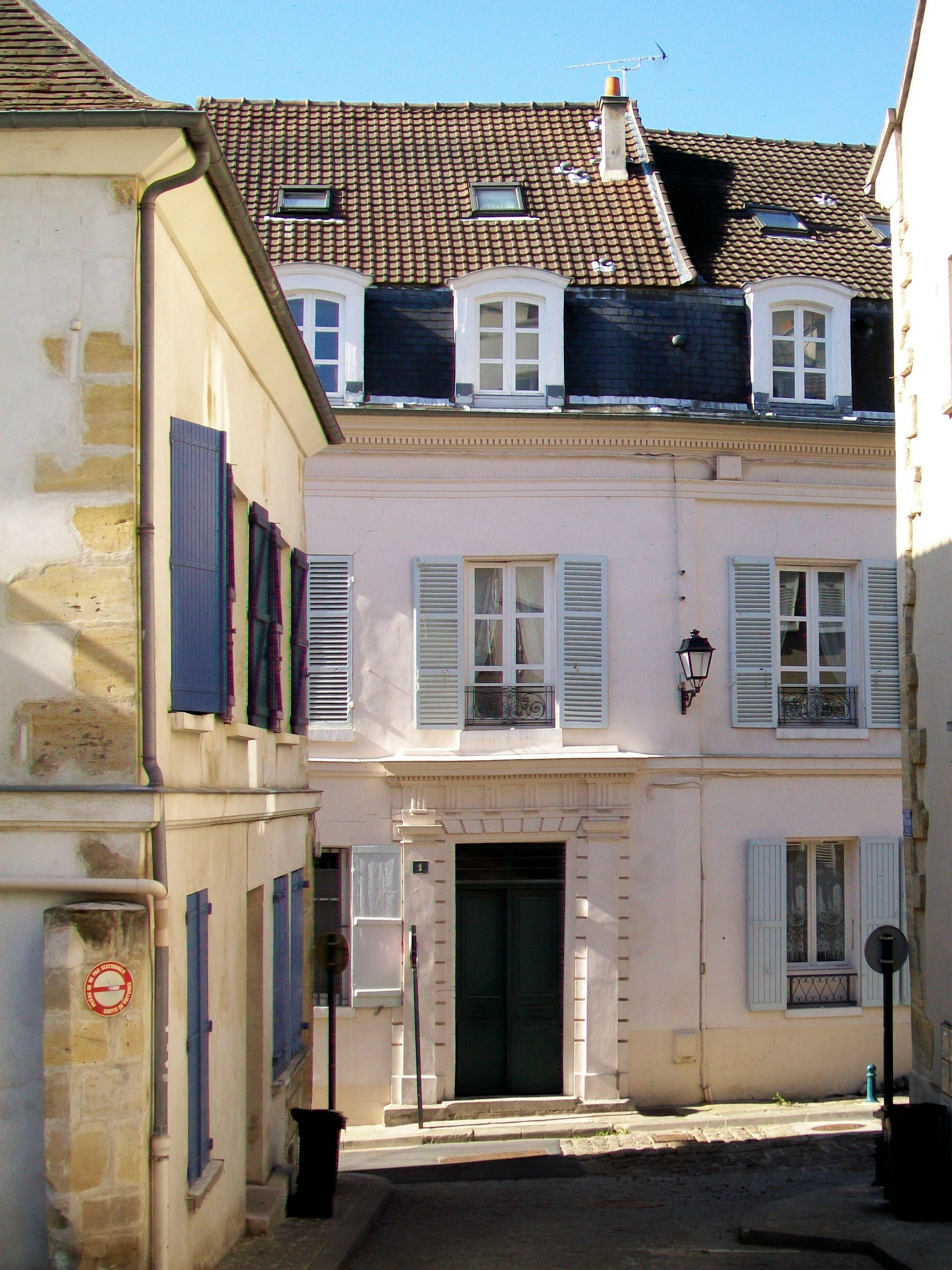
Birthplace of Édouard-Alfred Martel, 1 rue de la forêt Hardelot, Pontoise.

In 1886, after completing his military service, he earned a law degree and became a licensed attorney with the Commercial Court of the Seine. Martel devoted his leisure and holiday time to travels across France. From 1883, he conducted work on the karstic plateaus of the Causses, shaped by the gorges of the Tarn, Jonte, Dourbie and Lot.

In June 1888, he began his caving career in the Bramabiau gorge in Gard. He and several companions entered a rock cavity where a stream known as Bonheur sinks and reappears farther along the Bramabiau Gorge. That same June with the same team he explored the Dargilan Cave along the Jonte Gorge over a mile away. In 1889 he visited Padirac Cave, near Gramat. He climbed down the entrance chasm and reached an underground river at a depth of 100m. Martel and his cousin Gaupillat set off to explore with a canoe, discovering two kilometres of new passage. Martel later bought the Padirac Cave, and turned it into a show cave.

In July 1890 he married Aline de Launay, sister of Louis de Launay, a professor of geology and future member of the Academy of Sciences. Collaboration with Louis de Launay provided a scientific basis for some of Martel’s publications, including articles in the journal La Nature, which Martel and Launay were later editors. In 1894, he published The Abyss, a book in which he describes the wonders of the underworld he discovered and visited during the six seasons of exploration he undertook from 1888 to 1893. During this period, he visited and indexed more than 230 caves.

In 1895, he ventured further afield and organised an expedition to Ireland and England. He discovered the underground lake of Marble Arch in Northern Ireland. In Yorkshire he made the first complete descent, after a partial descent by Englishman John Birkbeck in 1842, into the pothole of Gaping Gill. He reached the Main Chamber, 170 feet lower than Birkbeck had ventured. That same year, he founded the Speleological Society and started a periodic newsletter, Spelunca.

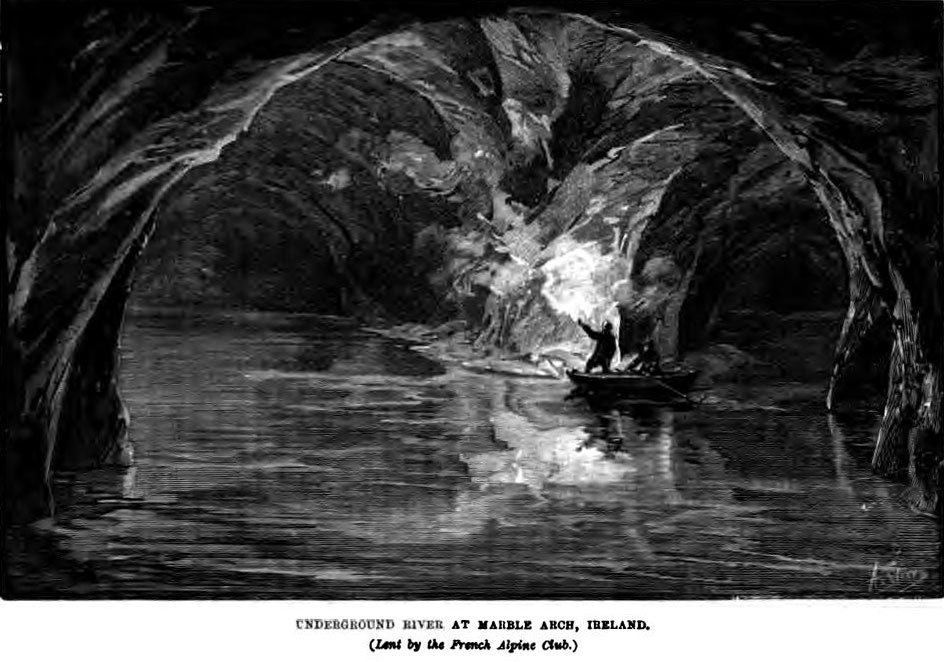
Drawing by Martel, depicting the first exploration of Marble Arch Caves in Ireland, 1895.

In 1896, he was invited by the Archduke Luis Salvator, a cousin of Emperor Franz Joseph of Austria, to visit their country. With his foreman and journeyman Louis Armand, he explored several caves on the island of Mallorca. In the Cave of Drach near Porto Cristo he discovered the largest underground lake known at the time.

Martel's explorations intensified around this time, prioritizing the exploration of the caves of Causses. He also explored the caves and caverns of the limestone regions of Savoie, Jura, Provence and the Pyrenees. He traveled throughout Europe, Belgium, Dalmatia, Bosnia and Herzegovina, Montenegro, where he investigated the course of the Trebišnjica, considered as one of the longest underground rivers in the world. In 1899 he finally left professional life to devote himself to his scientific research. He served as editor of La Nature from 1905 to 1909 and was a member of the Société de géographie, of which he was elected president. In 1912, he spent three days exploring in Mammoth Cave, Kentucky where he undertook scientific work including barometric determinations of the elevations of the cave's different levels. Martel was active in cave exploration from 1888–1914, recording some 1,500 caves during this time.

Edward Alfred Martel died 3 June 1938 in Saint-Thomas-la-Garde, near Montbrison in the Loire.

== Speleology ==
Throughout his life, Martel strongly promoted the study of speleology, striving to increase its recognition as a scientific field. In his own work, he published some 20 books and 780 articles during the course of his career. At least 53 of his articles were published outside France and several of these were translated into foreign languages. He also made regular trips abroad to conduct lectures on speleological subjects.

=== Société de Spéléologie ===
In 1895 in Paris, Martel founded the Société de Spéléologie, a scientific organisation which would regularly publish articles on speleology in its periodical, Spelunca. The formation of this society was one of the means by which he was able to turn speleology into an internationally recognised science, with many foreign authors publishing articles, many French authors publishing articles on foreign caves and with the society growing to include 33% foreign members by 1909.

== Bibliography ==
Martel wrote many books and articles about speleology, hydrology and geology, of which the most notable are listed here:

=== Books ===
- Les Cévennes (in French), Paris: Delagrave, 1890, 400 p. (12 editions)
- Les Abîmes (in French), Paris: Delagrave, 1894, ISBN 2-7348-0533-2, 580 p. (10 editions)
- Le massif de la Bernina (in collaboration with Lorria, A.) (in French), Zürich: Orell, 1895, 200 p.
- Irlande et cavernes anglaises (in French), Paris: Delagrave, 1897, 400 p.
- Le Trayas et L'Estérel (in French), Paris: Delagrave, 1899, 80 p.
- La Spéléologie (in French), Paris: Carre et Naud, 1900, 125 p.
- Le gouffre et la rivière souterraine de Padirac (in French), Paris: Delagrave, 1901, 180 p.
- La Photographie souterraine (in French), Paris: Gauthier-Villars, 1903, 70 p.
- La spéléologie aux XXe siècle (in French), Paris: Hermann, 1905, 810 p.
- Le sol et l'eau – Traité d'hygiène (in collaboration with de Launay, Ogier and Bonjean) (in French), Paris: Baillere, 1906, 486 p.
- L'évolution souterraine (in French), Paris: Flammarion, 1908, 388 p.
- La Côte d'azur russe: Riviera du Caucase (in French), Paris: Delagrave, 1909, 423 p.
- Les cavernes et les rivières souterraines de la Belgique (Van den Broeck, E, Martel, E.-A. and Rahir, Ed.) (in French), Bruxelles: Lamertin, 1910, (2 vol.) 1800 p.
- Explications sur Mammoth Cave (in French), 1914
- Nouveau Traité des eaux souterraines (in French), Paris: Doin, 1921, 840 p.
- Les causses et gorges du Tarn (in French), Millau: Artieres et Maury, 1926, 512 p.
- L'Aven Armand (in French), Millau: Artieres et Maury, 1927, 48 p.
- La France ignorée (2 vol.) (in French), Paris: Delagrave, 1928–1930, 600 p.
- Les Grands Causses (Les Causses majeurs) (in French), Millau: Artières et Maury, 1936, 510 p.

=== Articles ===
- "Le Cañon du Tarn", Annuaire du Club Alpin Français (in French), 1883
- "Le Causse Noir et Montpellier-le-Vieux", Annuaire du Club Alpin Français (in French), 1884
- "Sous Terre", Annuaire du Club Alpin Français (in French), Paris: Club alpin français, 1888
- "Les causses du Languedoc" (PDF). Conférences de l'exposition universelle internationale de 1889 (in French). Paris. 5 September 1889.
- "Sur la température des cavernes", Comptes rendus de l'Académie des sciences (in French), 118: 615–617, 1894
- "Sous Terre (8^{e} campagne) Marble Arch, Irlande et Gaping Ghyll, Angleterre", Annuaire du Club Alpin Français (in French), 22, Paris: Club alpin français: 171–209, 1895
- "Sur le gouffre de Gaping-Ghyll (Angleterre)", Comptes rendus de l'Académie des sciences (in French), 122: 51–53, 1896
- "Sur quelques anomalies de la température des sources", Comptes rendus de l'Académie des sciences (in French), 122: 97–99, 1896
- "Sur des observations d'hiver dans les cavernes des Causses (Padirac, etc.)", Comptes rendus de l'Académie des sciences (in French), 122: 903–905, 1896
- "Sur les siphons des sources et des rivières souterraines", Comptes rendus de l'Académie des sciences (in French), 122: 1147–1150, 1896
- "Sur la Cueva del Drach (Grotte du Dragon) dans l'île Majorque", Comptes rendus de l'Académie des sciences (in French), 124: 1385–1388, 1897
- "Sur l'hydrographie souterraine et les chouruns du Dévoluy (Hautes-Alpes)", Comptes rendus de l'Académie des sciences (in French), 124: 1170–1173, 1897
- "Sur la contamination de la source de Sauve (Gard)", Comptes rendus de l'Académie des sciences (in French), 125: 897–900, 1897
- Martel, É.-A.; Viré, A. (1897), "Sur l'aven Armand (Lozère) (profondeur 207 m)", Comptes rendus de l'Académie des sciences (in French), 125: 622–625
- Martel, E. A. (1897), "British Caves and Speleology", The Geographical Journal, X (5): 500–511, doi:10.2307/1774383, JSTOR 1774383
- "Spelunca", Spelunca, 74, Paris

== See also ==
- Herbert E. Balch
