= Àrea natural d'especial interès =

Protected area within the Balearic Islands, Spain

A Natural Area of Special Interest (Spanish: Área Natural de Especial Interés, Catalan: Área natural d'especial interès; acronym: ANEI) is a protected area within the Balearic Islands, Spain that is below the level of a natural park.

The law creating ANEIs, Law 1/1991, enacted on January 30, designated 47 ANEIs in Mallorca, 19 on Menorca, 10 on Ibiza and 8 on Formentera.

== List of ANEIs ==
=== ANEIs on Majorca ===
- Puig de Maria, Pollença
- S'Albufereta, Pollença
- Sa Punta Manresa
- La Victòria, Alcúdia
- Puig de Sant Martí, Alcúdia
- Serra de Son Fe
- S'Albufera, Sa Pobla, Muro, Alcúdia
- Sa Canova d'Artà, Artà
- Cala Mesquida-Cala Agulla, Capdepera
- Puig Segué
- S'Heretat
- Cap Vermell
- Torrent de Canyamel
- Serra de Son Jordi
- Sa Punta de Capdepera, Capdepera
- Sa Punta i s'Algar, Felanitx
- Punta Negra-Cala Mitjana
- Mondragó
- Cap de ses Salines
- Es Trenc-Salobrar de Campos, Campos
- Marina de Llucmajor
- Cap Enderrocat
- Es Carnatge des Coll d'en Rabassa, Palma
- Cap de Cala Figuera-Refeubeig, Calvià
- Cap Andritxol, Andratx
- Cap des Llamp
- Es Saulet
- Massís de Randa
- Sant Salvador-Santueri, Felanitx
- Puig de ses Donardes
- Es Fangar
- Dunes de Son Real, Santa Margalida
- Muntanyes d'Artà
- Punta de n'Amer, Sant Llorenç
- Cales de Manacor
- Na Borges
- Calicant, Manacor i Sant Llorenç
- Consolació
- Puig de Sant Miquel, Montuïri
- Son Cos
- Gariga de Son Caulelles
- Puig de Son Seguí
- Puig de Son Nofre
- Puig de Bonany
- Puig de Santa Magdalena, Inca
- Barrancs de Son Gual i Xorrigo, Palma
- Àrees naturals de la Serra de Tramuntana

=== ANEIs on Menorca ===
- Costa nord de Ciutadella
- La Vall
- Dels Alocs a Fornells
- La Mola i s'Albufera de Fornells
- Bellavista
- D'Addaia a s'Albufera
- S'Albufera des Grau
- De s'Albufera a la Mola
- Sant Isidre-Binisermenya
- Cala Sant Esteve-Caló d'en Rafalet
- De Biniparratx a Llucalcari
- Son Bou i Barranc de sa Vall
- De Binigaus a Cala Mitjana
- Costa Sud de Ciutadella
- Son Oliveret
- Camí de Baig (Degollador)
- Santa Àgueda-s'Enclusa
- El Toro
- Penyes d'Egipte

=== ANEIs on Ibiza ===
- Ses Salines
- Puig de Mussona i Puig de s'Eixeró
- Cap Llibrell
- Cala Jondal
- Cap Llentrisca-Sa Talaiassa
- Cala Compta-Cala Bassa
- Serra de ses Fontanelles-Serragrossa
- Del Puig d'en Basseta al Puig d'en Mussons
- Àrees Naturals dels Amunts d'Eivissa
  - De Cala Salada al Port de Sant Miquel
  - Serra de Sant Mateu d'Aubarca
  - Del Port de Sant Miquel a Xarraca
  - De Xarraca a Sant Vicent de sa Cala
  - Punta Grossa
  - Serra Grossa de Sant Joan
- Massís de Sant Carles
  - Serra des Llamp
  - Cap Roig
  - Talàia de Sant Carles

=== ANEIs on Formentera ===
- Ses Salines-S'Estany Pudent
- S'Estany des Peix
- Es Cap Alt
- Cap de Barbaria
- Es pi d'en Català
- Platja de Migjorn i costa Tramuntana
- La Mola
- Punta Prima
