= Mola Fortress =

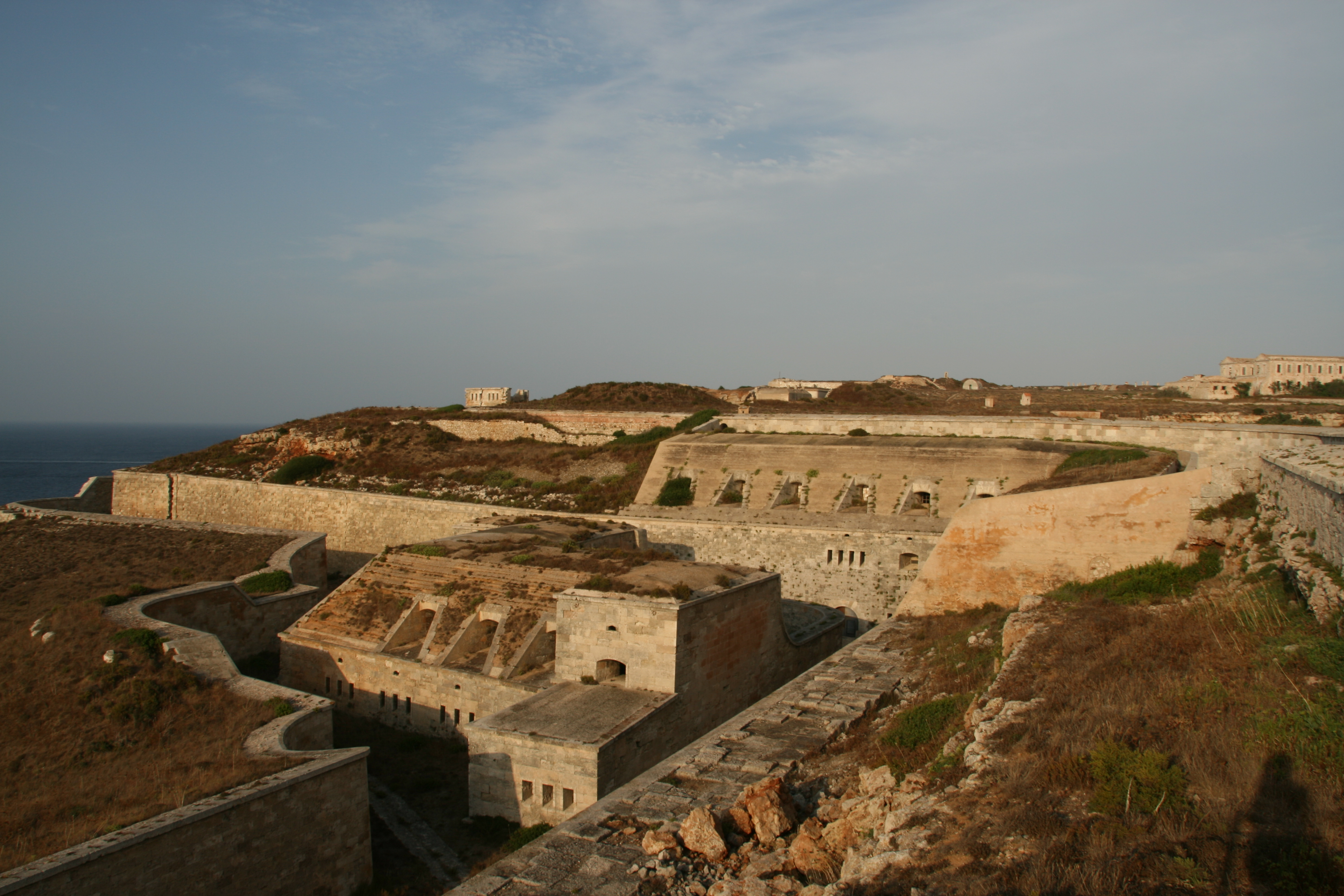

Site information
- Type: Fortification
- Condition: Restored

Site history
- Built: 1849-1875
- Materials: stone

The Isabela II Fortress or La Mola Fortress is a Spanish military complex located on the Mola peninsula, at the entrance to the port of Mahón, on the island of Menorca, opposite the castillo de San Felipe, which protects the entrance to the port from the other side of the mouth. Next to this fortress is the easternmost point of Spain.

Its name comes from Queen Isabella II, who ordered it to be built in the mid-19th century.

== History ==
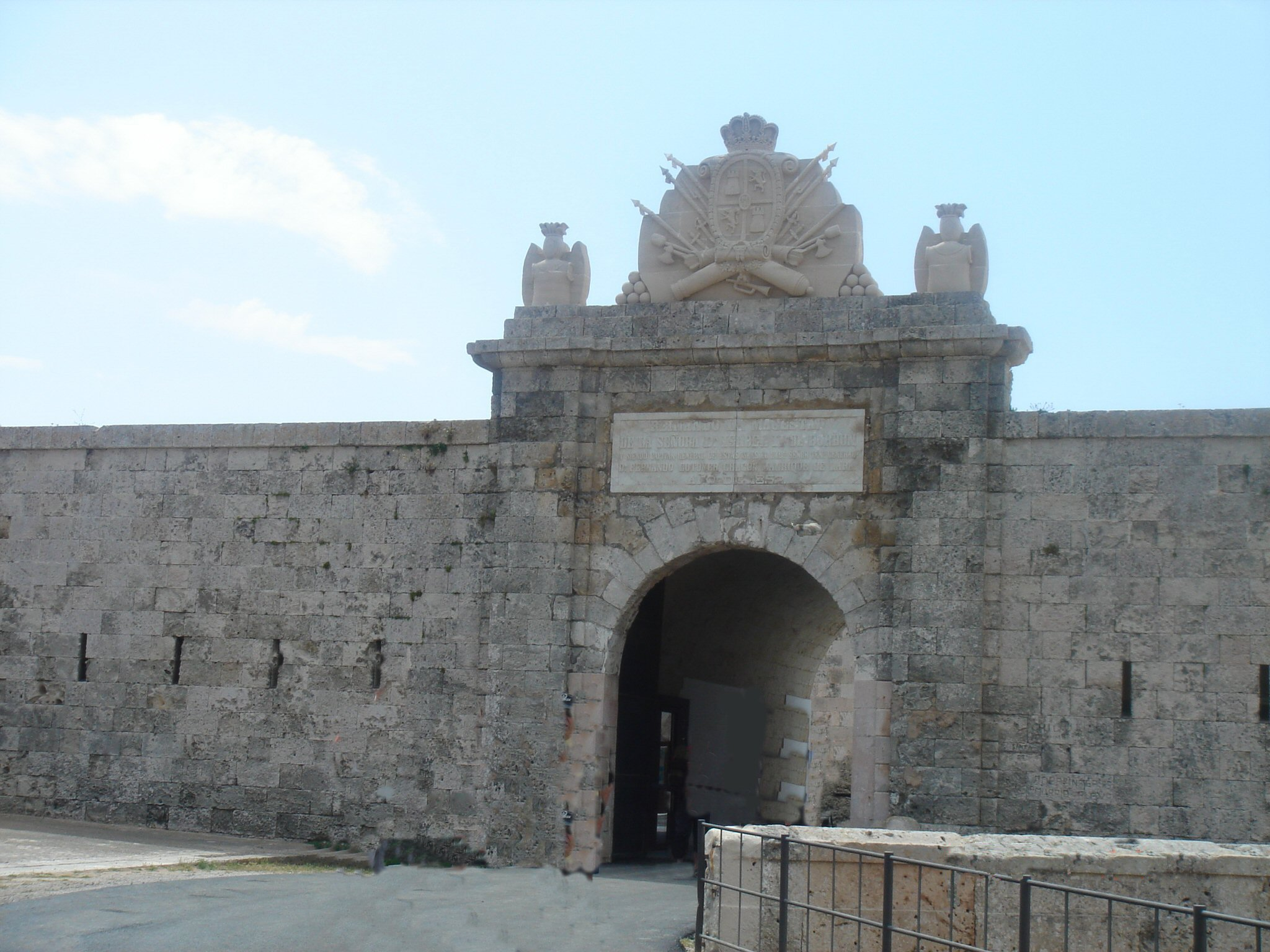
Entrance

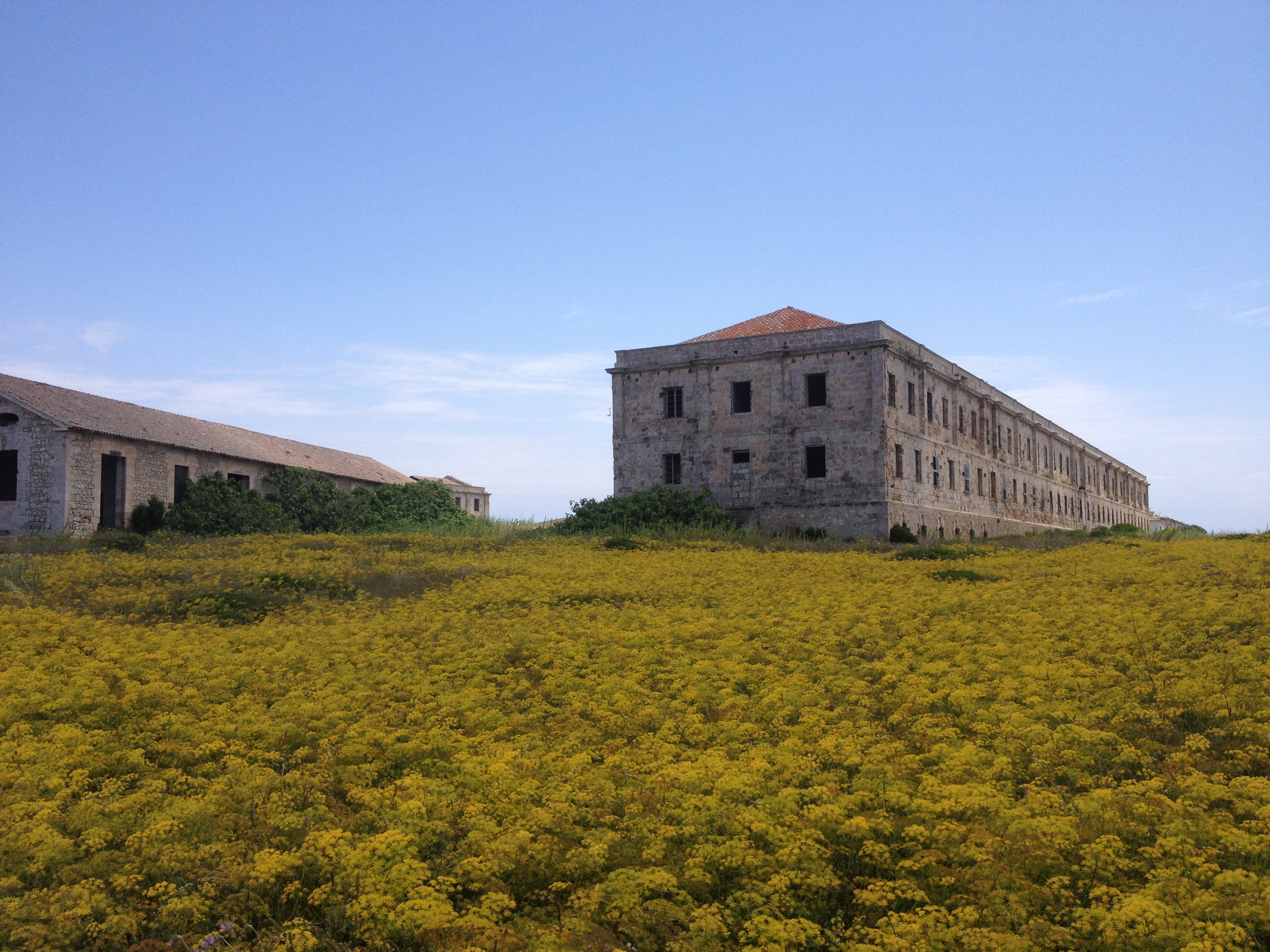
View of one of the buildings that housed the soldiers inside the fortress of Isabella II

Mahón harbour's military significance has been evident since the 16th century, serving Spanish connections to Italy, later becoming a key British naval base in the Mediterranean, and finally, a crossroads for 19th-century French and British shipping routes. Its large, deep, and wind-sheltered waters made it one of the Mediterranean's most secure ports, famously praised by Admiral Andrea Doria: "June, July, August, and the port of Mahón, are the best harbours in the Mediterranean".

Early fortifications included Saint Philip's Castle (1555), expanded under Spanish rule.

The military importance of the port of Mahón has been very clear for centuries, especially since the 16th century, when political conditions made it a maritime port of call for the Spanish Crown to connect with its Italian possessions. Later, during the British rule of Menorca, it was the support port for the English Mediterranean fleet, and finally, in the 19th century, it became the crossroads of the French route from Toulon to Algiers with the English Mediterranean route from Gibraltar to Malta.

=== British rule ===
The fortification was expanded and reinforced by the British after 1708 with a double enclosure and Fort Marlborough. Plans to develop did date based to 1541 but were only realised when the English began Saint Anne's fort in 1708, although it remained incomplete. In 1799. The British added two defense towers on La Mola: Saint Clair and Erskine.

The current La Mola fortress, built after demolishing Saint Philip's Castle, arose from 19th-century tensions following France's occupation of Algeria and growing Anglo-French rivalries. With Minorca defenseless, Spain fortified the island, spurred by fears that Britain might intervene to prevent control by another power. Following the demolition of the San Felipe castle, in 1850 work began on the fortress, built on the Mola peninsula, in the port, with three objectives: to defend the port, to constitute the base of operations for all the Army forces on the island and to serve as a security stronghold, ultimately, for said forces.

The fortification was inaugurated in 1852, still incomplete, and in 1860, Queen Isabel II visited the works. By the time its construction was completed, in 1875, it had already become outdated due to the evolution in artillery technology, so, in 1896, modern batteries were installed around the coast of the peninsula and cannons with a range of about 40 km.

The fortified area includes the Princess Tower, one of the two towers built on the Mola peninsula by the English in 1799, during their third occupation of the island.

The fortress of Isabel II (popularly called the fortress of La Mola due to its location on the Mola peninsula), is a Spanish work, started after the demolition of the castle of San Felipe, as a consequence of the reactivation of international tensions in the Western Mediterranean, when France occupied Algeria.

=== Modern era ===
In November 2007, the Government signed an agreement with the Ministry of Defence under which the latter gave it the old Punta Afuera defence installation for a period of 15 years, extendable up to a maximum of 75; for its part, the Government committed to its rehabilitation in order to dedicate this space to the creation of a centre for scientific purposes.

The area surrounding La Mola boasts distinctive geomorphological features that have fostered habitats supporting endemic plant species and serving as nesting grounds for endangered seabirds. This region is designated both as a Natural Area of Special Interest (ANEI) and a Special Protection Area for Birds (ZEPA).
