= Agulla =

Agulla may refer to:

== People ==
- Belisario Agulla (born 1988), Argentine rugby union player
- Horacio Agulla, Argentine rugby union player

== Other uses ==
- Agulla (snakefly), a snakefly genus
- Agulla, an element of a castell (a human tower)
- Cala Agulla, a beach in Majorca
