= Coves dels Hams =

Cave system on Mallorca

- "Fishhook Caves" - Englishdel
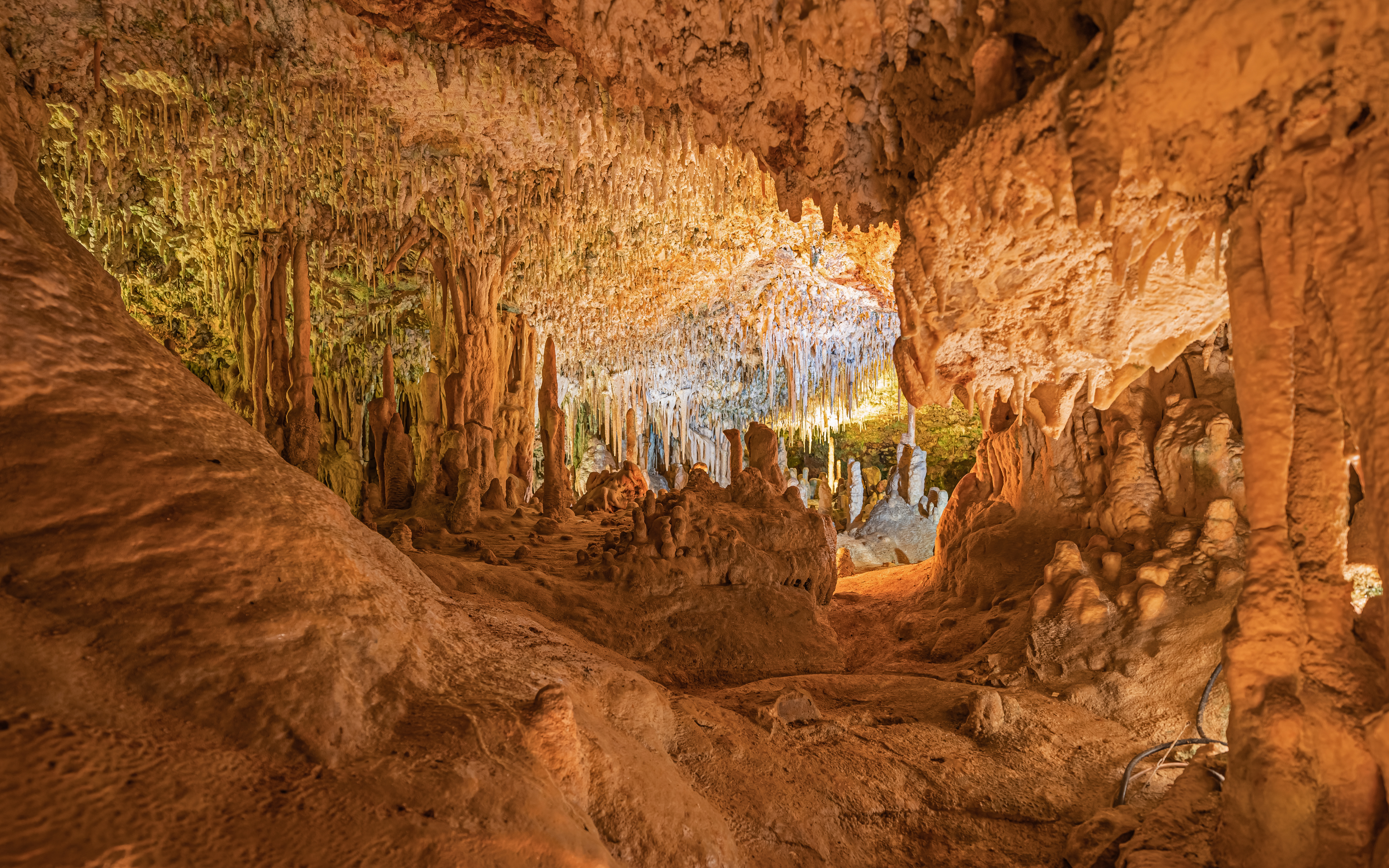
- Interactive map of Coves dels Hams
- Location: Porto Cristo, Mallorca, Spain
- Coordinates: 39°32′45″N 3°19′12″E
- Discovery: 2 March 1905
- Geology: Dripstone cave

The Coves dels Hams (Catalan pronunciation: [ˈkɔβəz ðəlz ˈams]; Spanish: Cuevas dels Hams; "Fishhook Caves") are a solutional cave system on the east coast of the Spanish Balearic Island of Mallorca. The caves are in the municipality of Manacor, about 1 km to the west of the town of Porto Cristo.

Alongside the larger Coves del Drach ("Cavern of the Dragon"), the Coves dels Hams contribute to the cavernous tourist attractions in the eastern region of the island.

== Description ==
The caves were discovered on 2 March 1905 by Pedro Caldentey. The caves lie along the route between the regional capital of Manacor and the coastal town of Porto Cristo. Like Coves del Drach, the Coves dels Hams hold an underground lake, which is known as "The Sea of Venice". The caves get their name from the unique formations of the stalactites and stalagmites. Hams is the Mallorquí (local dialect of Catalan) word for fishhooks or harpoons. Scientists have yet to explain the cause of these unique formations.

Lorenzo Caldentey, a son of the discoverer, is a certified diver and has outfitted the caves with an electric lighting system for performances and tours. Multilingual tour guides lead visitors on a roughly 500 meter walk through 12 different areas of the caves. Currently the visitors also enjoy the "Magical Mozart" concert accompanied by a light show. The musicians navigate the "Sea of Venice" in a small rowboat with candle-lit railings. The caves are a popular tourist attraction for tour groups and individual visitors during the summer months.

== See also ==
- Caving in the Balearic Islands
