= Armand Bouat =

French politician

Armand Bouat (31 March 1873 in Padirac — 11 August 1929 in Neuilly-sur-Seine) was a French politician and merchant. He was elected to the French National Assembly in 1924 from the Lot constituency, as a Radical Socialist candidate. Bouat became mayor of Martel in 1925. He was re-elected to the National Assembly in 1928.
