= Padirac Cave =

Pit cave near Gramat, in the Occitanie region, Franc

Coordinates: 44°51′28.98″N 01°45′0.50″E

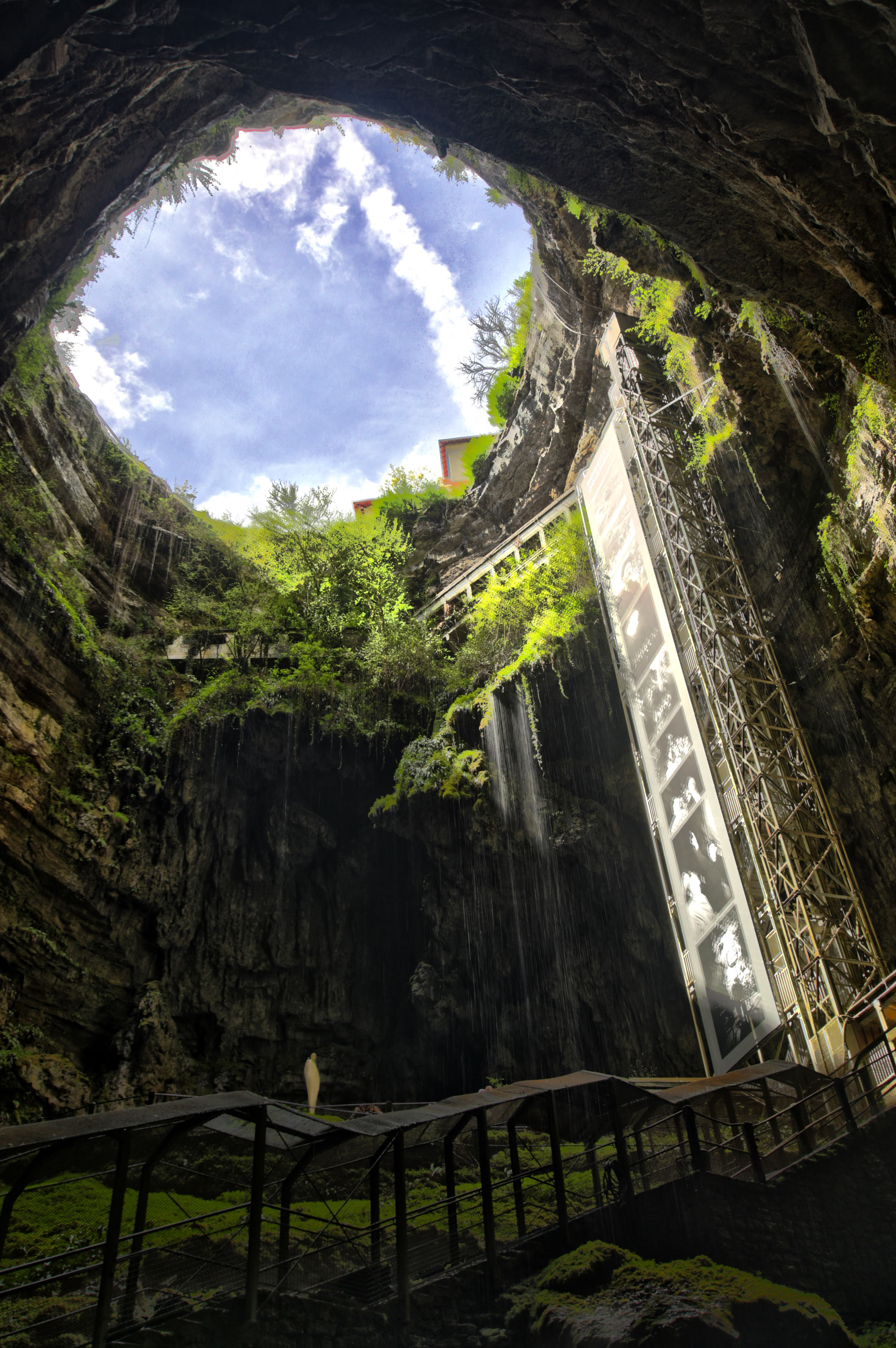
Padirac Chasm

The Padirac Chasm (French: Gouffre de Padirac) is a cave located near Gramat, in the Lot department, Occitanie region, France.

== Features ==
The chasm itself is 103 m (338 ft) deep, with a diameter of approximately 33 metres (108 ft). Visitors descend 75 m (246 ft) via a lift or a staircase before entering into the cave system. The cave contains a subterranean river system that is partly negotiable by boat, and it is regarded as "one of the most extraordinary natural phenomena of the Massif Central". The Padirac river continues underground for about 16 km (9.9 mi) until it flows into the Dordogne at the Montvalent Cirque.

== Formation ==
The chasm was created at an undetermined point in time when the roof collapsed into a large internal cavern. It is known that the cavern existed in the 3rd century, and was inhabited during the 15th and 16th centuries, when potassium nitrate was excavated from the area.

== Tourism ==
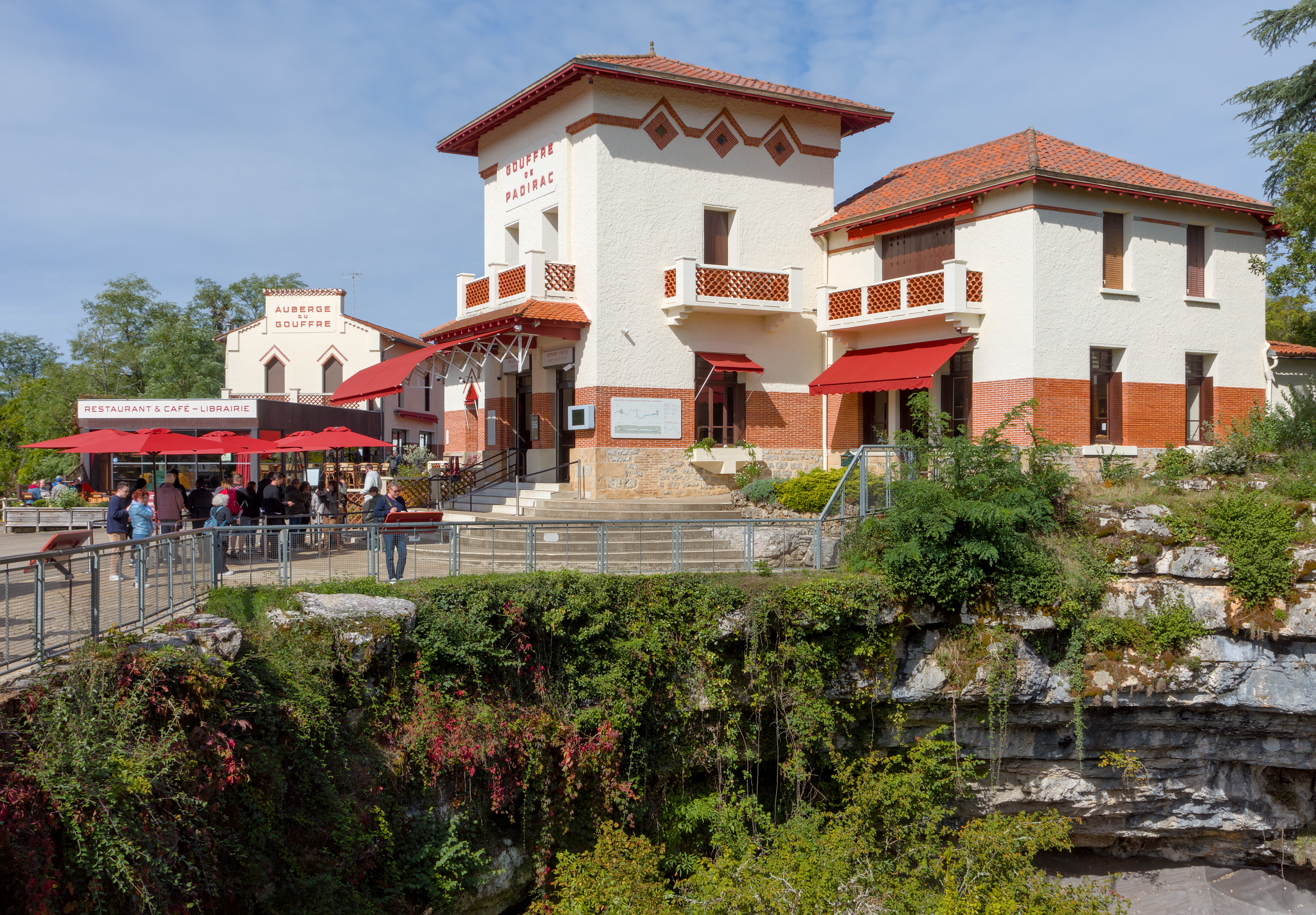
The visitor centre, with the chasm in the foreground.

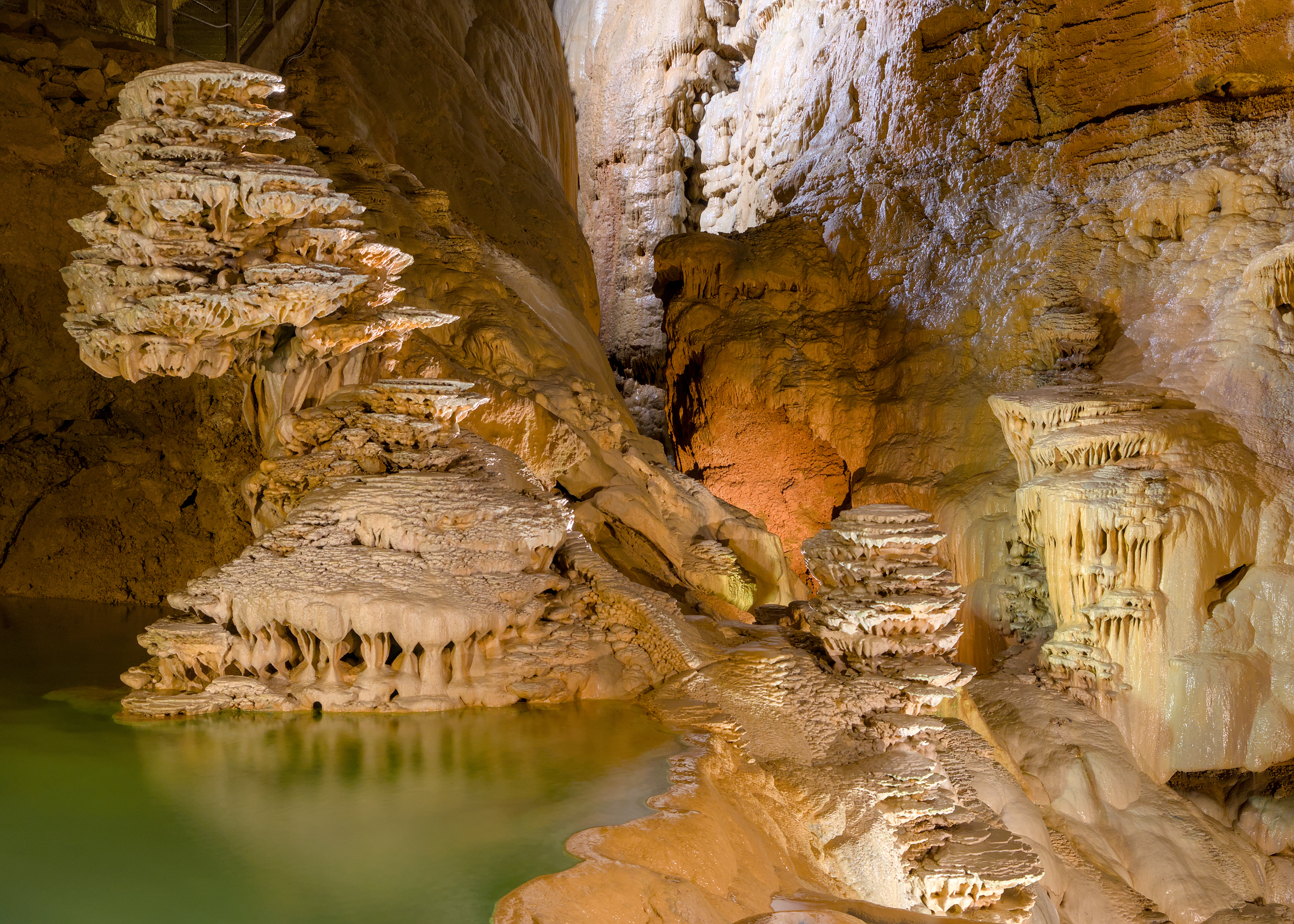
Karst formations near the upper lake.

The first tourists visited the cave on 1 November 1898; however, the site was officially opened for tourism on 10 April 1899 by Georges Leygues, the 87th Prime Minister of France (then called président du conseil). Today, although the chasm system is made up of more than 40 km (25 mi) of galleries, only 2 km (1.2 mi) have been opened for tourism.

Since the 1930s, visitors can access the cave system by descending 75 metres (246 ft) by lift or stairs, and then exploring the chasm system on foot and by boat.

Padirac is the most frequently visited underground tourism facility in France, with more than 350,000 visitors annually, and a record of 460,000 in 1991.

== Exploration ==
The chasm was first explored, in 1889, by Édouard-Alfred Martel. Much of the credit for opening the cave system is owed to Guy de Lavaur (1903–1986), who came to Padirac in 1938 and managed to penetrate 15 km (9.3 mi) of the passages.
