= Simó Ballester =

Spanish politician

Simó Ballester (Manacor ?, Palma de Mallorca 1457), nicknamed Tort, was a leading figure in the social conflicts in Mallorca between the peasants and the privileged people of the city of Palma. He was a peasant and, according to the historian J.M. Quadrado, he is considered to be one of the principal leaders of the riots, along with Jaume Nicolau and Bartomeu Moner.

In July 1450 he participated in the first siege of the city, as a head of an army of 2000 peasants. At the beginning of 1451 he negotiated with the governor, but without agreement. In April, the city was besieged a second time.

After a third siege in May, King Alfons V decided to intervene, and in August 1452 he sent an army that defeated the insurrectionists in the battle of Rafal Garcés.

In 1456 he went to Menorca. Sometime later he was executed.
