= Es Fangar =

Agricultural estate in Manacor, Mallorca, Spain

- Es Fangar
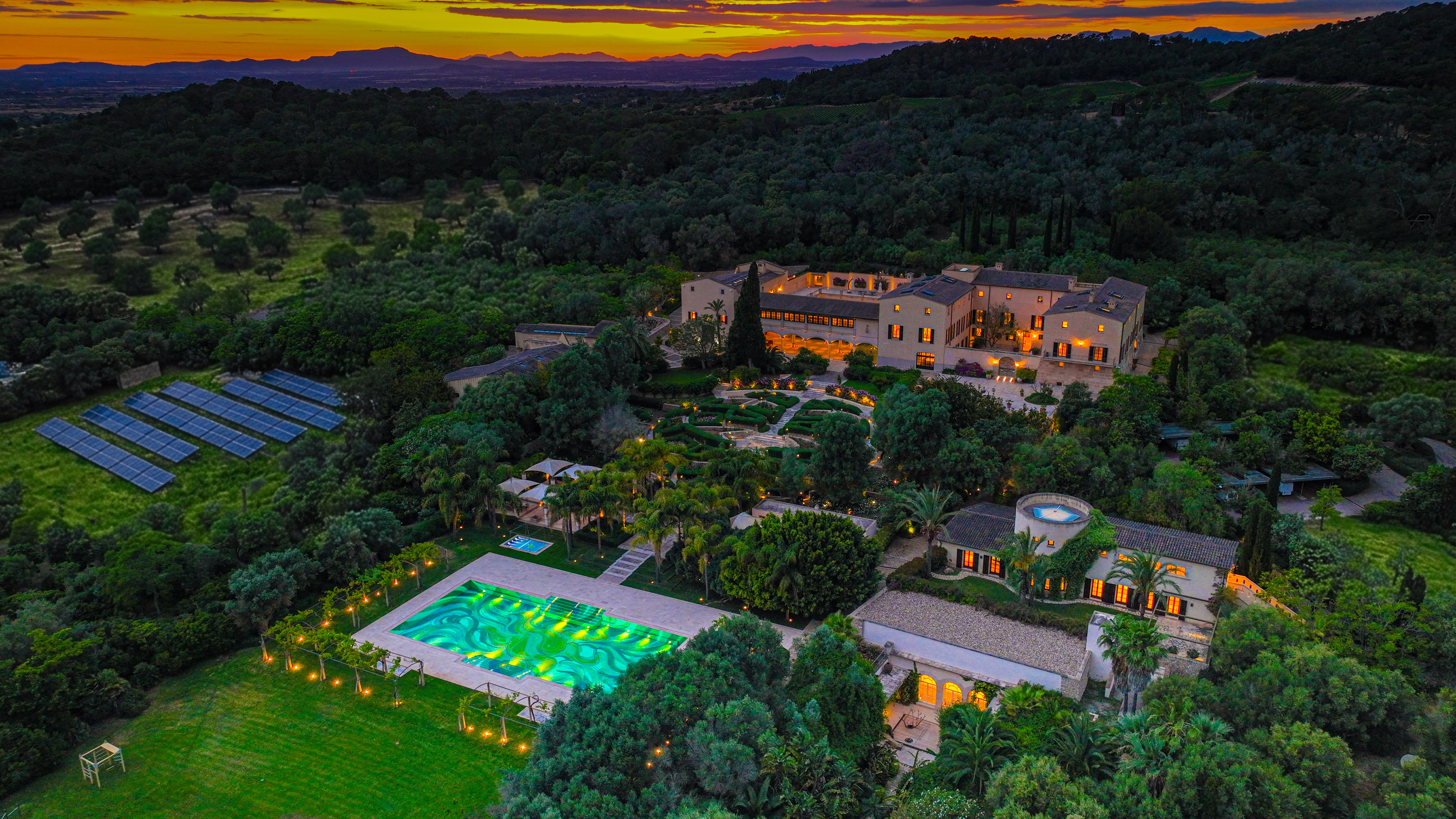
- Main house of the possessió Es Fangar, Son Macià

General information
- Type: Possessió (Mallorcan agricultural estate)
- Location: Son Macià, Manacor, Balearic Islands, Spain
- Coordinates: 39°29′42″N 3°12′08″E
- Completed: First documented 1323
- Owner: Finca Es Fangar S.A.U.

Website
- es-fangar.com

Es Fangar is a historic possessió southeast of Son Macià in the municipality of Manacor, Mallorca, adjoining Felanitx. It is the largest estate in Manacor and has been described as one of the largest privately held properties on the island, covering a little over 1,000 hectares in recent accounts and is the biggest Finca on Mallorca, accounting for about 0.27% of the entire island.

First recorded in 1323, it belonged for more than five centuries to the Truyols (Trullols) family, later marquises de la Torre del Fangar, and then to the Bonnín family. In 2002 Peter Eisenmann and Sabine Eisenmann acquired it and returned neglected farmland to organic cultivation. The estate produces wine in the Pla i Llevant denomination of origin — certified organic and sold as vegetarian and vegan — as well as olive oil, and runs a Hanoverian stud that staged international dressage shows in 2015 and 2016, including Spain's first CDI5*.

Much of the land lies in the protected natural area (ANEI) of Es Fangar. The buildings are listed in Manacor's municipal heritage catalogue. The property has been offered for sale since 2020.

== Geography ==
The estate occupies the Serres de Llevant in south-eastern Mallorca and crosses the Manacor–Felanitx boundary. Sa Mola des Fangar (about 317–318 m) forms part of the traditional divide between the Llevant and Migjorn districts. The enclosed valley setting has been described as giving the property a sheltered microclimate.

Recent reporting gives just over 1,000 hectares, or 1,064 hectares; a 2004 account gave 1,800. The historic holding was far larger — on the order of 3,000 hectares — before parcels were sold.

The statutory ANEI des Fangar covers 1,148 hectares in the catchment of the Torrent des Fangar. It includes limestone hills, cliffs, pinewood and garrigue, and is one of the larger protected spaces in Manacor. Contemporary accounts of the restored estate separately describe about 400 hectares left as uncultivated land, with watering stations for wildlife including goats, tortoises, rabbits, hares and raptors. Three archaeological sites are recorded on the property, among them the Cova des Picot and the prehistoric caves of n'Amarat.

== History ==
=== Truyols family ===
The estate is first documented in 1323, already in the name of Nicolau Truiols (Trullols). It remained with the family into the late nineteenth century. In 1406 Nicolau Trullols complained that people from Manacor and Felanitx had cut timber on the land and fished with poison in a coastal pond at Cala Murada.

A 1578 valuation assessed the property at 10,000 lliures. It then operated as a large mixed holding with cereal land and a flock of more than 500 sheep, and comprised the cases (manor house), a tower, a chapel, a molí de sang (animal-powered mill) and a celler. The oratory was built in 1843, originally dedicated to the crucified Christ and later to Nostra Senyora del Carme.

In 1728 Philip V confirmed the title of marquis de la Torre del Fangar, named after the estate the family had held since the fourteenth century. The historian Ramon Rosselló Vaquer published a study of the estate's lords and their relations with Felanitx in 2007.

=== Bonnín family ===
In 1896 the estate was purchased by Gaspar Bonnín Miró, a returning indià from Felanitx, and passed to his son Pere Joan Bonnín Armstrong. In 1991 it was contributed to the company Bonarms SA, later renamed Finca Es Fangar S.A.

=== Restoration under the Eisenmann family ===
Peter Eisenmann, a German industrialist, and Sabine Eisenmann, based in Gstaad, bought the estate from Pedro J. Bonnín in 2002 for 13.8 million euros (some later reports give 2001 and a rounded figure of just over 13 million). Contemporary accounts described agricultural land that had slipped into scrub and low woodland. The new owners replanted vines and olives, restored the historic buildings and developed organic farming, a winery and a stud as the working basis of the estate.

== Heritage ==
The possessió is entered in the Catàleg d'Elements i Espais Protegits of Manacor, approved by the town council on 30 November 2021, at the highest municipal grade of integral protection. Later extensions have been noted as altering the earlier outline of the building complex.

== Wine and farming ==
The estate is farmed organically and produces wine, olive oil, figs and almonds. Press accounts have called it the largest organically managed finca in the Balearic Islands. An apiary of more than twenty colonies has been reported, with several hives kept near the vines.

Field names recorded on the property — including Son Cotinel·lo, Sa Vinya Vella d'es Fangar and Sa Vinya des Conill — and the remains of an old cellar indicate earlier viticulture before phylloxera and later abandonment. Vines were replanted from the mid-2000s.

=== Wine ===
Es Fangar Vins is a producer in the Pla i Llevant denomination of origin, with about 56 hectares of vineyard combining indigenous varieties — Callet, Manto Negro, Giró Ros and Prensal Blanc — with international ones including Chardonnay, Cabernet Sauvignon, Merlot and Syrah. The wines are certified organic and sold as vegetarian and vegan. Daniel Morales was the long-serving winemaker; trade profiles note training in Priorat and South Africa.

A winery in the Son Colom industrial estate at Felanitx was built from 2014 at a reported cost of about 8 million euros. Grapes were being processed there by 2016; the public facilities are usually dated to 2019. The building covers some 7,500 square metres and contains 48 tanks of 12,000 litres for red wine, a 20,000-litre blending tank, and predominantly French oak barrels. The Bodega also produces wine for private labels and contemporary reports put the winery's annual capacity in the region of 275,000–350,000 bottles.

Independent awards include a Bacchus gold medal for N'Amarat 2012 in 2021; a Bacchus gold for Sa Fita and silver for Lo Cortinel·lo in the following cycle; and Falstaff scores of 92 points for Fangar Elements 2013 and Son P 2017.

== Stud farm ==
A Hanoverian stud was established in 2007 and joined the breeders' association. Mid-2010s accounts put the herd at about 96–100 horses, most from the estate's own programme, under stud manager Patrick Kofler. Facilities have been described as including indoor and outdoor arenas and an 800-metre gallop. Es Fangar's Samba King, shown by Matthias Rath, won the Nürnberger Burgpokal.

The estate hosted the CDI4* Balearen Tour in June 2015 — the first international four-star invitational on the Balearic Islands — and a CDI5* in October 2016, then the only five-star dressage competition in Spain and one of twelve worldwide. Riders included Isabell Werth, who won the 2016 Grand Prix freestyle on El Santo with 78.875 per cent, Helen Langehanenberg and Beatriz Ferrer-Salat. The 2015 show drew about 6,000 spectators. Planned editions in 2017 and 2018 were cancelled because of clashes with other FEI dates.

== Sale ==
In March 2020 the estate including the winery was offered for more than 100 million USD. In December 2025 it was listed again at 87 million EUR through John Taylor. Luxury-press coverage cited by Balearic newspapers described the asking price as the highest then advertised for a Mallorcan property.

== See also ==
- Possessió
- Pla i Llevant (DO)
- Manacor
