= Padirac =

- Commune
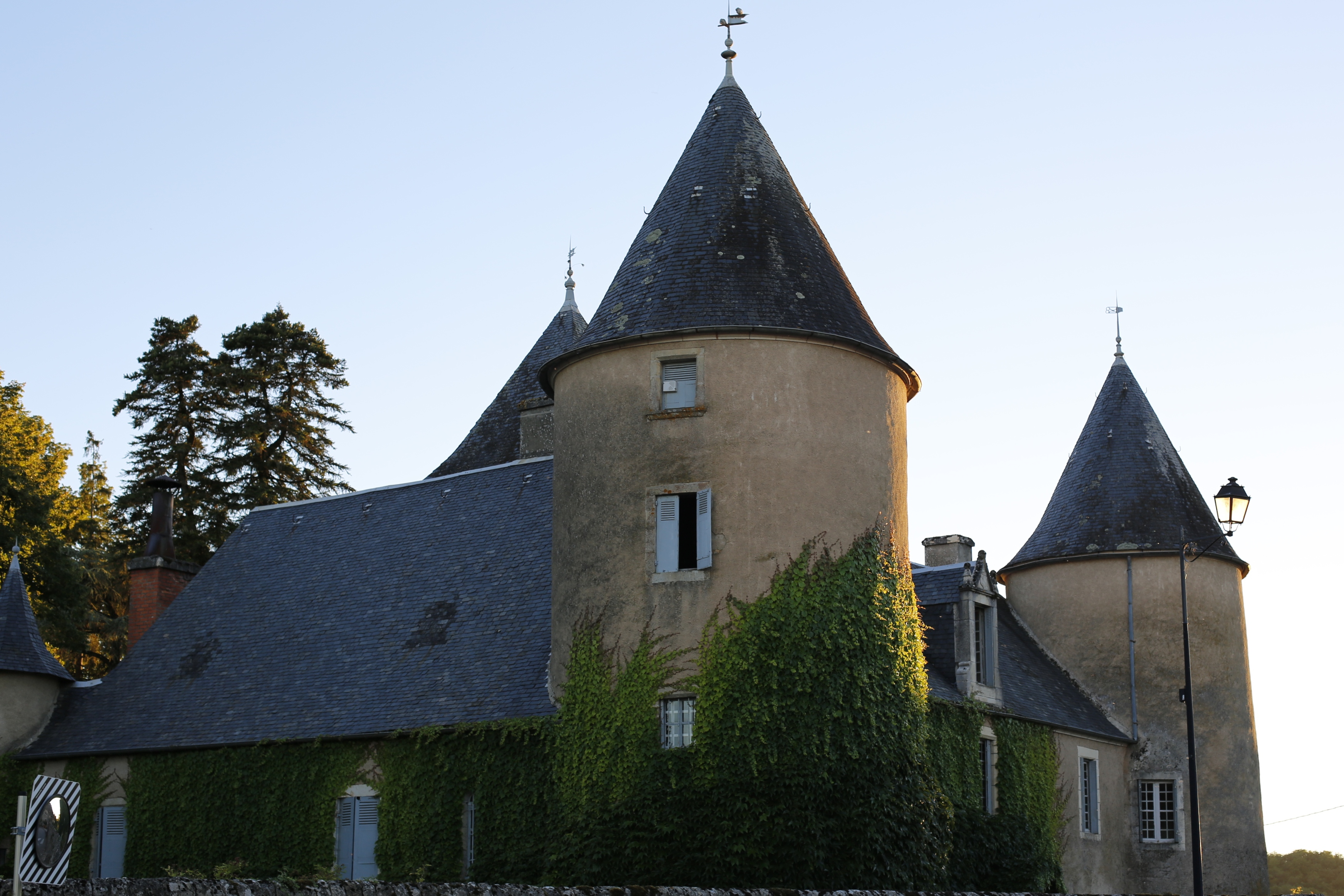
- The chateau
- Location of Padirac
- Location within France Location within Occitanie
- Coordinates: 44°50′33″N 1°45′15″E
- Country: France
- Region: Occitania
- Department: Lot
- Arrondissement: Gourdon
- Canton: Gramat
- Intercommunality: Causses et Vallée de la Dordogne

Government
  - Mayor (2020–2026): André Andrzejewski
- Area^{1}: 8.86 km^{2} (3.42 sq mi)
- Elevation: 340 m (1,120 ft)
- Highest elevation: 426 m (1,398 ft)
- Lowest elevation: 318 m (1,043 ft)
- Population (2023): 182
  - Density: 20.5/km^{2} (53.2/sq mi)
- Time zone: UTC+01:00 (CET)
  - Summer (DST): UTC+02:00 (CEST)
- INSEE/Postal code: 46213 /46500
- ^{1} French Land Register data, which excludes lakes, ponds, glaciers > 1 km^{2} (0.386 sq mi or 247 acres) and river estuaries.

Padirac (French pronunciation: [padiʁak]) is a commune in the Lot department in south-western France.

== Population ==
Historical population
Year	Pop.	±% p.a.
1968	177	—
1975	162	−1.26%
1982	148	−1.28%
1990	160	+0.98%
1999	168	+0.54%
2007	188	+1.42%
2012	184	−0.43%
2017	158	−3.00%
2023	182	+2.38%
Source: INSEE

== Notable people ==
- Armand Bouat (1873—1929), politician and merchant

== See also ==
- Padirac Cave
- Communes of the Lot department
