= Cala Agulla =

Beach in Mallorca, Spain

Coordinates: 39°43′21″N 3°27′09″E

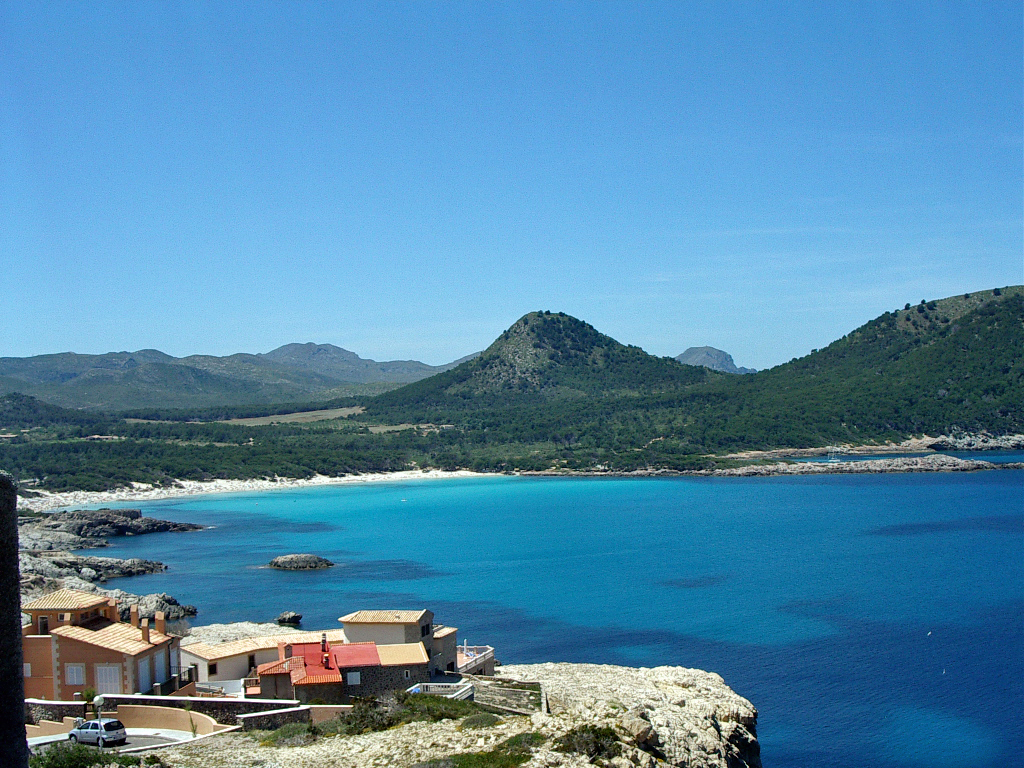

Cala Agulla is a beach in Mallorca, Spain.

It was declared a Àrea natural d'especial interès in 1991 by the Parliament of the Balearic Islands.
