= Comptes rendus de l'Académie des Sciences =

Scientific journal

- Discipline: Multidisciplinary
- Language: English, French

Publication details
- History: 1835–present
- Publisher: French Academy of Sciences (France)

Standard abbreviations
- ISO 4: C. R. Acad. Sci.

Indexing
- ISSN: 0001-4036

Links
- Journal homepage; Open Access back catalogue: 1835–1965 (in French)

Comptes rendus de l'Académie des Sciences (French pronunciation: [kɔ̃t ʁɑ̃dy də lakademi de sjɑ̃s], Proceedings of the Academy of Sciences), or simply Comptes rendus, is a French scientific journal published since 1835. It is the proceedings of the French Academy of Sciences. It is currently split into seven sections, published on behalf of the Academy until 2020 by Elsevier: Mathématique, Mécanique, Physique, Géoscience, Palévol, Chimie, and Biologies. As of 2020, the Comptes Rendus journals are published by the Academy with a diamond open access model.

== Naming history ==
The journal has had several name changes and splits over the years.

=== 1835–1965 ===
Comptes rendus was initially established in 1835 as Comptes rendus hebdomadaires des séances de l'Académie des Sciences. It began as an alternative publication pathway for more prompt publication than the Mémoires de l'Académie des Sciences, which had been published since 1666. The Mémoires, which continued to be published alongside the Comptes rendus throughout the nineteenth century, had a publication cycle which resulted in memoirs being published years after they had been presented to the Academy. Some academicians continued to publish in the Mémoires because of the strict page limits in the Comptes rendus.

=== 1966–1980 ===
After 1965 this title was split into five sections:

- Série A (Sciences mathématiques) – mathematics
- Série B (Sciences physiques) – physics and geosciences
- Série C (Sciences chimiques) – chemistry
- Série D (Sciences naturelles) – life sciences
- Vie académique – academy notices and miscellanea (between 1968 and 1970, and again between 1979 and 1983)

Series A and B were published together in one volume except in 1974.

=== 1981–1993 ===
The areas were rearranged as follows:

- Série I (Sciences Mathématiques) – mathematics
- Série II (Mécanique-physique, Chimie, Sciences de l'univers, Sciences de la Terre) – physics, chemistry, astronomy and geosciences
- Série III (Sciences de la vie) – life sciences
- Vie académique – academy notices and miscellanea (the last 3 volumes of the second edition, between 1981 and 1983)
- Vie des sciences – A renamed Vie académique (from 1984 to 1996)

=== 1994–2001 ===
These publications remained the same:

- Série I (Sciences mathématiques) – mathematics
- Série III (Sciences de la Vie) – life sciences
- Vie des sciences – A renamed Vie académique (until 1996)

The areas published in Série II were slowly split into other publications in ways that caused some confusion.

In 1994, Série II, which covered physics, chemistry, astronomy and geosciences, was replaced by Série IIA and Série IIB. Série IIA was exclusive to geosciences, and Série IIB covered chemistry and astronomy and the now-distinct mechanics and physics.

In 1998, Série IIB covered mechanics, physics and astronomy; chemistry got its separate publication, Série IIC.

In 2000, Série IIB became dedicated exclusively to mechanics in May. Astronomy got redefined as astrophysics, which along with physics was covered by the new Série IV. Série IV began publishing in March; however, Séries IIB published two more issues on physics and astrophysics in April and May before starting the new run.

=== 2002 onwards ===
The present naming and subject assignment was established in 2002:

- Comptes Rendus Biologies – life sciences except paleontology and evolutionary biology. Continues in part Série IIC (biochemistry) and III.
- Comptes Rendus Chimie – chemistry. Continues in part Série IIC.
- Comptes Rendus Géoscience – geosciences. Continues in part Série IIA.
- Comptes Rendus Mathématique – mathematics. Continues Série I.
- Comptes Rendus Mécanique – mechanics. Continues Série IIB.
- Comptes Rendus Palévol – paleontology and evolutionary biology. Continues in part Série IIA and III.
- Comptes Rendus Physique – topical issues in physics (mainly optics, astrophysics and particle physics). Continues Série IV.

== Online open archives ==
The Comptes rendus de l'Académie des Sciences publications are available through the National Library of France as part of its free online library and archive of other historical documents and works of art, Gallica. The publications available online are:

- Comptes rendus hebdomadaires des séances de l'Académie des science (1835–1965)
- Séries A et B, Sciences Mathématiques et Sciences Physiques (1966–1973)
- Série A, Sciences Mathématiques, (1974)
- Série B, Sciences Physiques, (1974)
- Séries A et B, Sciences Mathématiques et Sciences Physiques (1975–1980)
  - Besides the material for this timeframe, this collection also has a separate set of scans of all the material of Série I - Mathématique from 1981 to 1990
- Série C, Sciences Chimique
- Série D, Sciences Naturelle
- Vie Académique (1968–1970)
- Vie Académique (1979–1983)
- Série I - Mathématique
- Séries A et B, Sciences Mathématiques et Sciences Physiques (1975–1980) has a different set of scans for all of this material.
- Série II - Mécanique-physique, Chimie, Sciences de l'univers, Sciences de la Terr
- The link to Série I - Mathématique (1984–1996) includes a different set of scans for the first 3 issues of 1981 of this series.
- Série III - Sciences de la vie
- Série I - Mathématique
  - Séries A et B, Sciences Mathématiques et Sciences Physiques (1975–1980) has a different set of scans for this series' material until 1990.
  - This collection contains a different set of scans of the 1981 material of Série II - Mécanique-physique, Chimie, Sciences de l'univers, Sciences de la Terr (1981–1983).
- Série II - Mécanique-physique, Chimie, Sciences de l'univers, Sciences de la Terre (1984–1994)
  - The first year of material (1994) of material of Série IIb - Mécanique, physique, chimie, astronomie (1995–1996) is misfiled in this collection.
- Série IIa - Sciences de la terre et des planètes (1994–1996)
- Série IIb - Mécanique, physique, chimie, astronomie (1995–1996)
  - The first year of material (1994) is misfiled together with Série II - Mécanique-physique, Chimie, Sciences de l'univers, Sciences de la Terre (1994–1996).
- Série III - Sciences de la vie
- Vie des sciences

All publications from 1997 to 2019 were published commercially by Elsevier. From 2020 on, the Comptes Rendus Palevol have been published by the Muséum National d'Histoire Naturelle (Paris) for the Académie des Sciences. All other series of the Comptes Rendus of the Acamémie des Sciences have been published (from 2020 on) by Mersenne under a Diamond Open Access model.
