= Cuevas del Drach =

Four caves on the island of Majorca, Spain

Coordinates: 39.5359°N 3.3304°E

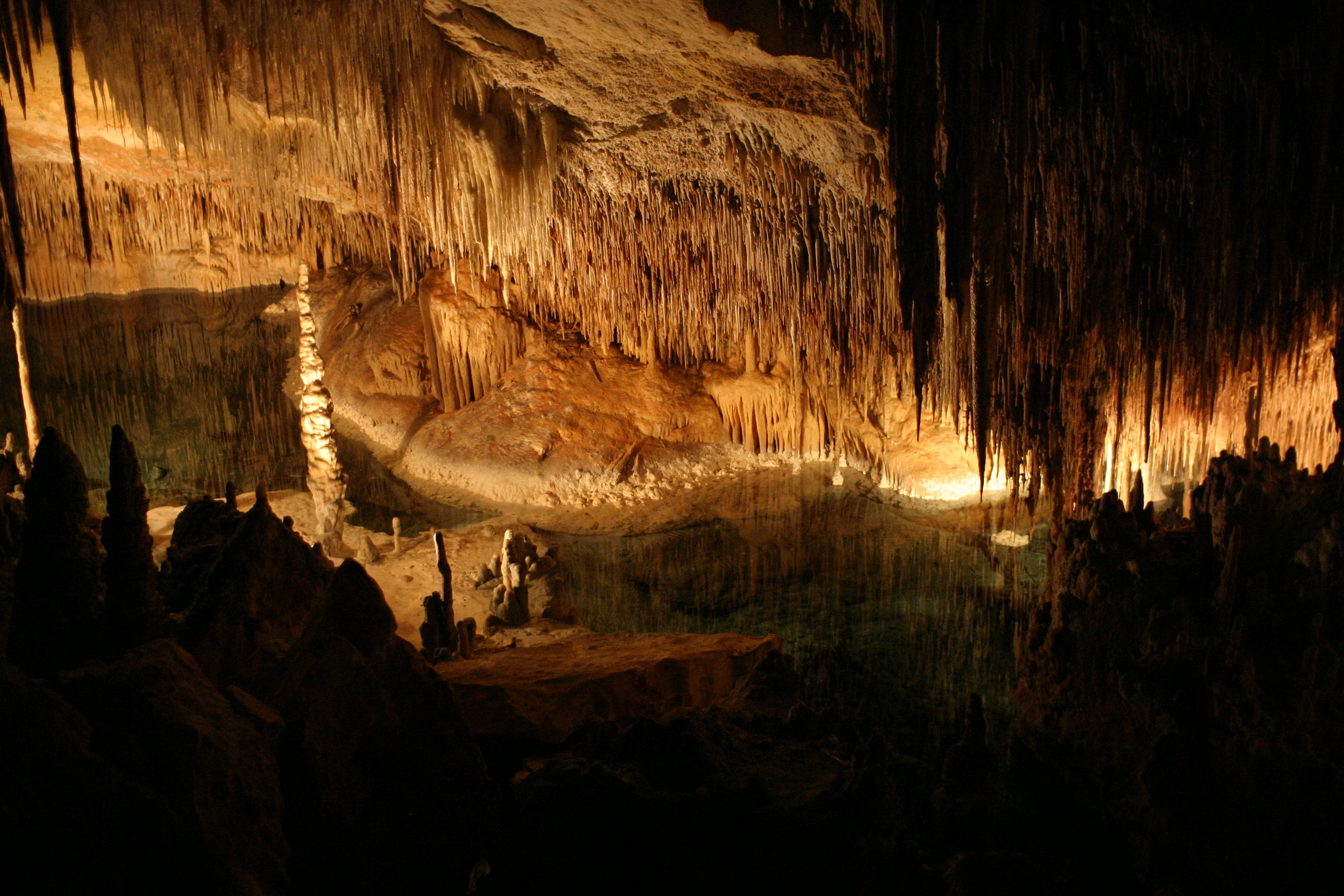
Cuevas del Drach

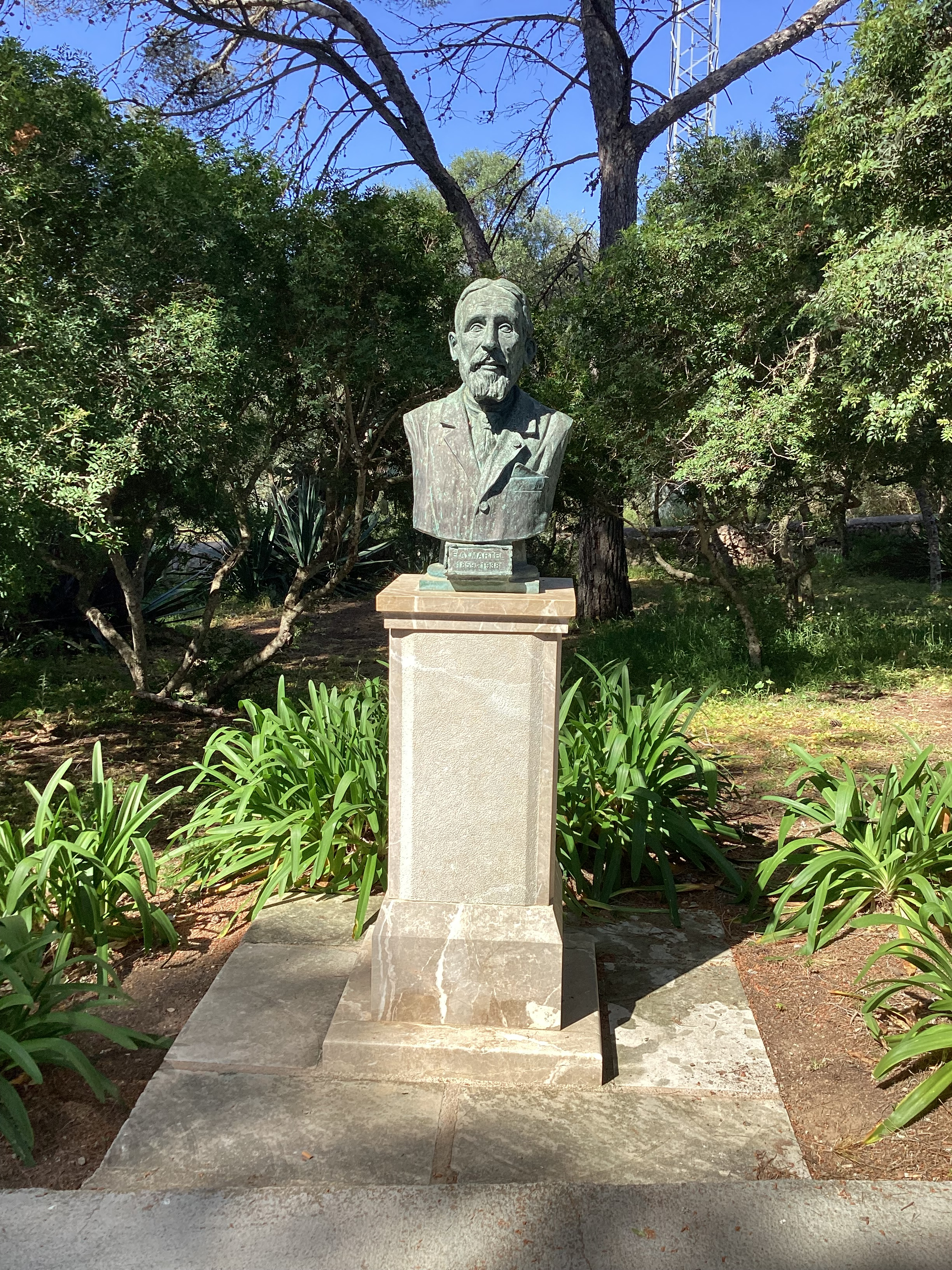
Martel -Pioneer of cave exploration

The Caves of Drach (modern Catalan spelling: Coves del Drac [ˈkɔβəz ðəl ˈdɾak]; Spanish: Cuevas del Drach; lit. 'Dragon caves') are four great caves that are located in the island of Majorca, Balearic Islands, Spain, extending to a depth of 25 m and reaching approximately 2.4 km in length. They are in the municipality of Manacor, near the locality of Porto Cristo. They were first mentioned in a letter dated 1338. The four caves, called Black Cave, White Cave, Cave of Luis Salvador, and Cave of the French, are connected to each other.

The caves have formed by water being forced through the entrance from the Mediterranean Sea, and some researchers think the formation may date back to the Miocene Epoch. There is an underground lake situated within the caves called Martel Lake, which is about 115 m in length and 30 m in width, and its depth varies between four and twelve meters. It is named after the French explorer and scientist Édouard-Alfred Martel, considered the founding father of speleology, who was invited to explore the cave in 1896. While German cave explorer, M.F. Will, had mapped the White and Black cave in 1880, Martel found two more caves, as well as the underground lake.

A boatride on the Llac Martel, the lake inside the cave. This was the end of a guided tour in February 2024.

The caves are open to the public for a fee, and are one of the main tourist attractions on Mallorca. The visit typically ends with a classical music concert, performed by a small orchestra of musicians on a fleet of small row boats.

The caves are such an integral part of the tourism industry, that its closure, even if temporary, is seen by the locals as a bad sign for the economy.

== See also ==
- Caving in the Balearic Islands
