= S'Albufera de Mallorca =

Nature preserve in Mallorca, Spain

Coordinates: 39°47′N 3°6′E

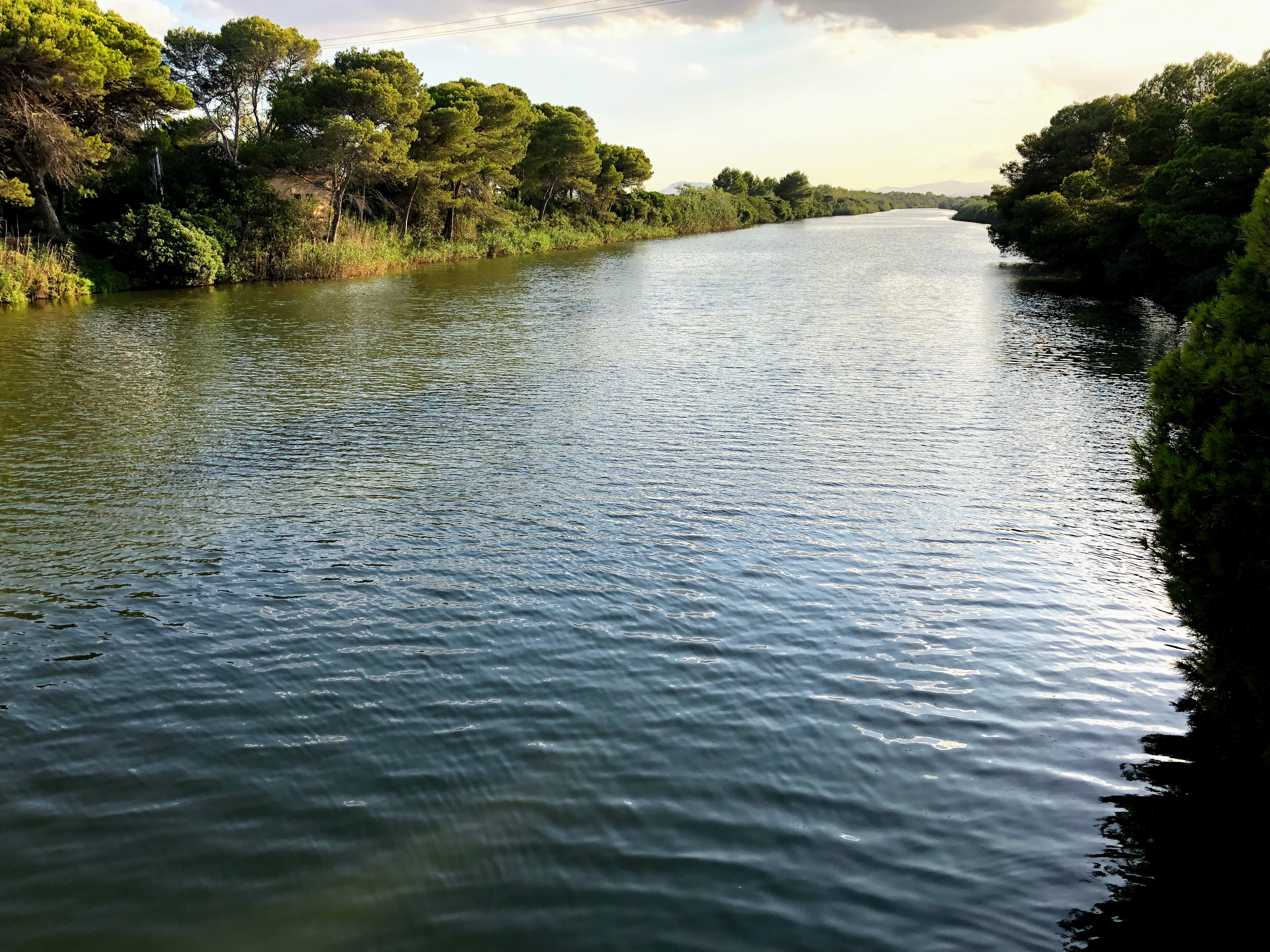
Main channel Torrent de San Miguel

S'Albufera de Mallorca is a nature preserve on the Balearic island of Mallorca.

The preserve contains the largest and most important wetland of the Balearic islands. The wetland was formed out of an ancient lagoon, separated from the sea by a series of dunes, which most of all due to human influence has been filled by sediments by now. The natural preserve comprises now 1708 hectares.

== Gallery ==
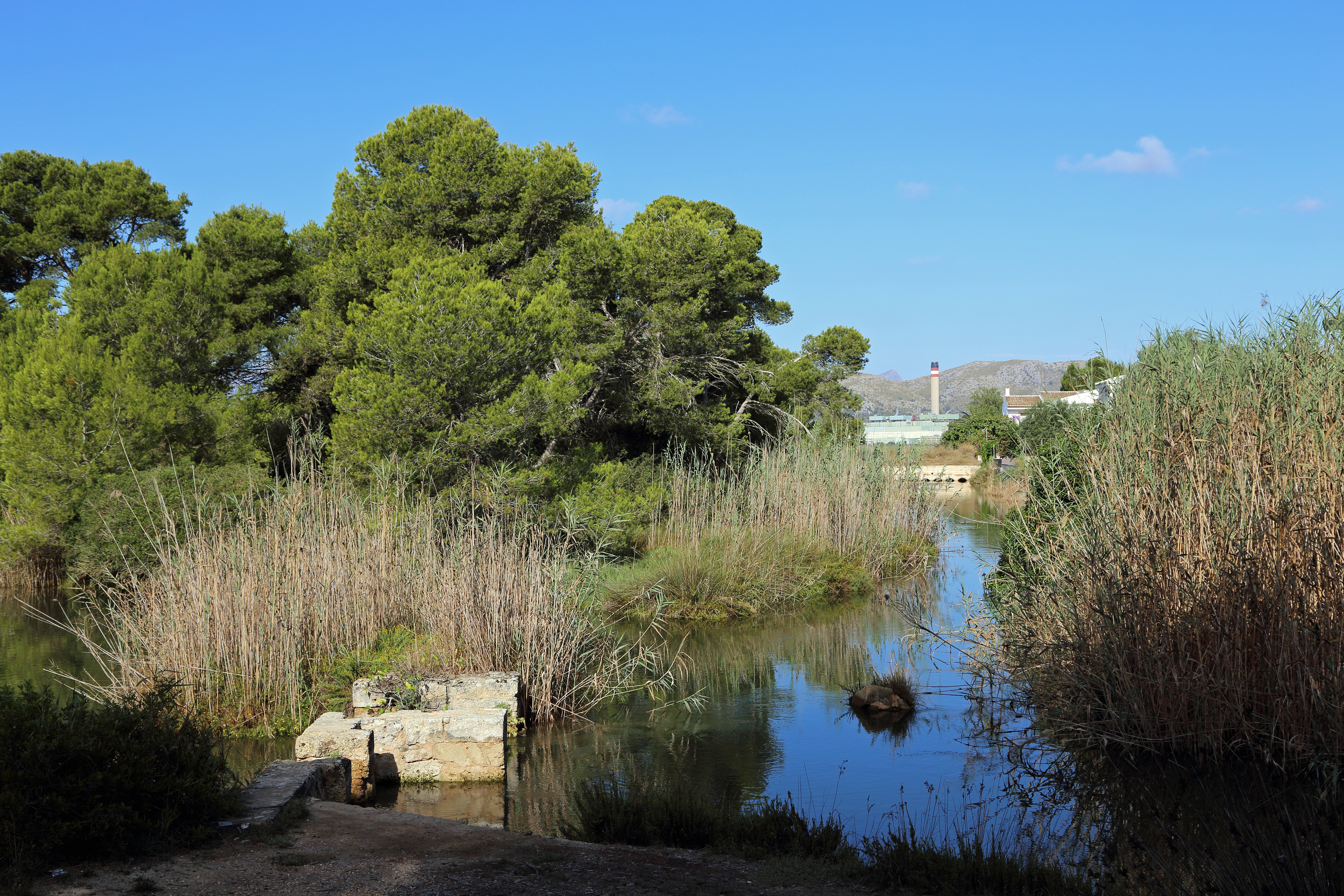
S'Albufera close to Platja de Muro

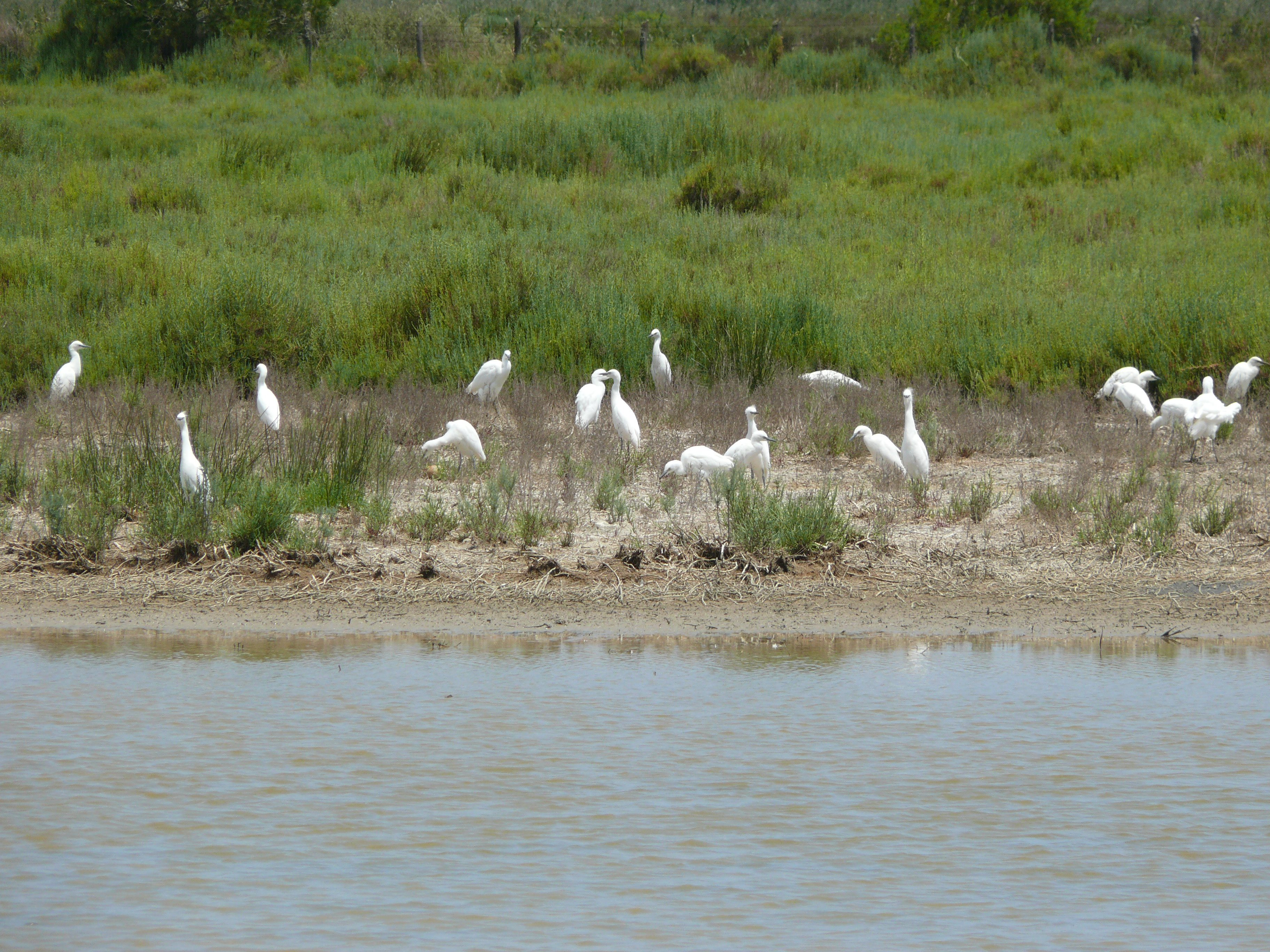
Egretta garzetta
