= Manacor =

- Municipality
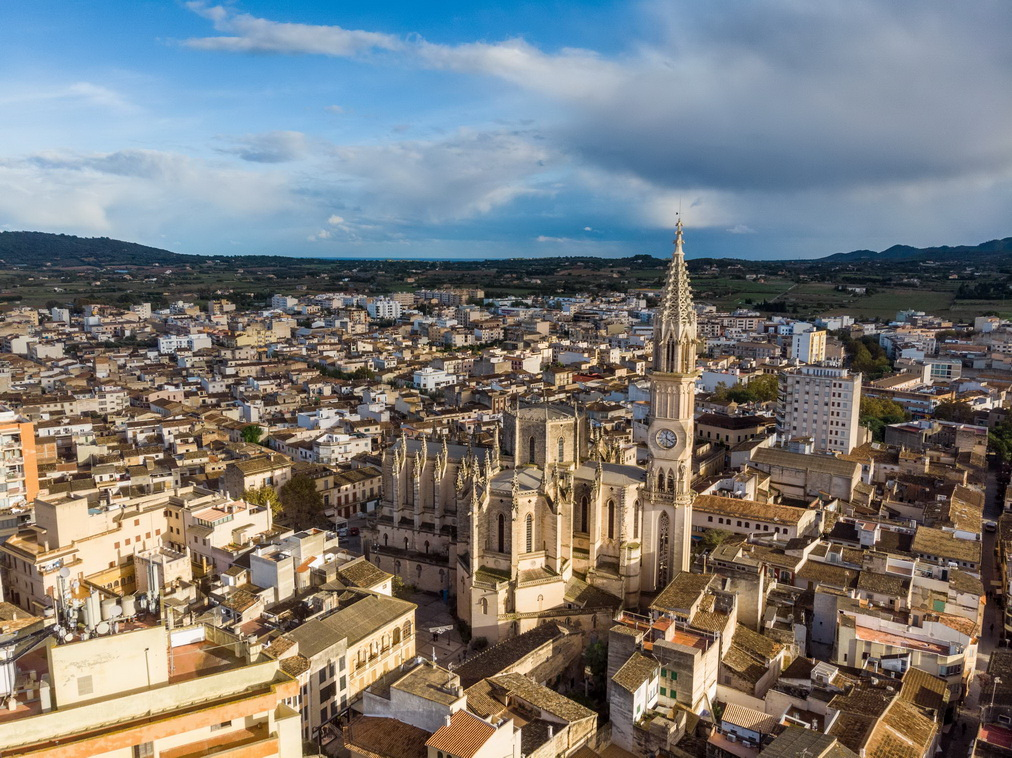

- Flag Coat of arms

- Location in Majorca Manacor (Balearic Islands) Manacor (Spain)
- Coordinates: 39°34′0″N 3°12′0″E
- Country: Spain
- Autonomous community: Balearic Islands
- Province: Balearic Islands
- Comarca: Llevant
- Judicial district: Manacor

Government
  - Mayor: Miquel Oliver Gomila (2019) (Més per Mallorca)

Area
  - Total: 260.31 km^{2} (100.51 sq mi)
- Elevation: 80 m (260 ft)

Population (2025-01-01)
  - Total: 49,153
  - Density: 188.82/km^{2} (489.05/sq mi)
- Demonym: Manacorí
- Time zone: UTC+1 (CET)
  - Summer (DST): UTC+2 (CEST)
- Postal code: 07500
- Website: Official website

Manacor (Balearic Catalan: [mənəˈkɔ]) is a town and municipality on the island of Mallorca, part of the Spanish autonomous community of the Balearic Islands. It is the second-largest town in Mallorca, after the capital of Palma. The municipality features tourist attractions such as Porto Cristo, site of the famous Caves of Drach, and Cales de Mallorca. Manacor has one of the busiest street markets on the island, held every Monday morning. Manacor is famous for high-quality wood furniture manufacturing and artificial pearls.

== History ==
The first indications of human occupation in the area of Manacor go back to 2000-1200 BC. Of this period are the artificial coves as burial places (cova de s'Homonet at Son Ribot, Mitjà de ses Beies at Sa Sínia Nova, etc.), and a type of construction similar to the naveta, either isolated or grouped in villages, which were used as living spaces (sa Marineta, s'Hospitalet Vell, etc.).

Of the megalithic Talaiot culture, the most outstanding constructions are s'Hospitalet Vell, es Boc, Bellver, as well as the constructions of Bendrís, Son Sureda and Sa Gruta.

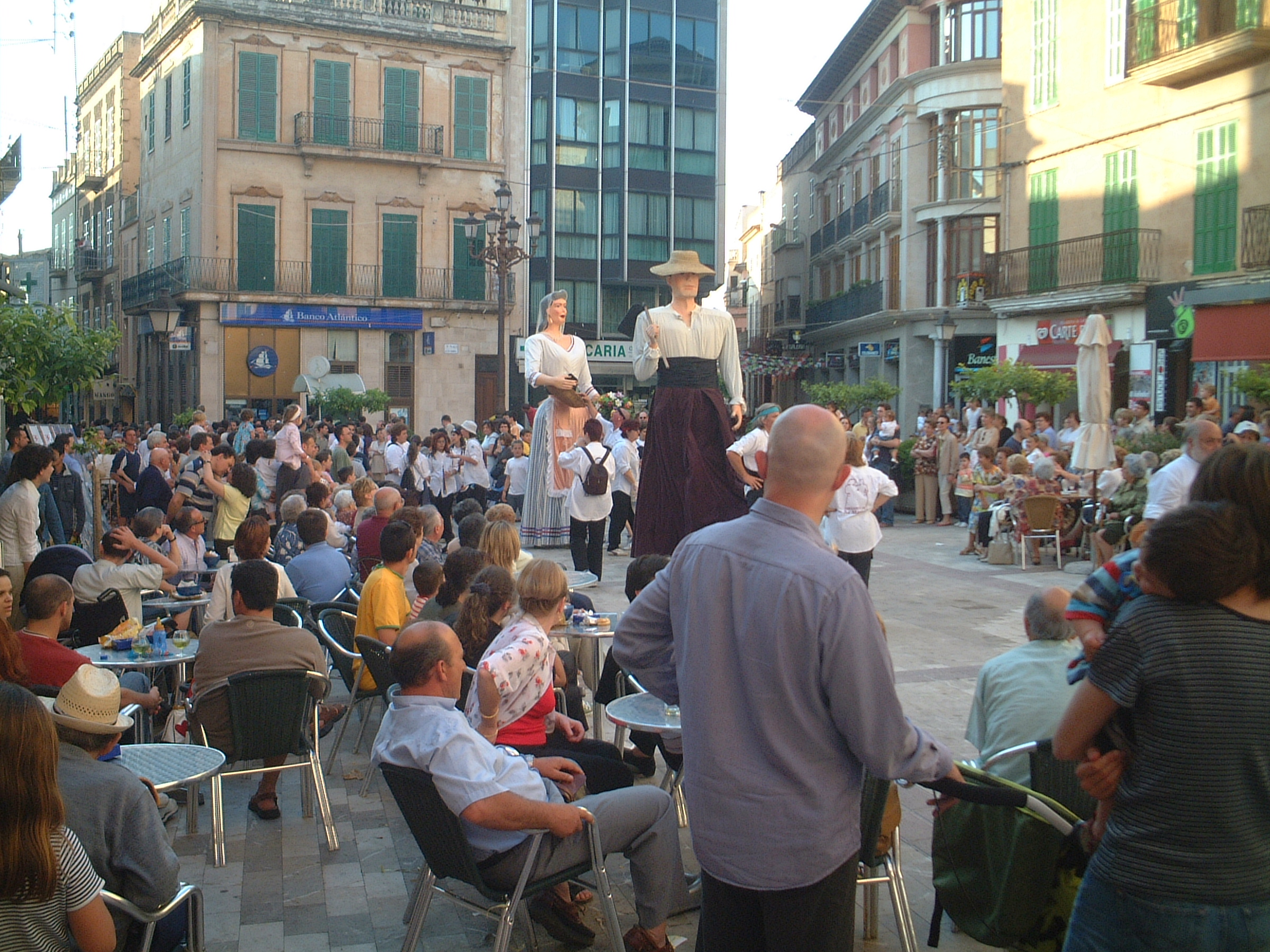

The origin of the town of Manacor goes back to the times before the Islamic dominance. In Porto Cristo, the submarine discoveries of objects show that it was a Roman port. The remains of the basilicas of sa Carrotja and son Peretó prove the existence of well-established Christian communities.

After the invasion launched by James I of Aragon, Nuño Sánchez received from him the land of Manacor. In 1300, James II granted Manacor a statute of municipality. The Torre del Palau and the fortification of some rural houses like the Torre de ses Puntes and the Torre dels Enagistes have been preserved from the beginnings of town planning at Manacor.

Although the etymology of the word Manacor seems to be Amazighe, the coat of arms (hand holding a heart) is originated by the phonetic approximation in the Catalan language, like other coats of arms around the island.

A native of Manacor, Simó Tort, was a character in medieval social conflicts.

Saint Vincent Ferrer came to Manacor in 1414. In 1576 the convent dedicated to the saint was founded, and after this the construction of the baroque church began. At the beginning of the following century the construction of the cloister began.

In 1879 the railroad line from Inca to Manacor was opened. About 1890 the construction of the new parish church Nostra Senyora dels Dolors began, located on the same place as the former churches. The most ancient of them had been documented in 1232 and had possibly been built upon an Arab mosque. The bell tower of the present church, an emblem of the town, measures 75 metres. In 1897 the first factory of artificial pearls, the famous Majorica, was founded. So Manacor became the business and industrial centre of Llevant. In 1912 Manacor received the title of town.

In 1936, during the Spanish Civil War, there was an attempted landing of republican forces in the shores of Porto Cristo that was repelled by the fascist forces. The mayor of Manacor, Antoni Amer Llodrà "Garanya", was assassinated by the fascists.

== Geography ==
The relief is not very pronounced. It takes in three areas: the flat region of the Pla, where the town of Manacor stands; the Serra de Llevant, characterised by its soft relief; and the Marina, which is formed by white gritty stone and inclines down to the sea. These limestone karsts have favoured the appearance of caves. The most outstanding for their beauty are the Dragon Caves and the Fishhook Caves. Near the coast, there is one of the longest underwater caves known in Europe : the Gleda-Camp des Pou system. It has more than 13 km in length.

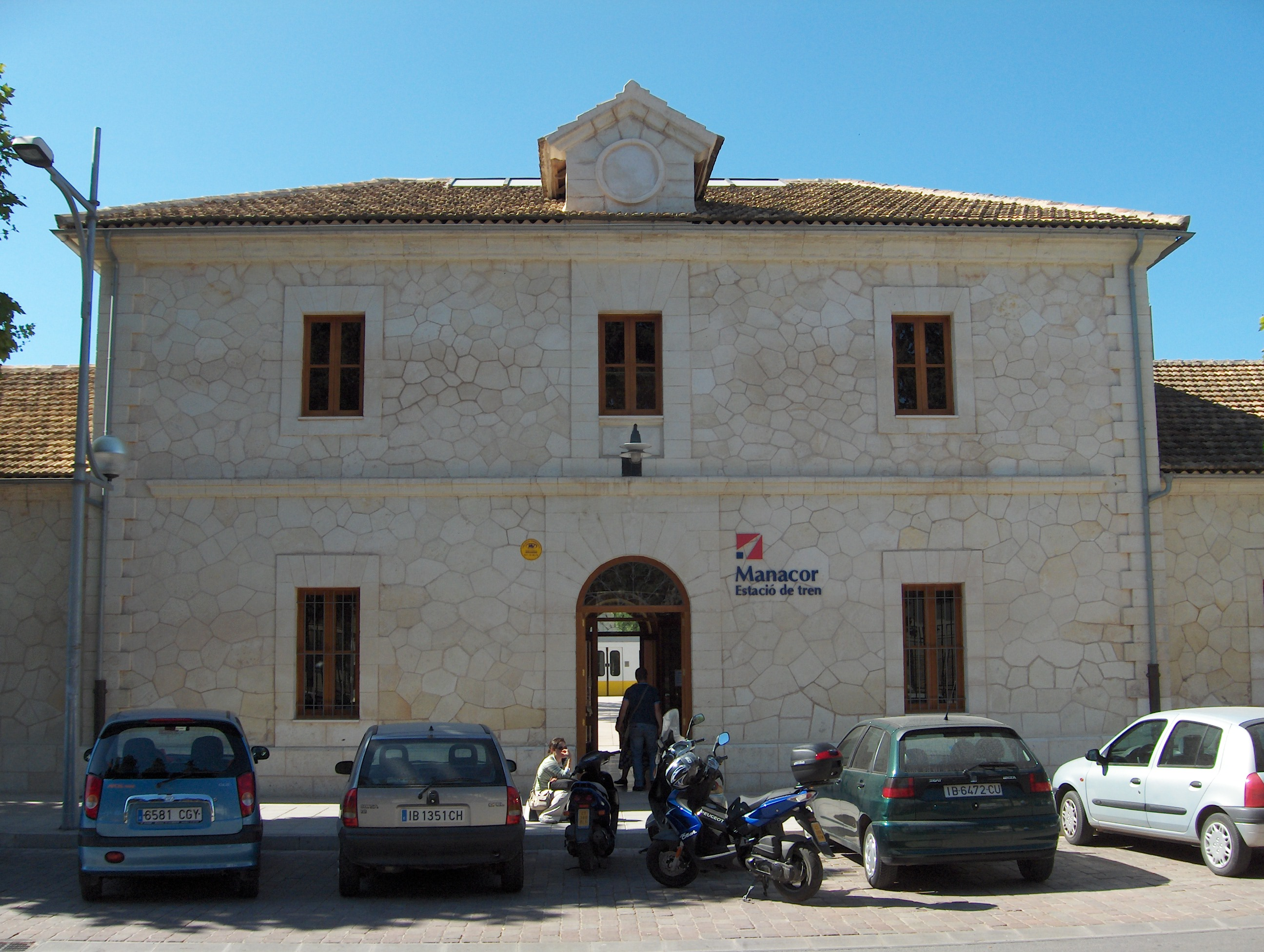
Railway station

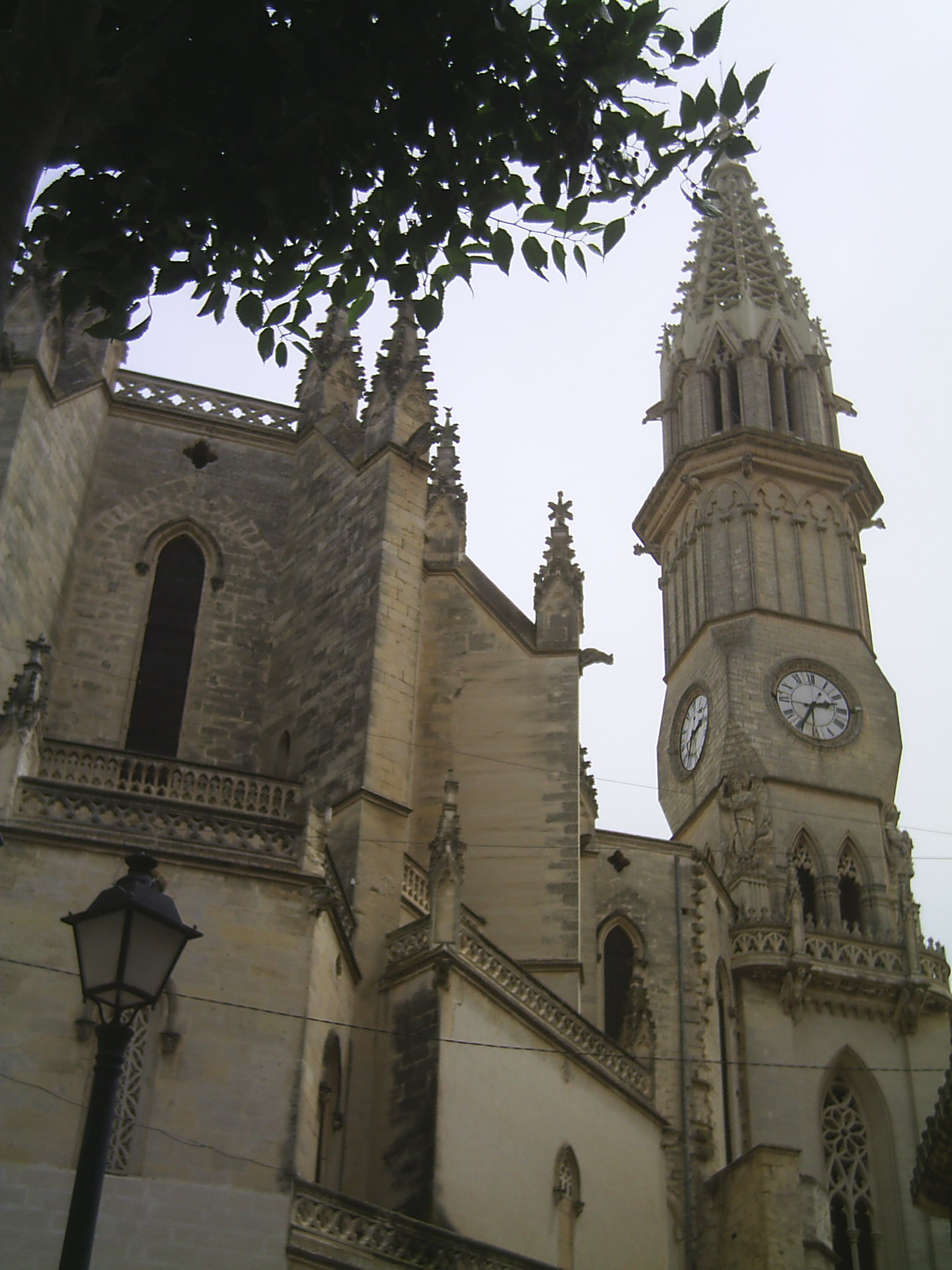
Bell tower of the church Nostra Senyora dels Dolors

A wide range of coves embellish the coast of Manacor: S'illot, Cala Morlanda, Cala Petita, Porto Cristo, Cala Anguila, Cala Mendia, s'Estany d'en Mas, Cala Falcó, Cala Varques, Cala Sequer, Cala Magraner, Cala Pilota, Cala Virgili, Cala Bota, Cala Antena, Cala Domingos and Cala Murada.

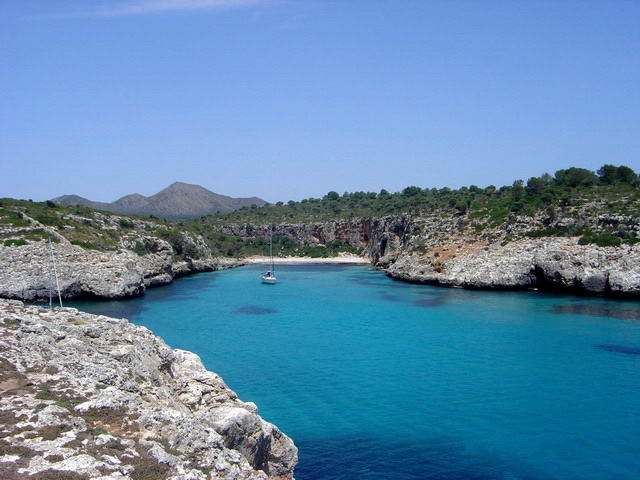
Cala Magraner

The climate is Mediterranean, with typically mild winters and hot summers. During the months of July and August, the weather is hot and sunny, boasting around 11 hours of sun daily. During the winter, the weather can get chilly, but mild. The average annual temperature is between 16 and 17 °C.

The forest area represents little more than 35% of the whole area. Pine forest is found in the mountainous areas but there are hardly any survivals of the indigenous holm-oak woodlands.

The cultivated land represents 68% of the area. The agricultural landscape is characterized by almond trees, cereals, fig trees, carob trees and vineyard. The cultivation of vegetables is focused on melon, pepper and lettuce.

The town of Manacor is crossed by the Sa Cabana stream. This stream flows into the Na Borges stream. The most important of Manacor

== Demographics ==
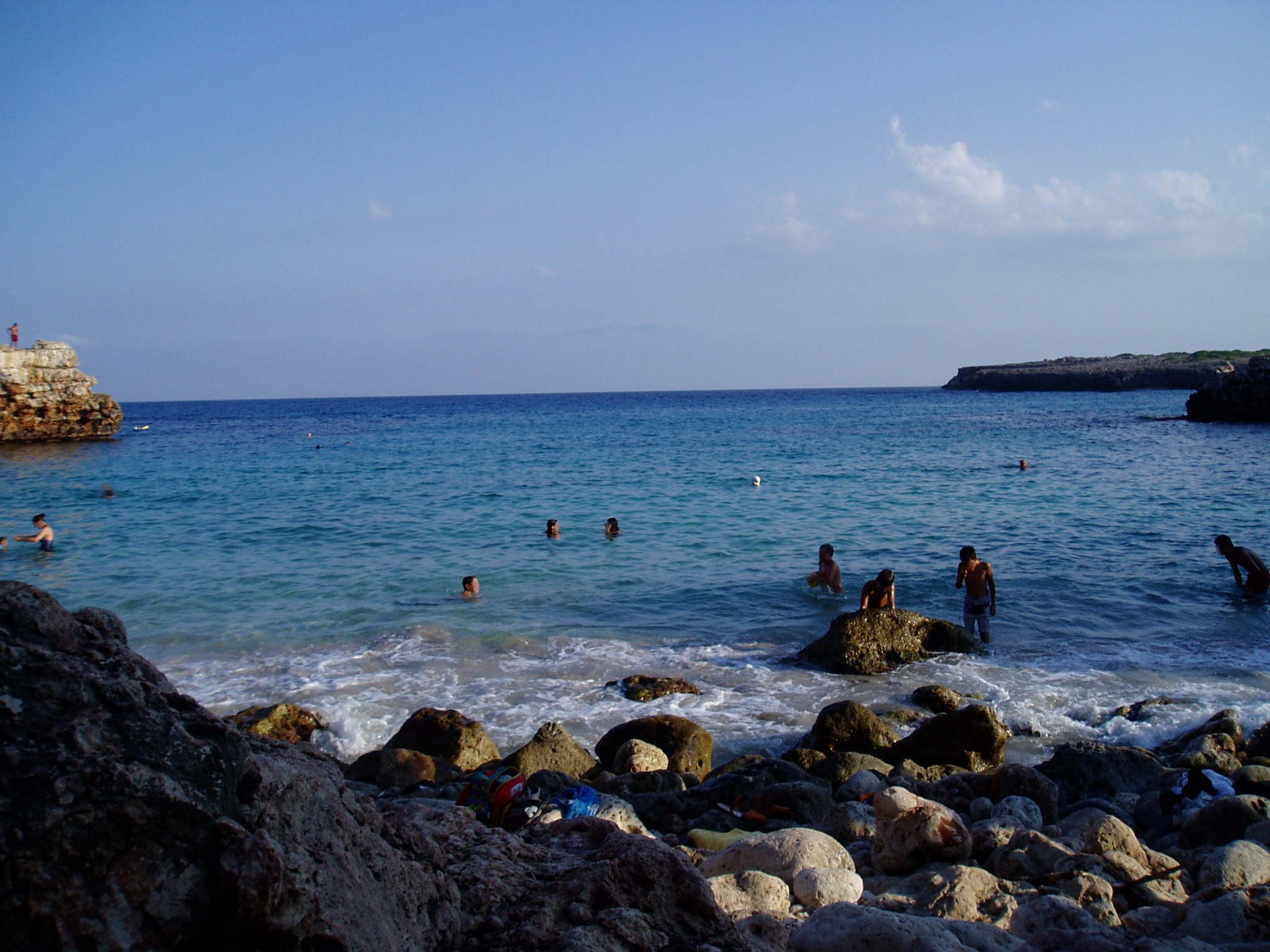
Cala Morlanda

Municipality	Population
16th century	5,000 approx.
18th century	7,000 approx.
Beginning of 20th century	13,000 approx.

Centers	Population 2005
Manacor	25,324
Porto Cristo	6,385
S'Illot-Cala Morlanda	1,576
Son Macià	839
Cales de Mallorca	725
Cala Murada	624
Cala Anguila-Cala Mendia	296
S'Estany den Mas	139
Total	35,908

== Economy ==
Until the 19th century the economy of Manacor was based on agriculture (cereals and vineyard) and livestock (sheep), although the textile and food sectors as well as pottery were important too. Although there are no longer the large estates that there were at that time, there are some that maintain their antique splendor, such as Santa Cirga and Es Fangar (the largest).

The 19th century marked the beginning of the transformation of the town. The industrial activities dedicated to the processing of agricultural product increased; windmills and a liquor distillery appeared. From the second half of the century on the production of furniture became one of the basic industries of Manacor. Pottery and the production of liquors and wines also continued.

The factory of artificial pearls was very important during the 20th century.

From the 1960s, tourism was added to the development of the economic activity of the municipality.

Construction is an important sector, as well as commerce.

== Culture ==
=== Sant Antoni ===
The most popular celebration in Manacor. The ceremony begins with the exit of a group of disguised men of Saint Anthony, the greater Demon and several smaller demons, on the eve of the 17 of January. They cross the streets performing a dance that represents the temptations to which the saint was submitted. At night bonfires are ignited. The group visit the several bonfires of the municipality. People sing and dance, and eat "llangonisses" and "botifarrons" (typical pork products of the island).

On the following day are celebrated the "Beneïdes", a parade of floats and animals of all types. They are blessed because the saint is the patron of the animals.

=== Fairs ===
The most important fairs are the Fires i Festes de Primavera. They are celebrated from the end of May to the beginning of June. During these days, there are many activities and exhibitions. The celebrations close with a parade of floats.

Other fairs : Fair of Saint James, patron of Manacor, the 25 July, and the September Fair.

=== Theatre ===
Manacor has an important theatre season, the Fira de Teatre de Manacor, usually in September/October.

=== Moratons ===
This is a ritual dance of uncertain origin. It seems that it was composed around the year 1855 for religious reasons, but it is possible that its origin goes back to 16th century. The clothes of the Moretons looked like those of Barbary pirates. When they dance, they hit wood pieces located in the hands, knees and abdomen.

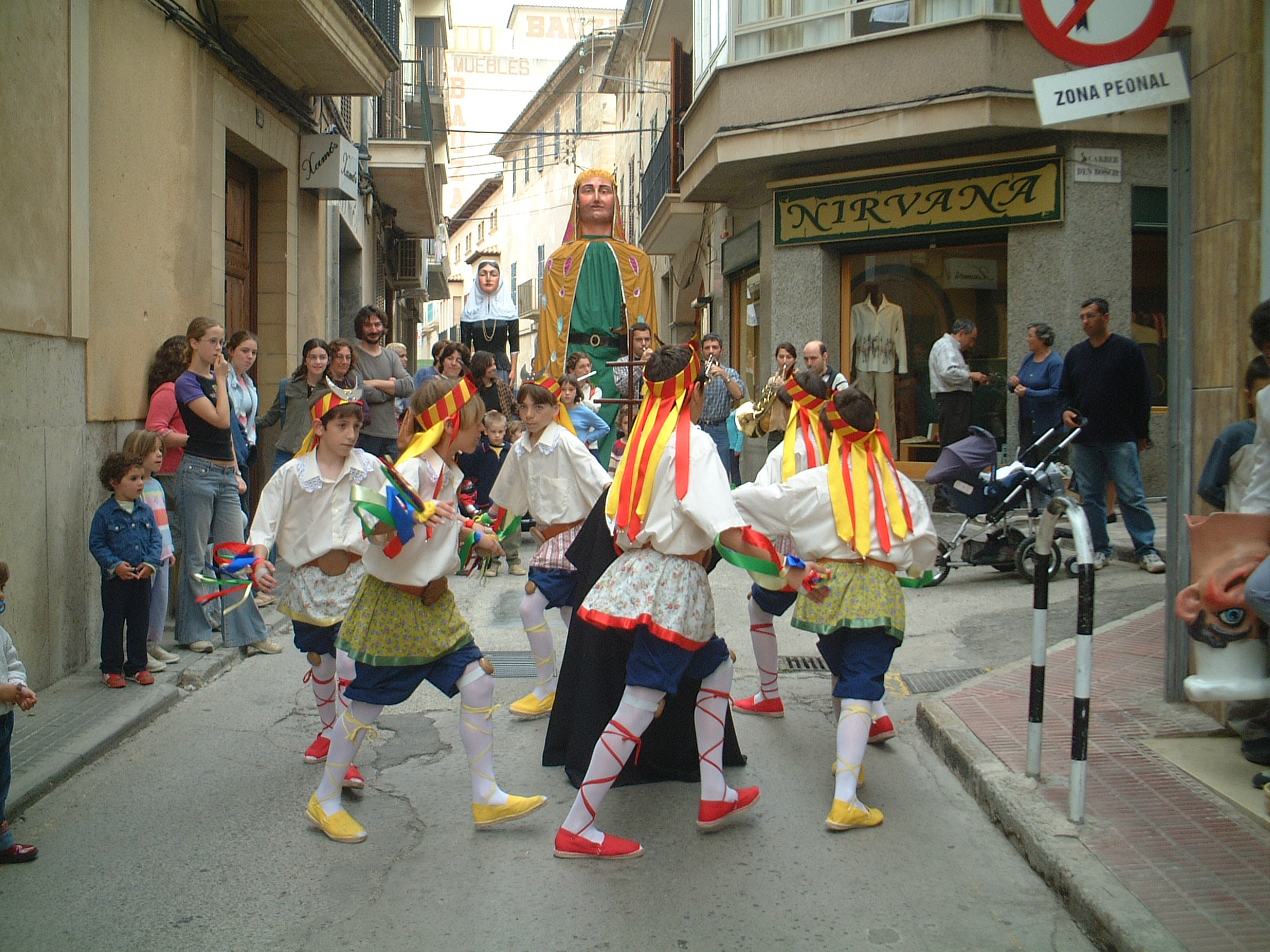
Moratons

Els Moretons go out in May, by the Sant Domingo celebrations.

=== Cossiers ===
There are documents about this ritual dance from 18th century. The cossiers are a group of men who dance around a woman known as "The Lady". They wear hats and coloured clothes.

Nowadays, they open the Fires i Festes de Primavera.

=== Vimer ===
This has been a legend for more than 100 years. The vimer (Salix viminalis) is a willow located in S'Hort des Correu, a country house in the outskirts of the town of Manacor. The legend says that the tree can heal children with hernia. For this, they are passed through the branches of the tree, when the sun rises on the Saint John's Day, the 24th of June.

Industry

An industry for which Manacor is famous, and indeed Mallorca in general, is olive wood. There are factories in Manacor that allow visits. Manacor is also known for its artificial pearl factories.

=== Gastronomy ===
Typical products are Suspiros de Manacor, also known as Sospiros, sweet dry cookies often eaten with coffee or tea, and the Pastís de Pobre (Poorman Cake).

=== Sports ===
In addition to the main sports - football, basketball and volleyball - Manacor has horse racing fans and there are chariot races at the hippodrome. Manacor is also the birthplace and home town of former Spanish football international player Albert Riera and tennis legend Rafael Nadal.

== Natives of Manacor ==
- Antoni Maria Alcover
- Toni Nadal
- Miguel Ángel Nadal
- Joan Binimelis
- Elena Gómez
- Sergi Guardiola
- Luis Ladaria
- Rafael Nadal
- Maria Antònia Oliver Cabrer
- Arnau Riera
- Albert Riera
- Edu Robinson
