= Porto Cristo =

Spanish small town

Coordinates: 39°33′N 3°20′E

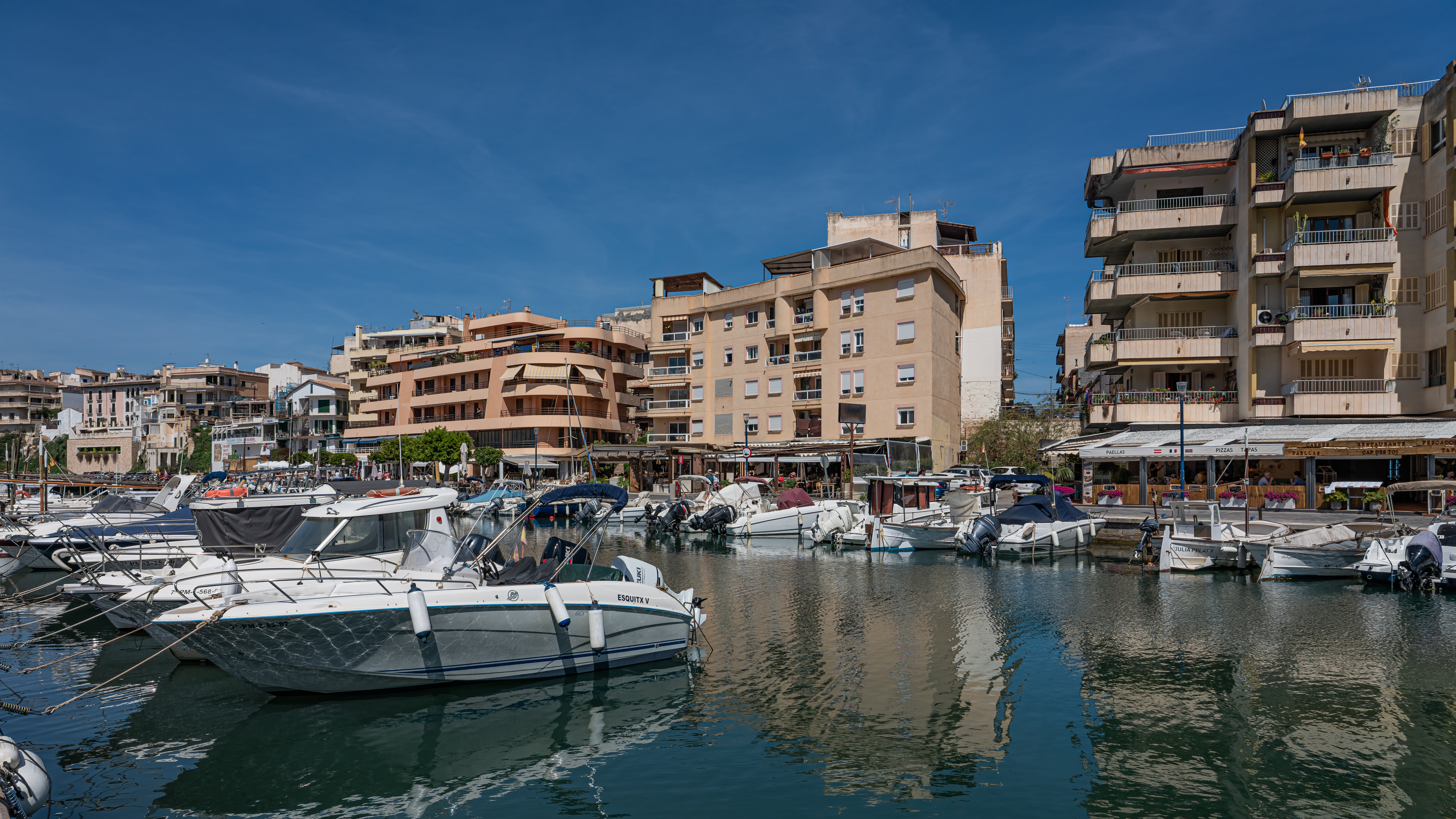
Marina of Porto Cristo

Porto Cristo is a small town on the eastern coast of Mallorca, Spain. It is 14 km (9 mi) from the town of Manacor and is within the Manacor municipality.

== Geography ==
The village is located in a major tourist area between Costa de los Pinos and Cala Murada. Its small bay opens to the southeast and seems almost closed on the right by a large rock called Es Morro de Sa Carabassa. At its end, a lighthouse built in 1851 rises. The slope called Punta d'Es Pelats partially closes the pier of Porto Cristo and a stretch of sea rises a quarter-mile (0.4 km) west juts and twists later, at a right angle, in a northward direction, extending some 300 metres (330 yd) more. This hardly navigable area constitutes the last primitive vestige of the port, which has been gradually blinded by the alluvial lands, now converted into fords and small orchards, at the end of the depression, which reaches about two kilometers (1.25 miles). The height of the Caves of the Hams was the pier during the Roman domination.

Four roads connect Porto Cristo with other towns. From north to south they are:

- Ma-4023 towards Son Servera, 9 km (5.6 mi)
- Ma-4024 towards Son Carrió, 6 km (3.7 mi)
- Ma-4020 towards Manacor, 12 km (7.5 mi)
- Ma-4014 towards Porto Colom, 18 km (11.2 mi)

== Tourism ==
Porto Cristo remains a modern but unspoilt all year round location. Though in no way a primary tourist destination in Mallorca, Porto Cristo promotes itself as a quiet resort and tries to encourage foreign visitors. The main tourist attractions are two sets of caves, the larger Coves del Drach and the Coves dels Hams.

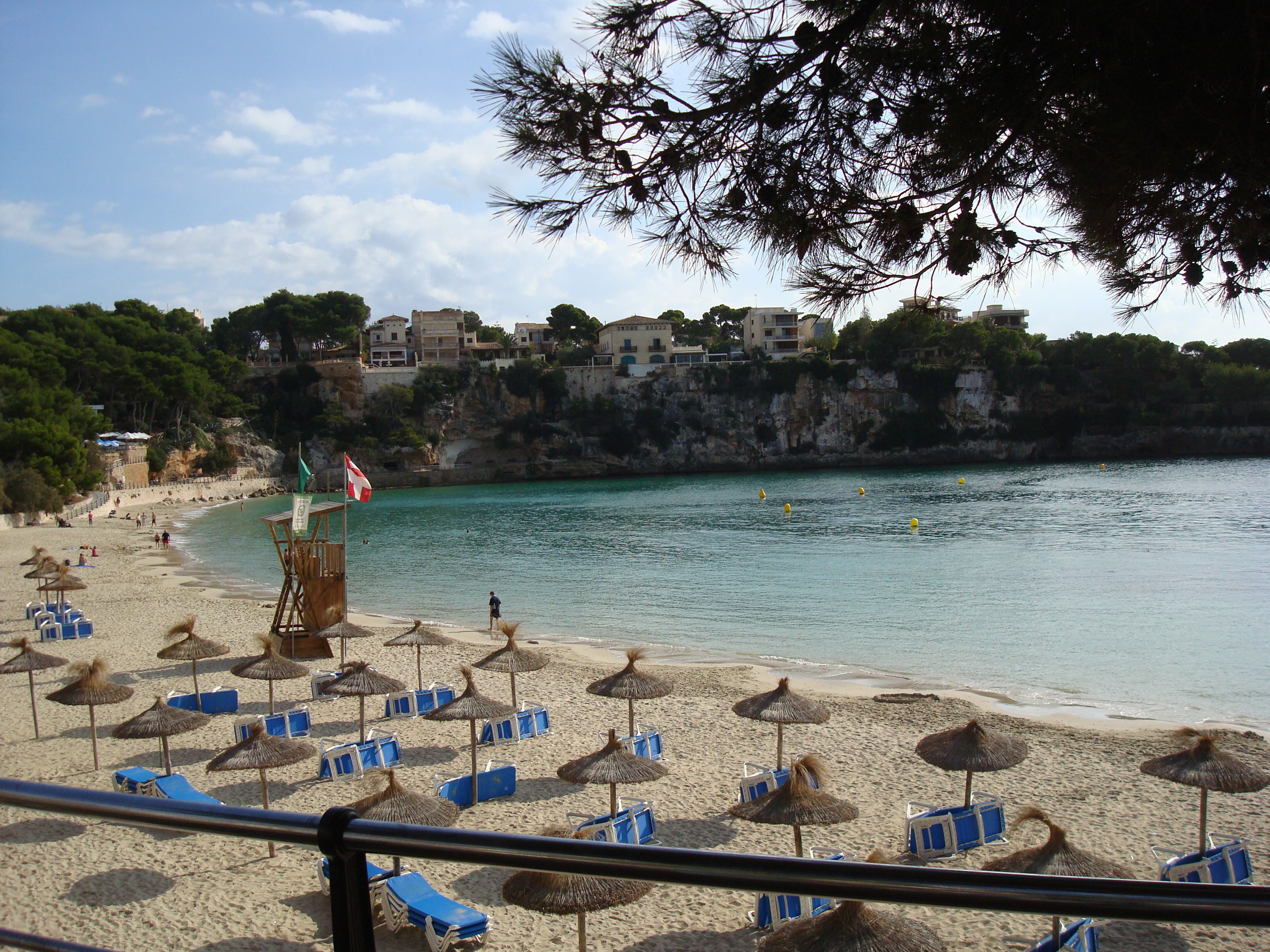
Beach of Porto Cristo

To improve the traffic flow in the main tourist season a by pass road around Porto Cristo has now been opened. This new road connects the PMV 4023 to the MA 4020 and MA 4014.

The name Porto Cristo, meaning "The Port of Christ" given to it back in 1260 AD at the time of the Christian reconquest of Mallorca, A fishing boat was found washed up on the beach containing a crucifix. Legend has it that an ox was carrying an icon of God through the town, and the ox stopped and refused to walk anymore. Hence the people saw this as a sign and the name was derived from that belief it was a clear sign that Christ wanted to be here.

What sets Porto Cristo apart from most of the other Mallorcan resorts is that its income is not solely dependent on tourism; Porto Cristo still maintains its functions as a Spanish fishing village. Its larger municipality, Manacor, is the centre of the pearl manufacturing industry on Mallorca.

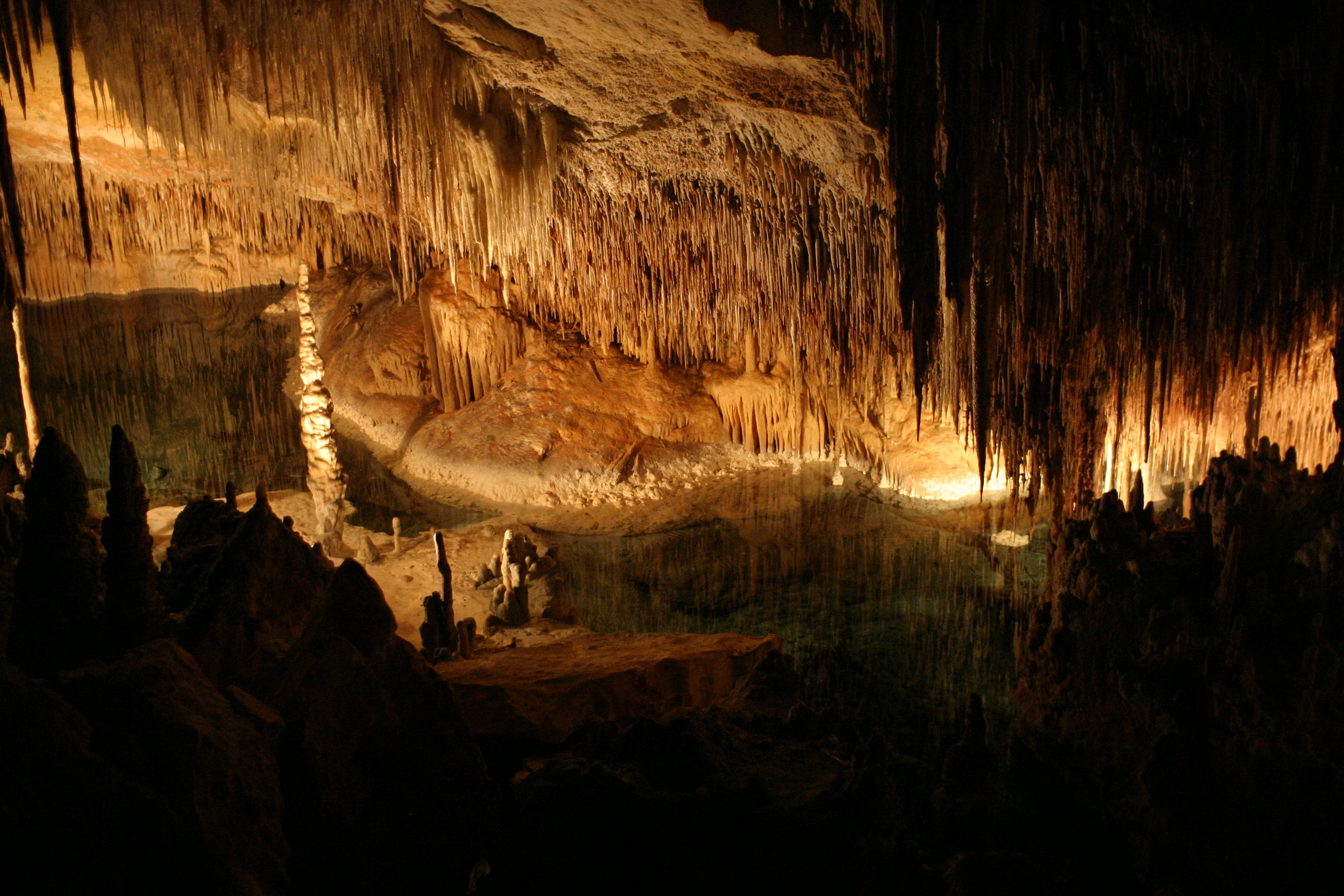
Coves del Drach

Porto Cristo Harbour is a natural harbour which shelters small fishing boats from storms. The addition in recent years of the new marina now provides moorings to high-end pleasure boats. The mix of the new and the old helps Porto Cristo retain its heritage.

== Residents ==
Professional tennis player Rafael Nadal has a holiday home in Porto Cristo.
