= List of municipalities in the Balearic Islands =

Map of Spain with Balearic Islands highlighted

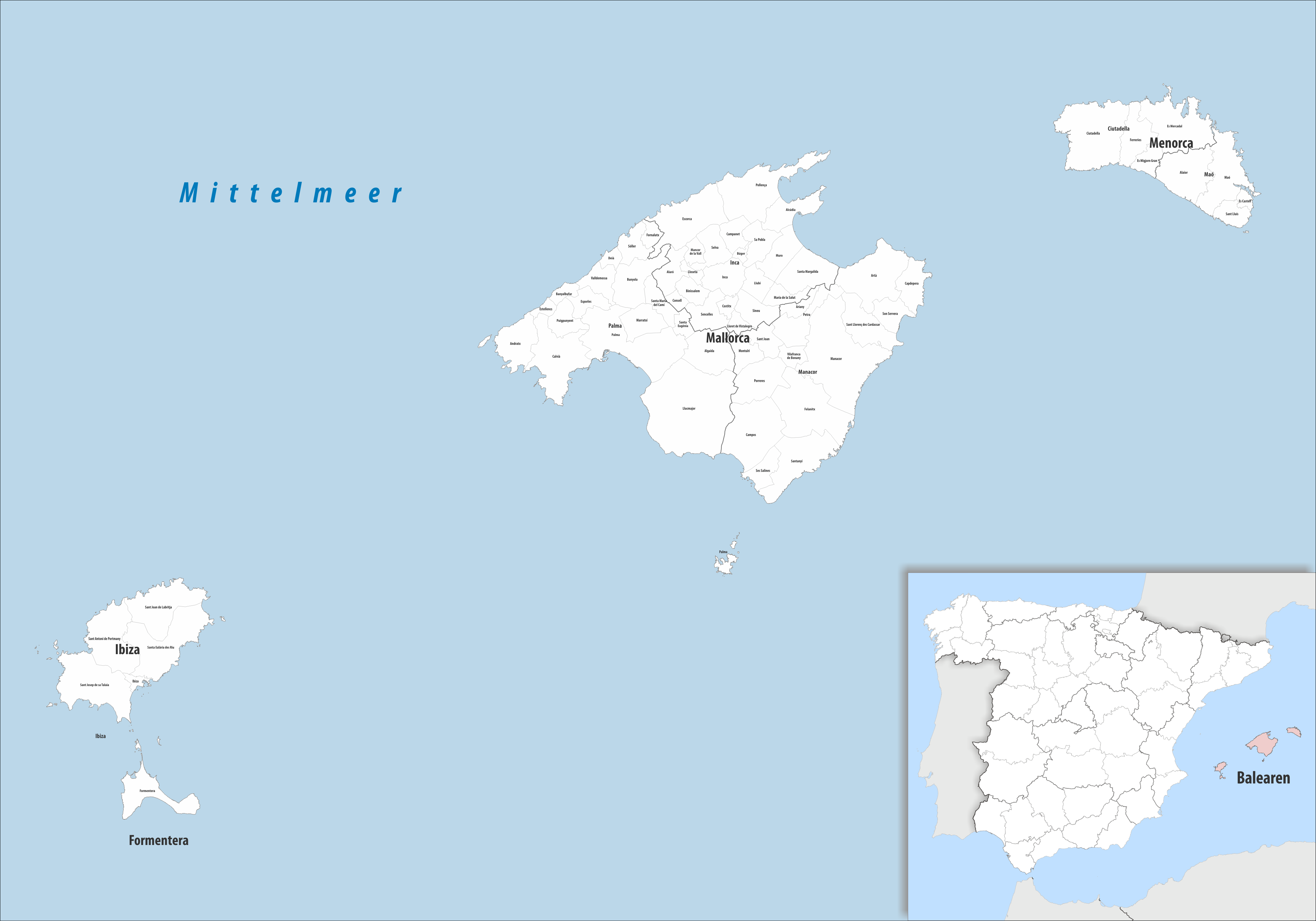
Map of the municipalities in the province of the Balearic Islands

The Balearic Islands are a province and autonomous community in Spain and lie in the Mediterranean Sea east of mainland Spain. They are divided into 67 municipalities - 53 on the island of Mallorca (Majorca), 8 on the island of Menorca (Minorca), 5 on the island of Eivissa (Ibiza) and 1 comprising the island of Formentera.

The municipalities are grouped into 9 comarques ("comarcas" in Castilian Spanish) - six on the island of Mallorca (Palma de Mallorca, Serra de Tramuntana, Raiguer, Pla de Mallorca, Migjorn and Llevant), while the other islands each form one comarque. In the table below, Serra de Tramuntana and Pla de Mallorca are abbreviated to "Serra" and "Pla" respectively.

The Catalan form is the sole official one. Older texts may use Castilian (Spanish) forms or spellings and where different these names are given in brackets after the Catalan name.

== Municipalities ==
Largest municipalities in Balearic Islands by population

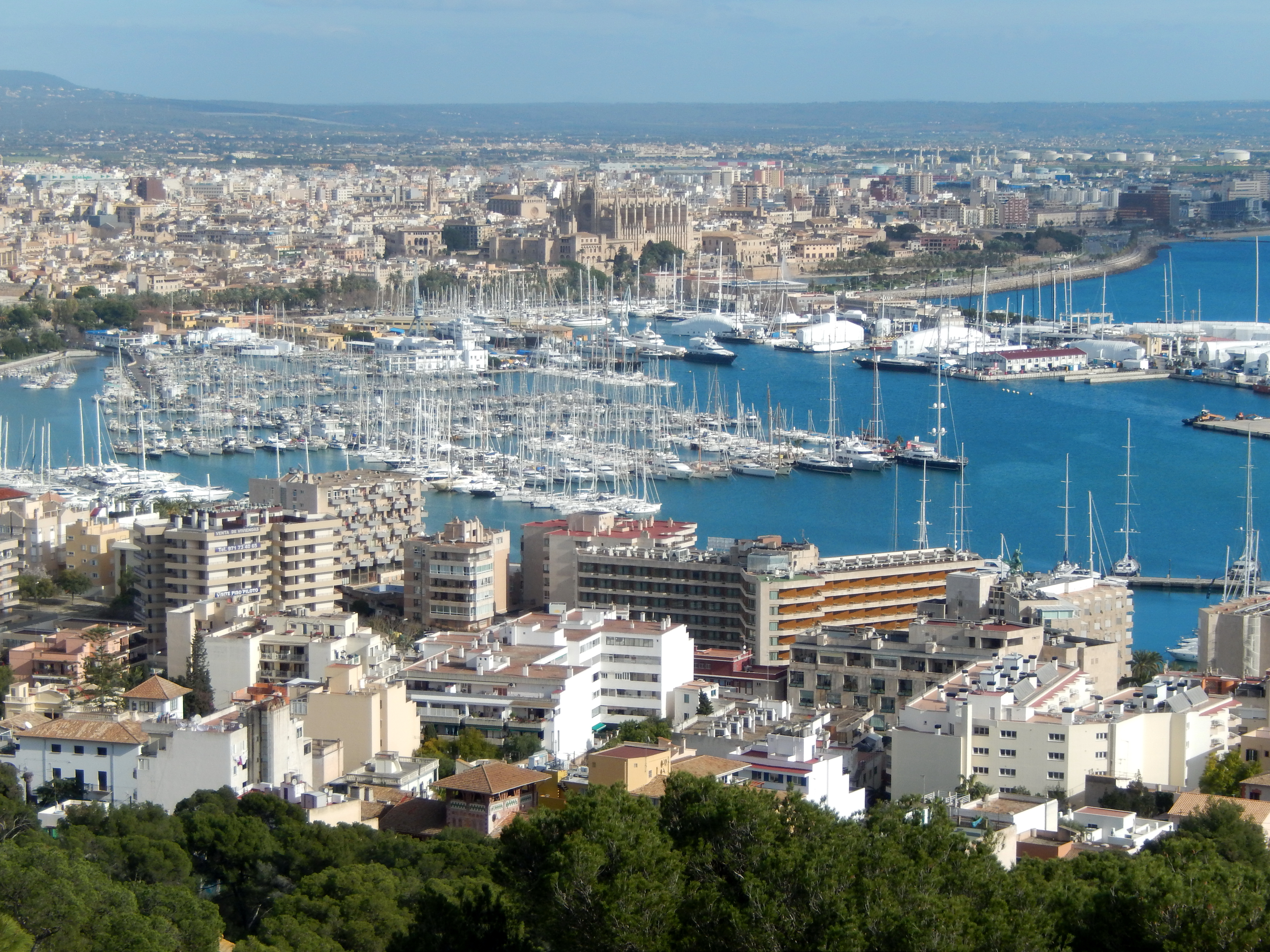
Aerial view of Palma, Balearic Islands' capital and largest municipality by population

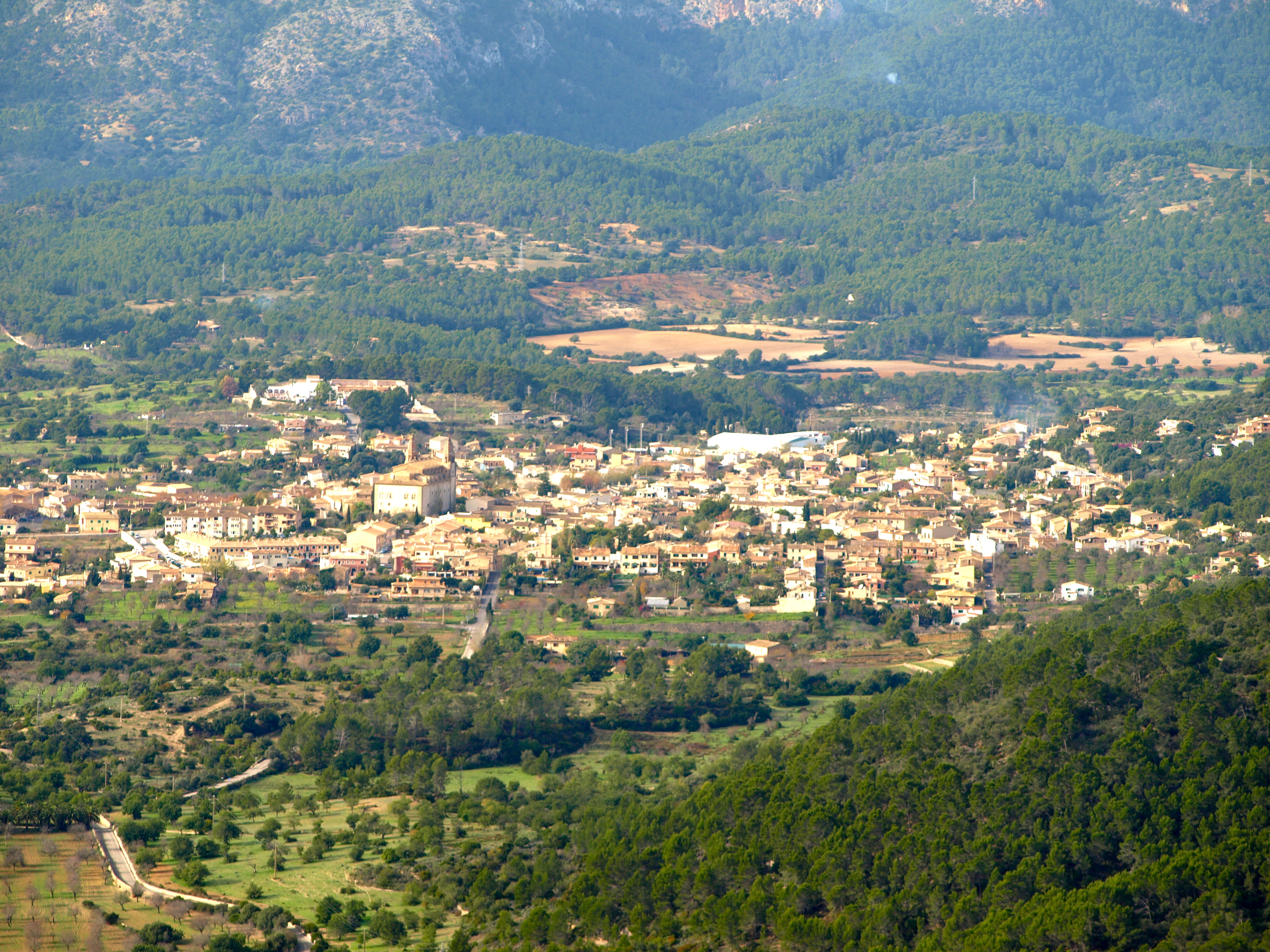
Aerial view of Calviá, Balearic Islands' second largest municipality by population

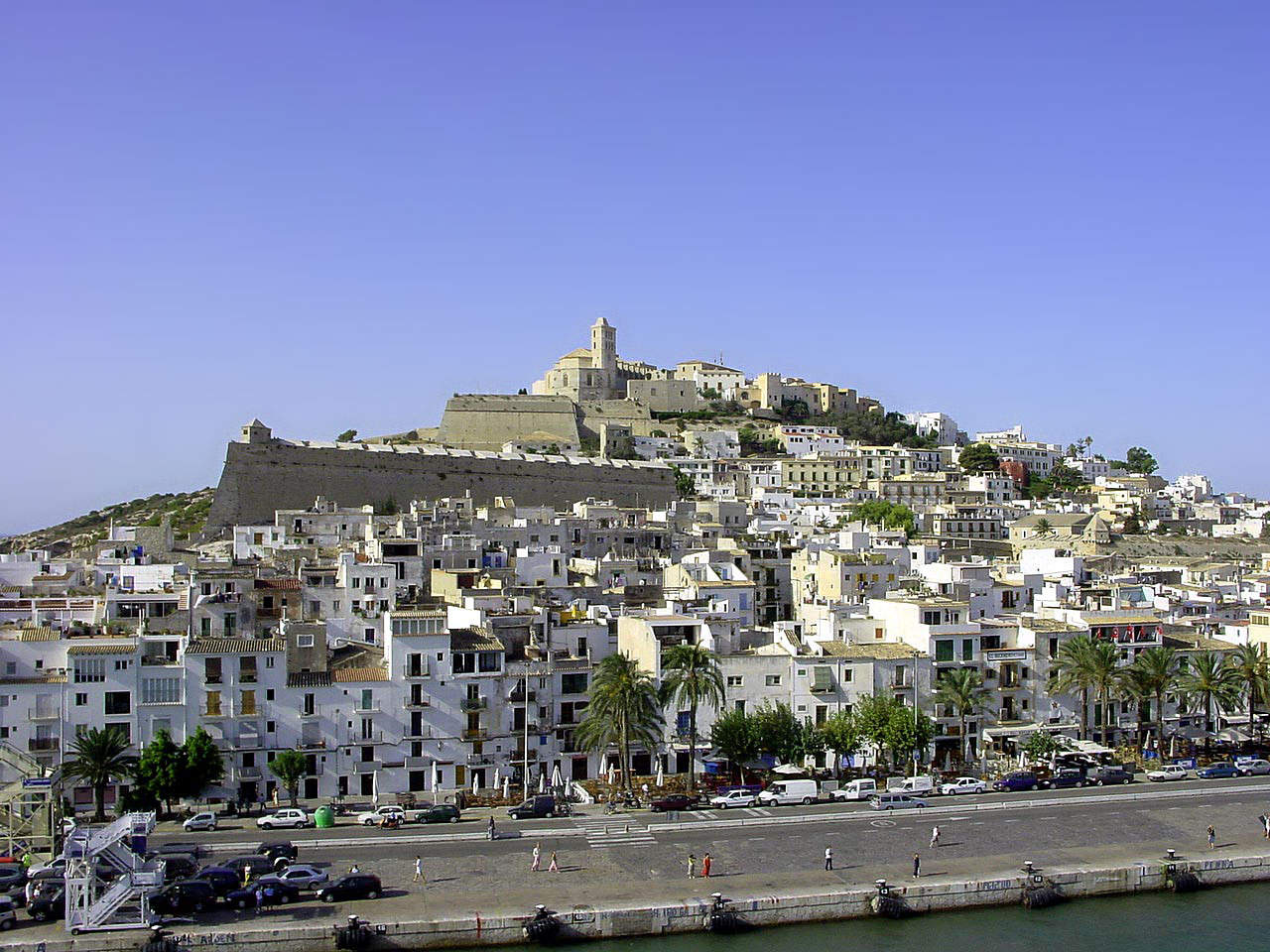
Aerial view of Ibiza, the third largest municipality by population in the Balearic Islands

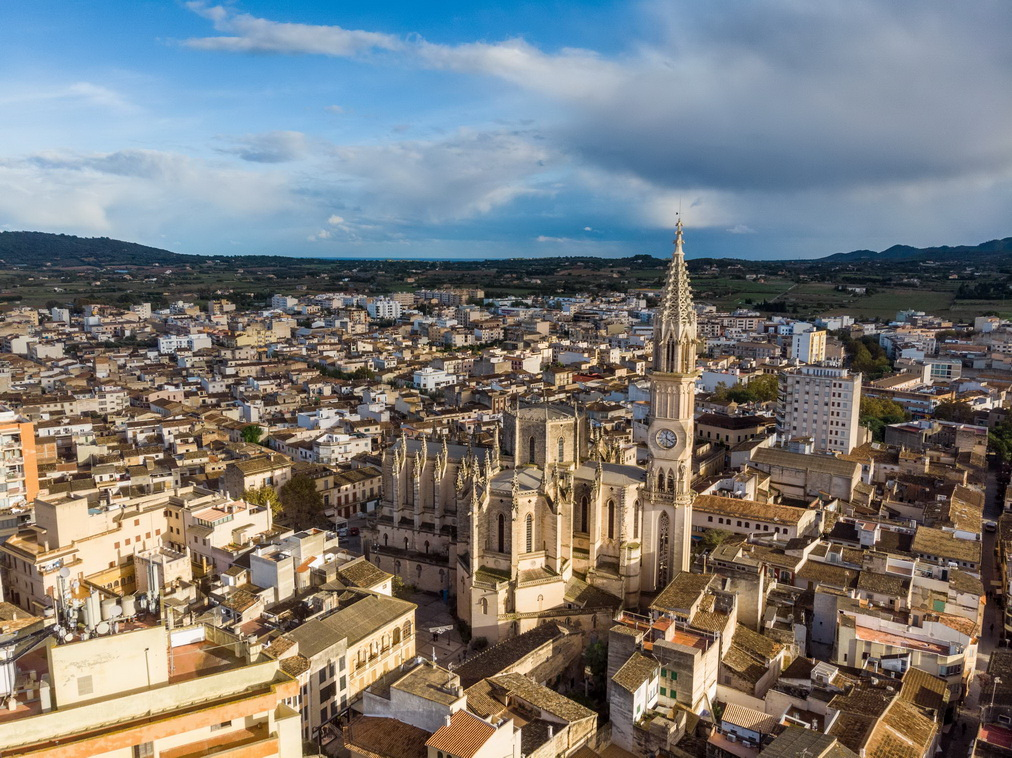
Aerial view of Manacor, Balearic Islands' fourth largest municipality by population

Name	Comarque	Island	Area (km^{2})	Population (2001)	Population (2011)	Population (2021)
Alaior	Menorca	Menorca	109.86	7,108	9,450	9,686
Alaró	Raiguer	Mallorca	45.71	4,050	5,273	5,800
Alcúdia (Alcudia)	Raiguer	Mallorca	60.02	12,500	18,914	20,694
Algaida	Pla	Mallorca	89.79	3,749	5,272	6,013
Andratx (Andrach)	Serra	Mallorca	81.45	7,753	11,234	11,780
Ariany	Pla	Mallorca	23.14	766	892	906
Artà	Llevant	Mallorca	139.78	6,176	7,562	8,180
Banyalbufar	Serra	Mallorca	18.06	517	559	541
Binissalem	Raiguer	Mallorca	29.77	5,166	7,640	8,931
Búger	Raiguer	Mallorca	8.29	950	1,014	1,089
Bunyola	Serra	Mallorca	84.70	5,029	6,270	7,115
Calvià	Serra	Mallorca	145.01	35,977	49,807	51,831
Campanet	Raiguer	Mallorca	34.65	2,309	2,536	2,654
Campos	Migjorn	Mallorca	149.69	6,360	9,712	11,471
Capdepera	Llevant	Mallorca	54.92	8,239	11,281	12,212
Es Castell	Menorca	Menorca	11.66	6,424	7,895	7,688
Ciutadella de Menorca	Menorca	Menorca	186.37	23,103	29,510	30,766
Consell	Raiguer	Mallorca	13.70	2,407	3,778	4,240
Costitx	Pla	Mallorca	15.37	924	1,113	1,398
Deià	Serra	Mallorca	15.21	654	684	686
Escorca	Serra	Mallorca	139.37	257	258	183
Esporles	Serra	Mallorca	35.30	4,066	4,845	5,153
Estellencs	Serra	Mallorca	13.44	347	363	326
Felanitx	Migjorn	Mallorca	169.71	14,882	18,045	18,211
Ferreries	Menorca	Menorca	66.09	4,048	4,667	4,903
Formentera	Formentera	Formentera	83.22	5,553	10,583	11,891
Fornalutx	Serra	Mallorca	19.49	618	695	681
Ibiza (Eivissa)	Eivissa	Eivissa	11.14	34,826	48,550	50,566
Inca	Raiguer	Mallorca	58.34	23,029	30,359	33,719
Lloret de Vistalegre	Pla	Mallorca	17.44	981	1,308	1,469
Lloseta	Raiguer	Mallorca	12.10	4,760	5,690	6,318
Llubí	Pla	Mallorca	34.92	1,806	2,235	2,405
Llucmajor (Lluchmayor)	Migjorn	Mallorca	327.25	24,277	35,995	38,475
Manacor	Llevant	Mallorca	260.26	31,255	40,348	44,878
Mancor de la Vall	Raiguer	Mallorca	19.89	892	1,321	1,570
Mahón (Maó)	Menorca	Menorca	117.18	23,315	28,789	29,648
Maria de la Salut	Pla	Mallorca	30.52	1,972	2,122	2,235
Marratxí (Marrachí)	Raiguer	Mallorca	54.22	23,410	34,538	38,351
Es Mercadal	Menorca	Menorca	138.34	3,089	5,292	5,474
Es Migjorn Gran	Menorca	Menorca	31.42	1,167	1,520	1,512
Montuïri (Montuiri)	Pla	Mallorca	41.13	2,344	2,856	3,061
Muro	Pla	Mallorca	58.59	6,107	7,010	7,547
Palma	Palma	Mallorca	208.59	333,801	402,044	424,837
Petra	Pla	Mallorca	70.05	1,911	2,876	3,051
Sa Pobla (La Puebla)	Raiguer	Mallorca	48.59	10,388	12,999	14,064
Pollença (Pollensa)	Serra	Mallorca	151.58	13,808	16,057	16,903
Porreres	Pla	Mallorca	86.91	4,069	5,459	5,630
Puigpunyent	Serra	Mallorca	42.31	1,250	1,878	2,073
Ses Salines (Las Salinas)	Migjorn	Mallorca	39.11	3,389	5,007	5,021
Sant Antoni de Portmany	Eivissa	Eivissa	126.80	15,081	21,915	27,582
Sant Joan (San Juan)	Pla	Mallorca	38.54	1,634	2,029	2,173
Sant Joan de Labritja	Eivissa	Eivissa	121.66	4,094	5,351	6,610
Sant Josep de sa Talaia (San José)	Eivissa	Eivissa	159.42	14,267	24,079	29,015
Sant Llorenç des Cardassar	Llevant	Mallorca	82.08	6,503	8,490	9,058
Sant Lluís	Menorca	Menorca	34.76	3,279	7,275	7,056
Santa Eugènia	Pla	Mallorca	20.25	1,224	1,686	1,774
Santa Eulària del Riu (Santa Eulalia del Río)	Eivissa	Eivissa	153.57	19,808	33,699	40,413
Santa Margalida (Santa Margarita)	Llevant	Mallorca	86.53	7,800	11,725	12,830
Santa Maria del Camí (Santa María del Camino)	Raiguer	Mallorca	37.62	4,959	6,443	7,526
Santanyí	Migjorn	Mallorca	124.87	8,875	12,427	12,364
Selva	Raiguer	Mallorca	48.75	2,927	3,699	4,113
Sencelles (Sancellas)	Pla	Mallorca	52.86	2,146	3,113	3,616
Sineu	Pla	Mallorca	47.74	2,736	3,696	4,156
Sóller	Serra	Mallorca	42.79	10,961	13,882	13,621
Son Servera	Llevant	Mallorca	42.57	9,432	11,915	12,072
Valldemossa	Serra	Mallorca	42.93	1,708	1,990	2,047
Vilafranca de Bonany	Pla	Mallorca	23.95	2,466	2,984	3,553
Totals				841,669	1,100,503	1,183,415

== See also ==
- Geography of Spain
- List of Spanish cities
