= List of windmills in Spain =

The most famous and known are those of La Mancha, thanks to medieval novel Don Quixote.

This is an incomplete list of windmills in Spain. you can help expanding the article.

== Aragon ==
=== Province of Huesca ===
Location	Name of mill and coordinates	Type	Built	Notes	Photograph
	Mill of Fañanás				
Malanquilla	Mill of Malanquilla	Tower			
Malanquilla	Mill of Malanquilla	Tower			
Ojos Negros, Teruel	Mill of Ojos Negros	Tower			

== Andalusia ==
=== Province of Almería ===
Location	Name of mill and coordinates	Type	Built	Notes	Photograph
El Pozo de los Frailes	Mill of El Pozo de los Frailes	Tower			
San Isidro de Níjar	Mill of El San Isidro de Níjar	Tower			

=== Province of Cádiz ===
Location	Name of mill and coordinates	Type	Built	Notes	Photograph
	Mill del Duque				
Vejer de la Frontera	Mill del Vejer de la Frontera	Tower			

=== Province of Córdoba ===
Location	Name of mill and coordinates	Type	Built	Notes	Photograph
	Mills of the Guadalquivir				
	Mill of la Albolafia				
	Mill of la Alegría				
	Mill of Carbonell				
	Mill of Casillas				
	Mill of Enmedio				
	Mill of Lope García				
	Mill of Martos				
	Mill of Pápalo				
	Mill of San Antonio				
	Mill of San Lorenzo				
	Mill of San Rafael				

=== Province of Huelva ===
Location	Name of mill and coordinates	Type	Built	Notes	Photograph
	Mill of El Pintado				

=== Province of Jaén ===
Location	Name of mill and coordinates	Type	Built	Notes	Photograph
	Mill del Cubo (Torredonjimeno)				

== Balearic Islands ==
Location	Name of mill and coordinates	Type	Built	Notes	Photograph
Algaida	Molí d'Algaida	Tower			
Binlagant	Molí Binlagant	Tower			
Camí de Son Tugores	Molí Redona	Tower			
Costitx	Molí de Can Vallés	Tower			
Eivissa, Ibiza	Molí d'en Fèlix	Tower			
Eivissa	Molí d'en Pep Joan	Tower			
Eivissa	Molí d'en Toni Joan	Tower			
Eivissa	Molí des Puig d'en Valls	Tower			
Formentera		Tower			
Llucmajor	Molí Sa Torre	Tower			
Marraxti	Molí des Fang	Tower			
Menorca	Molí des Compte	Tower			
Menorca	Molí des Cami	Tower			
Palma	Mills of Es Jonquet	Tower			
Palma	Mills del Carter (4 mills)	Tower			
Randa	Molí de Randa	Tower			
Santa Ponça	Molí Santa Ponça	Tower			
Sant Lluís, Menorca	Molí de Dalt	Tower			
S'Arenal		Tower			
Sencelles	(3 mills)	Tower			
Ses Salines	Molí de Ses Salines	Tower			
Son Fornés	Moli de Son Fornés	Tower			
Son Servera	Molí Serra de Pula	Tower			
Son Servera	Molí Son Servera	Tower			

== Basque Country ==
=== Biscay ===
Location	Name of mill and coordinates	Type	Built	Notes	Photograph
Aixerrota	Molino de Aixerrota	Tower			

== Cantabria ==
Location	Name of mill and coordinates	Type	Built	Notes	Photograph
	Mill of Castellanos				
	Mill of La Venera				
	Mill of Victoria				

== Castile-La Mancha ==
Location	Name of mill and coordinates	Type	Built	Notes	Photograph
	Mills of the Córcoles				
	Mill of la Pasadilla				
	Mill of Roldán				
	Mill Nuevo				
	Mill of los frutos				
	Mill Rodríguez				
	Mill of María Antonia				
	Mill del Fraile				
	Mill of la Iglesia				
	Mill of los Atienzas				
	Mill del Garbancero				
	Mill del Concejo				
	Mill del Santo 1				
	Mill del Santo 2				
Tierra de Campos	Windmills in Tierra de Campos				

=== Province of Ciudad Real ===
Location	Name of mill and coordinates	Type	Built	Notes	Photograph
	Windmill of Valdepeñas			Considered one of the largest windmills in the world.	
Campo de Criptana	Windmills in Campo de Criptana	Tower		Of the thirty or forty windmills that identified Cervantes in Don Quixote, it is now possible to find ten.	

=== Province of Cuenca ===
Location	Name of mill and coordinates	Type	Built	Notes	Photograph
Mota del Cuervo	Windmills of Mota del Cuervo (7 mills)				

=== Province of Toledo ===
Location	Name of mill and coordinates	Type	Built	Notes	Photograph
	Windmill La Unión				
Consuegra	Windmills of Consuegra	Tower		Twelve of the original thirteen mills are preserved:- Alcancía, Bolero, Caballero del Verde Gabán, Cardeño, Chispas, Clavileño, Espartero, Mambrino, Mochilas, Rucio, Sancho and Vista Alegre	

== Catalonia ==
=== Province of Lleida ===
Location	Name of mill and coordinates	Type	Built	Notes	Photograph
	Mill del Plomall				

=== Province of Tarragona ===
Location	Name of mill and coordinates	Type	Built	Notes	Photograph
	Mills of la Vila (Montblanc)				
	Mill of la Volta				
	Mill Xic				

== Canary Islands ==
Location	Name of mill and coordinates	Type	Built	Notes	Photograph
Gran Canaria	Mill of Cazorla (San Bartolomé de Tirajana)				

== Murcia ==
Location	Name of mill and coordinates	Type	Built	Notes	Photograph
	Windmills of the Campo de Cartagena				
	Mill of Chirrín (Abanilla)				
	Flour Mill of La Pinilla (Palas-Pinilla, Fuente Álamo)				
	Mill of Arriba (Sucina, Murcia)				
	Mill of Azaraque (Alhama de Murcia)				
	Mill of la Parra (Jumilla)				
	Mill of Abajo en Murcia (Sucina, Murcia)				
	Mill of El Berro (El Berro, Alhama de Murcia)				
	Mill House Farm of Ramonete (Ramonete, Lorca)				
	Casa Torrica (Corvera, Murcia)				
	Mill of Despeñaperros (Alhama de Murcia)				
	Mill of Torregrosa (Avilés, Lorca)				
	Mill of Pudrimel de La Manga del Mar Menor (La Manga, San Javier)				
	Mill of Abajo (Bullas)				
	Mill Casa Grande (Lorca)				
	Mills Salineros (San Pedro del Pinatar)				
	Mills la Canal (Bullas)				
	Mills of Viquejos (Morata, Lorca)				
	Mills of Quintín de San Pedro del Pinatar (Lo Pagán, San Pedro del Pinatar)				
	Mill of Arriba (Bullas)				
	Mill Casa de la Pastora (Ramonete, Lorca)				
	Mill of Agua de los Camachos (Los Camachos, Torre Pacheco)				
	Flour Mill del Río (Archivel, Caravaca de la Cruz)				
	Mill del Río Amir I (Ramonete, Lorca)				
	Mill del Tío Pacorro (Torre Pacheco)				
	Mill of La Cerca (Santa Ana, Cartagena)				
	Mill of la Condomina de Palacios Blancos en Lorquí (Palacios Blancos, Lorquí)				
	Mill del Pasico(Hortichuela, Torre Pacheco)				
	Mill of Agua de Molino Derribao (Santa Ana, Cartagena)				
	Mill of Viento de Calnegre (Mazarrón)				
	Mill of los Paquillos (Balsicas, Torre Pacheco)				
	Molinico de la Huerta (Cieza)				
	Mill of Leiva (Leiva, Mazarrón)				
	Mill of Hortichuela (Hortichuela, Torre Pacheco)				
	Mill of Cebollo (Cieza)				
	Flour Mill of La Majada (La Majada, Mazarrón)				

== Valencian Community ==
=== Province of Castellón ===
Location	Name of mill and coordinates	Type	Built	Notes	Photograph
	Mill of aceite (Cervera del Maestre)				

=== Province of Valencia ===
Location	Name of mill and coordinates	Type	Built	Notes	Photograph
		Mill of Las Fuentes			
	Mill del Pocillo				
