= Santa Margalida =

- Municipality
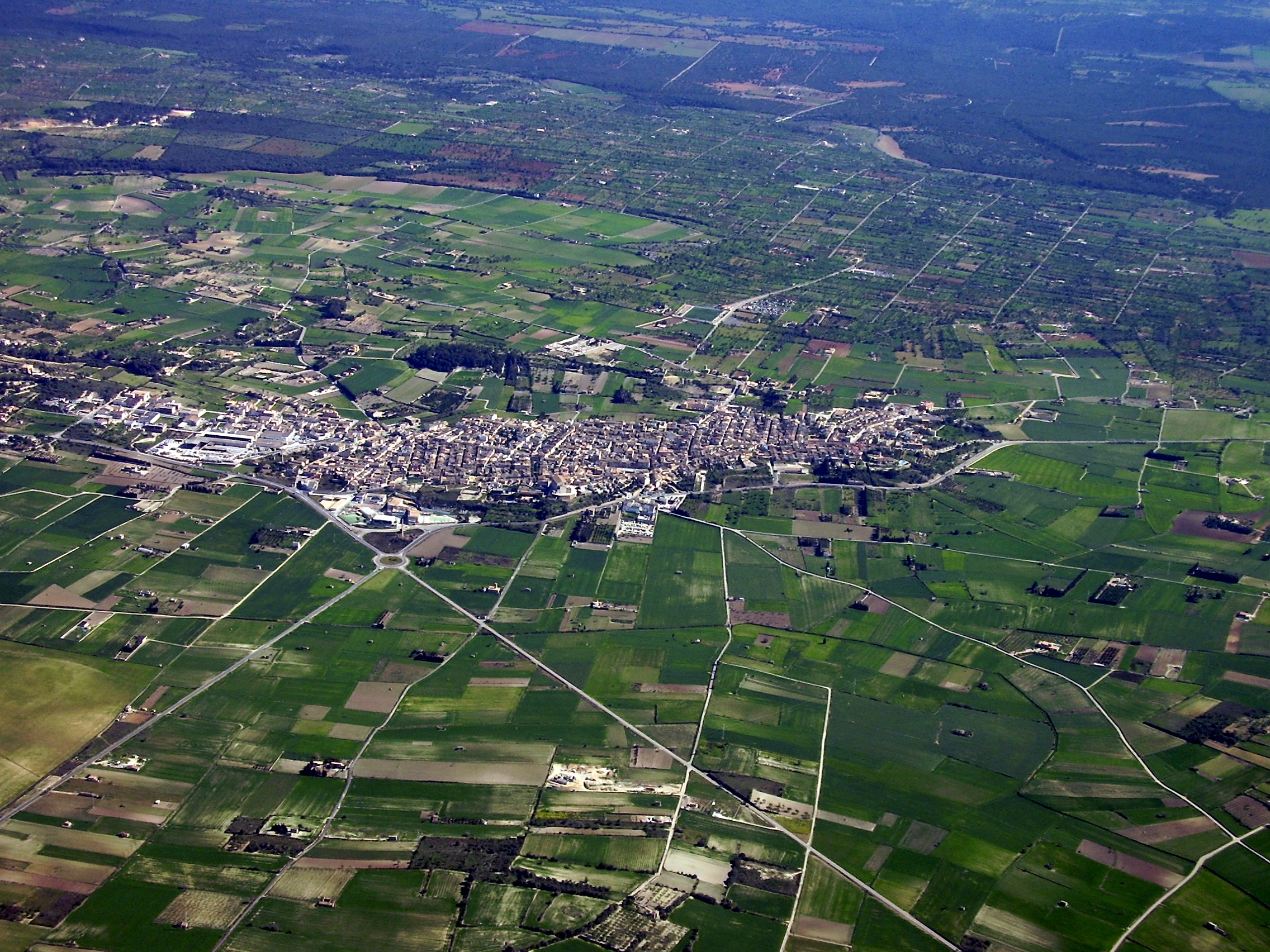

- Coat of arms

- Map of Santa Margalida in Mallorca

- Location in Mallorca Santa Margalida (Balearic Islands) Santa Margalida (Spain)
- Coordinates: 39°42′12″N 3°6′13″E
- Country: Spain
- Autonomous community: Balearic Islands
- Province: Balearic Islands
- Island: Mallorca
- Comarca: Llevant
- Judicial district: Inca

Government
  - Alcalde: Joan Monjo Estelrich (2025) (Coalició Convergència)

Area
  - Total: 86.51 km^{2} (33.40 sq mi)
- Elevation: 100 m (330 ft)

Population (2025-01-01)
  - Total: 14,056
  - Density: 162.5/km^{2} (420.8/sq mi)
- Demonym(s): Margalidà, -ana and their internal variations Viler, -a; Picaforter, -a; Sonserramarí, -ina.
- Time zone: UTC+1 (CET)
  - Summer (DST): UTC+2 (CEST)
- Official language(s): Catalan Spanish
- Website: Official website

Santa Margalida (Balearic Catalan: [səntə məɾɣəˈliðə]) is a municipality on Mallorca, one of the Balearic Islands in Spain. It has a population of about 10,000.

The municipality includes three settlements, the main one being Santa Margalida, 10 kilometres (6.2 mi) away from the coast. Two smaller settlements are also included in the municipality: Can Picafort and Son Serra de Marina, which are touristic towns directly located on the coast of the bay of Alcúdia.

The non-national population stands at 23.6% (2,413).

== Geography ==
=== Geographical location ===
The municipality of Santa Margalida lies about 45 kilometres (28 mi) from the island's capital, Palma. It is part of the region (comarca) Pla de Mallorca or Es Pla, the central plain of the island.

The municipality is one of the flattest on Mallorca at very little more than 100 metres (330 ft) above sea level. The area is drained by a few streams which flow towards the sea in the northeast. In the northwest, Santa Margalida is bordered by a fresh-water swamp. Along the northeastern coast, there are obelisks at regular intervals of 1,250 metres (4,100 ft). These, along with corresponding twin towers 200 metres (660 ft) inland, were used in the 19th century as navigational points of reference for seafarers.

=== Neighbouring municipalities ===
In the northwest, Santa Margalida is bordered by Muro and Llubí. Both of which belong to Es Plà, along with Maria de la Salut, Ariany and Petra to the south. In the east, the Torrent de na Borges - the longest stream in Mallorca - forms the border to Artà in the Llevant region.

=== Community arrangement ===
The municipality of Santa Margalida has three towns. The following population figures date from 1 January 2005, and don't include the population outside these settlements, hence the sum of the figures does not add up to the total population of the municipality (Source: INE).

- Can Picafort (5,685 Inhabitants)
- Santa Margalida (3,195 Inhabitants)
- Son Serra de Marina (535 Inhabitants)

==== Santa Margalida ====
Due to the presence of archeological sites, it has been proven that the region has been inhabited since 7 c. BCE - 2 c. BCE.

During the muslim occupation, the region belonged to the district of Muruh, which during the Reconquista was divided in between the parish of Muro and the parish of Santa Margalida. Development around the parish led to the founding of the village of Santa Margalida, and despite the collapse of the main building in a fire on 1320, it was rebuilt in the same location.

It is stated in the Llibre del Repartiment that count Ponç IV d'Empúries would be the ruler of the territory. For centuries Santa Margalida would not develop much, and the main economic activity was agriculture, focusing on cereal.

During the reign of the Catholic Monarchs, inhabitants of Santa Margalida would migrate to Tàrbena, Alicante. The reasoning behind this was the expelling of the Morisco population, leading to the need for able workers. This is why the catalan dialect spoken on Tàrbena has some features similar to balearic catalan.

- La Beata is the main celebration of the town. Due to the cultural origins of the municipality, it is based on religious beliefs venerating a saint. This cultural celebration takes place yearly, on the first sunday of September. This festivity is held in great esteem by the Margalidans due to the fact that it hails the town's patron.

==== Can Picafort ====
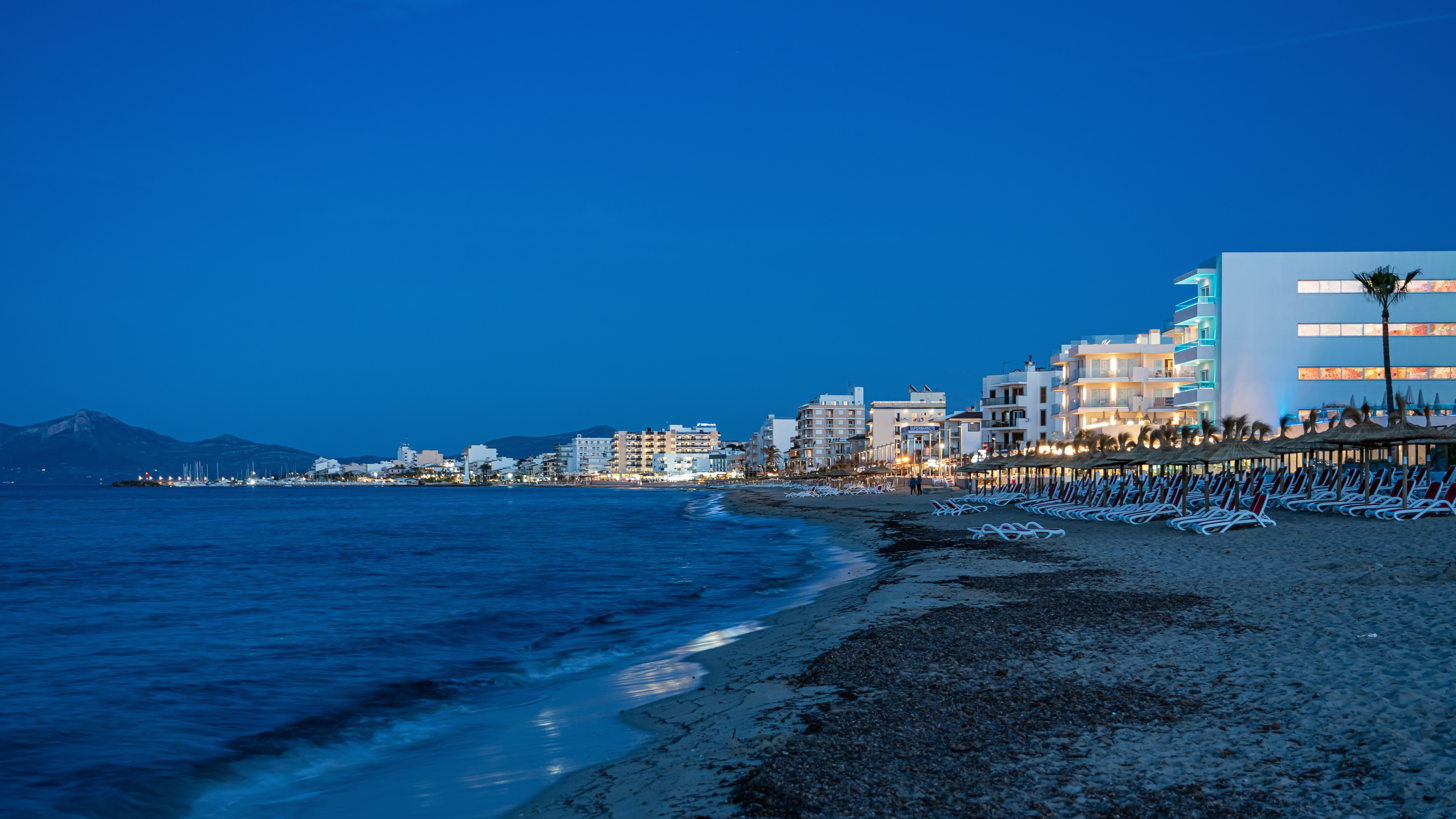
Can Picafort beach

Can Picafort (or Ca'n Picafort) is a coastal town on the Bay of Alcúdia. Between the Port d'Alcudia in the north of the bay and Can Picafort, there is a five-kilometre (3.1 mi) long sandy beach lined with hotels and restaurants.

The origins of the town take place around the end of XIX c. when Jeroni "Picafort" Fuster, alongside other Margalidans decided to build summer residences closer to the beach as well as deciding to invest into fishing. The focus of the village would be fishing and the development would be quite low for most of the village's existence, but due to the interest in tourism and the transition to democracy, the population increased, overtaking Santa Margalida in the 1990s.

During the Spanish Civil War, the Nationalist faction built bunkers on the rocky seaside in order to repel a possible Republican faction amphibian invasion. These bunkers were maintained in case the Allies attempted an attack during World War II. From 1950 onwards, no military document mentions them again. Their mainteinance was stopped short after the end of the conflict without ever being used.

Can Picafort is well set up for tourism and the beach's promenade offers many Bars and Restaurants, as well as services and rentals. This town is the main economic powerhouse of the municipality, focusing on tourism, despite the presence of an industrial estate.

Can Picafort isn't just popular during peak season. Off-Season, due to the mild winters and relatively flat terrain, the town is frequented by cyclists. It is however considerably quieter and many of the businesses close.

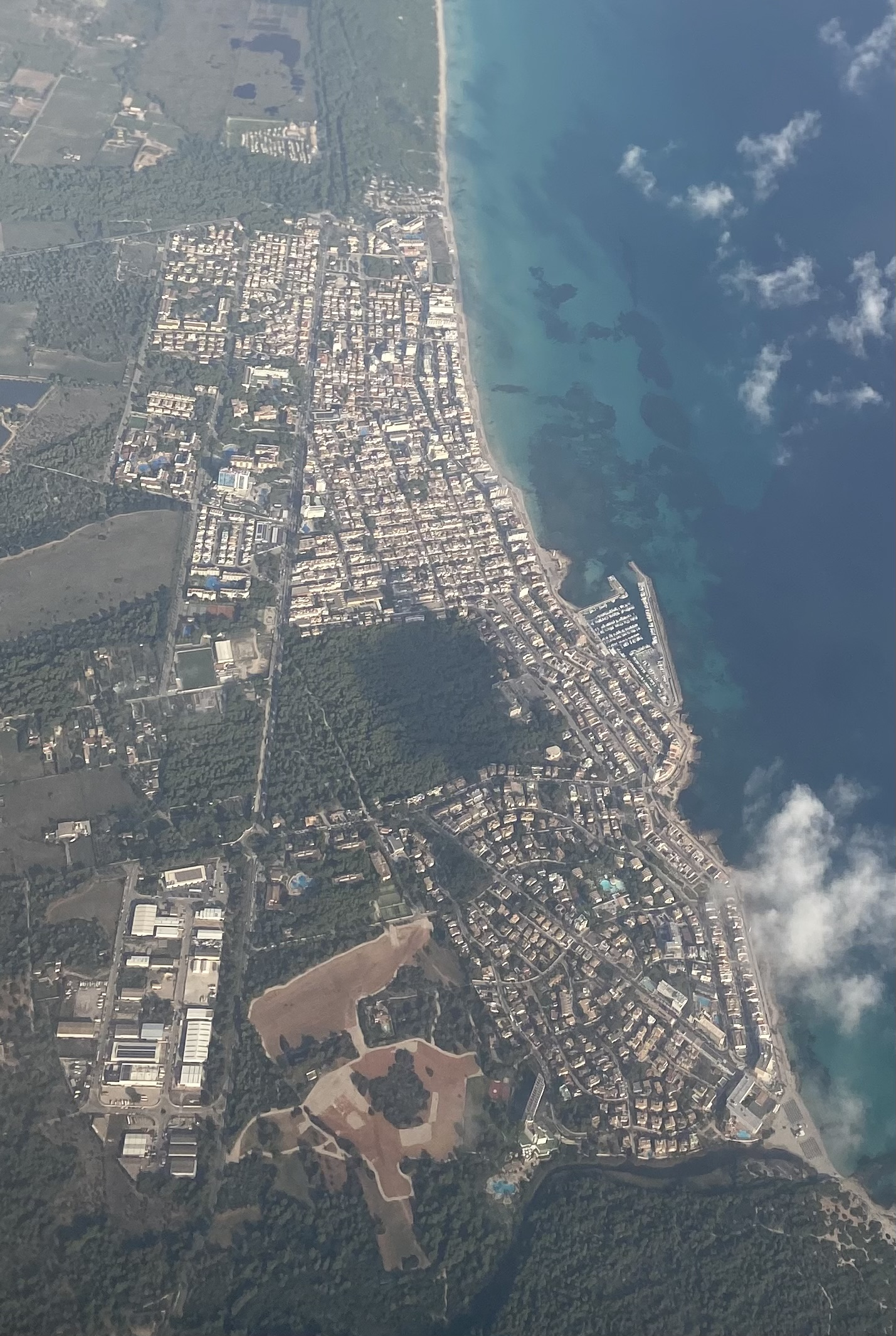
Aerial view of Can Picafort

In the 1990s, the population here exceeded that of the main town Santa Margalida and the town has become an important residence. Major items of infrastructure can also be found here such as a town hall, a library, a police station and a sports center.

- Necropolis de Son Real: A short hike southeast alongside the beach would lead to the necropolis of Son Real, a pre-historic (7 c. BCE - 2 c. BCE) burial site on the seaside rediscovered on the twentieth century unique to the Balearic Islands, which has been severely vandalized and has gone through restoration efforts. Situated closeby is a minute island, S'Illot des Porros. Both are the remains of the Talaiot culture from the early history of Mallorca. From there, following the seaside path southeast would lead to Son Serra de Marina.
- Natural reserve of S'Albufera: wetland borders about 2 kilometres (1.2 mi) of the bay and prevents the two towns from joining. It is a protected natural park with abundant flora such as Reed, Fennel pondweed, Populus alba and Psathyrella. Fauna is also abundant, more than 303 bird species have been spotted due the Albufera being a spotover for migratory birds, while native Mullet and European eel, as well as Pelophylax perezi can also be found in the park. The park is also noteworthy for its naturally formed coastal dunes, which date over 10.000 years old.

==== Son Serra de Marina ====
This touristic village 6 kilometres (3.7 mi) south of Can Picafort extends for about 1,400 metres (4,600 ft) along the Bay of Alcúdia. It is built exclusively of two-storied houses, most of which have been constructed as secondary residences for locals. Streetlife there is accordingly quiet. Only during the holiday seasons will the owners come here from Palma or the mainland. In contrast to Can Picafort, mass tourism has not yet reached this place.

Son Serra de Marina features a small marina on its western beach. In the east, the town is limited by the Torrent de na Borges. The beach there is a resort for wind and kite surfers.

The town has three moderately frequented beaches. The local one west of the Torrent de na Borges, approximately 450 metres (1,480 ft) long and 130 metres (430 ft) wide, is mostly visited by local residents. East of the town lies the 1,800-metre (5,900 ft) long beach of Sa Canova, which belongs to the Artà municipality and almost extends to Colonia de Sant Pere's neighbourhood of S'Estanyol. To the west, slightly offside the settlement is the beach of Son Real. A hiking trail along the coast leads to Can Picafort.

== Sights ==
- Parish Church Santa Margalida
- Necropolis of Son Real and S'Illot des Porros (Talaiot culture)
- Parc natural de s'Albufera de Mallorca – bird sanctuary

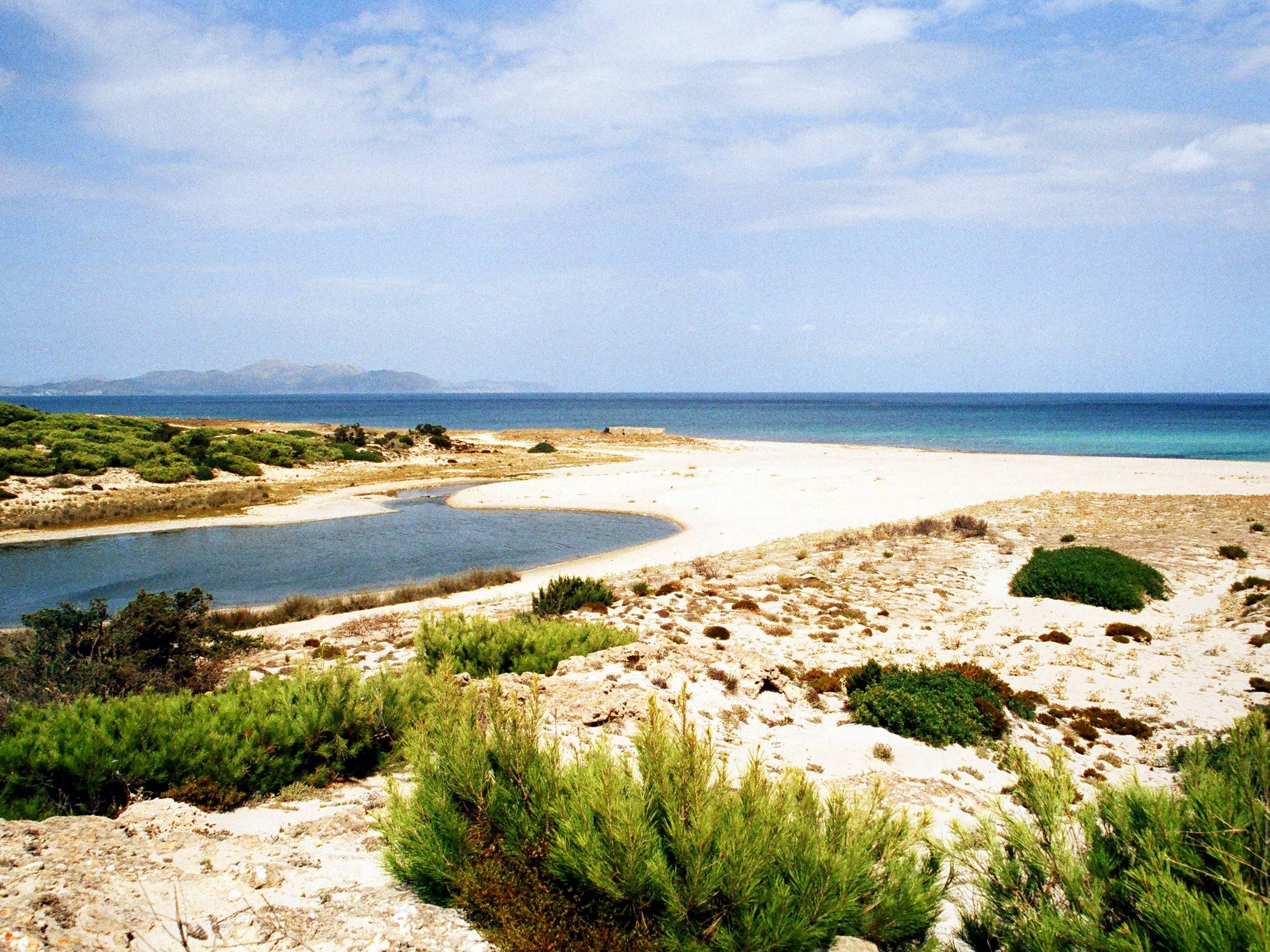
Son Real beach at Son Serra de Marina

Beaches and bays in the municipality of Santa Margalida include Platja de Can Picafort, Platja de son Bauló, s'Arenal d'en Casat, Cala Serralot, Platja de son Real, Platja de es Dolç and Platja de son Serra de Marina.

== Culture ==
- Festes de Santa Margalida, feast of the Patron Saint around 20 July
- Festes de la Beata, feast in honor of Saint Catherine of Palma, 1st Sunday in September

== Notable people ==
- Juan March (1880–1962), banker - founder of Banca March
