= Lloret de Vistalegre =

- Municipality
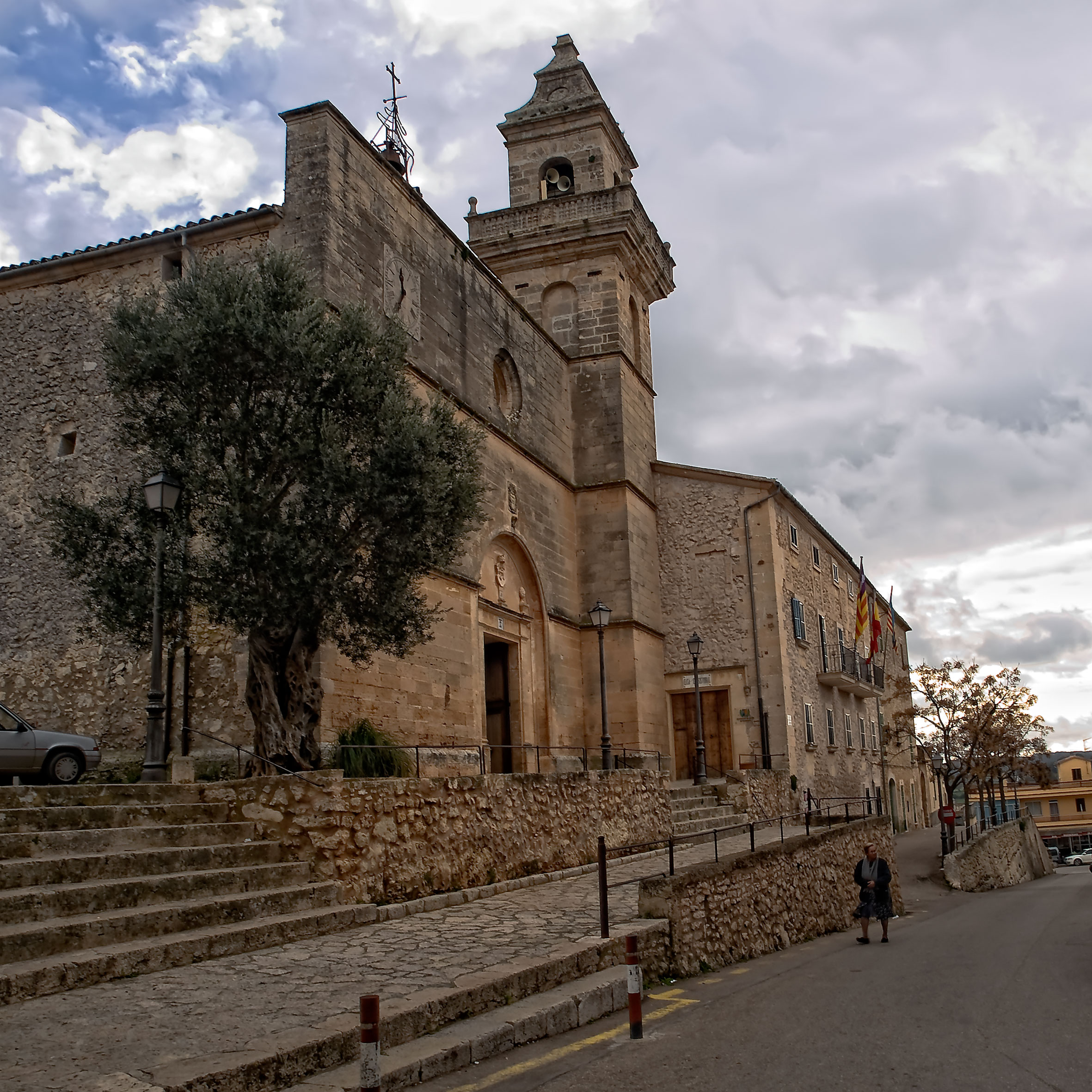
- Parish church of the Virgin of Loreto.

- Coat of arms

- Map of Lloret de Vistalegre in Mallorca

- Location in Mallorca Lloret de Vistalegre (Balearic Islands) Lloret de Vistalegre (Spain)
- Coordinates: 39°37′04″N 2°58′29″E
- Country: Spain
- Autonomous community: Balearic Islands
- Province: Balearic Islands
- Comarca: Pla de Mallorca
- Judicial district: Inca

Government
  - Mayor: Arnau Mateu Gelabert

Area
  - Total: 17.44 km^{2} (6.73 sq mi)
- Elevation: 152 m (499 ft)

Population (2025-01-01)
  - Total: 1,691
  - Density: 96.96/km^{2} (251.1/sq mi)
- Demonym: Lloritanos
- Time zone: UTC+1 (CET)
  - Summer (DST): UTC+2 (CEST)
- Postal code: 07518

Lloret de Vistalegre (Balearic Catalan: [ʎoˈɾəd də vistəˈleɣɾə]), also known as Llorito (Balearic Catalan: [ʎoˈɾito]), is a municipality located in the center of Mallorca, one of the Balearic Islands, Spain.

The municipalities bordering Lloret de Vistalegre are: Montuïri, Sineu, Sencelles, Algaida and Sant Joan.

At the beginning of August there is a major party called "Es Sequer", which is a gastronomical celebration of the fig harvest.

The municipality activities are mainly revolved around agriculture, livestock and some rural tourism establishments.
