= Sant Joan =

- Municipality
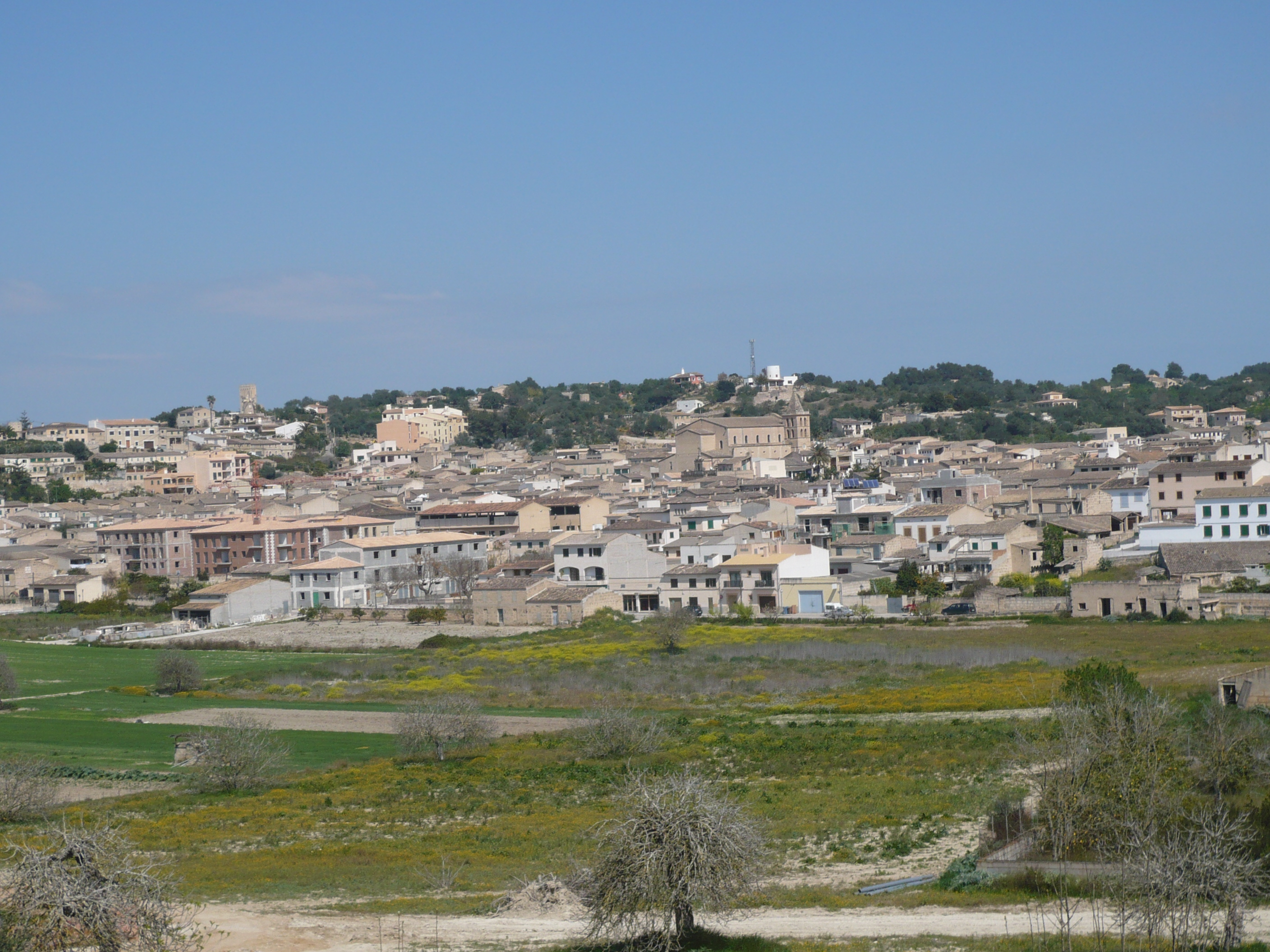

- Flag Coat of arms

- Location of Sant Joan in Mallorca

- Location in Mallorca Sant Joan (Balearic Islands) Sant Joan (Spain)
- Coordinates: 39°35′40″N 3°02′24″E
- Country: Spain
- Autonomous community: Balearic Islands
- Province: Balearic Islands
- Comarca: Pla de Mallorca
- Judicial district: Manacor

Government
  - Mayor: Richard Thompson

Area
  - Total: 38.54 km^{2} (14.88 sq mi)
- Elevation: 152 m (499 ft)

Population (2025-01-01)
  - Total: 2,336
  - Density: 60.61/km^{2} (157.0/sq mi)
- Demonym: Santjoaneros
- Time zone: UTC+1 (CET)
  - Summer (DST): UTC+2 (CEST)
- Postal code: 07240

Sant Joan (Balearic Catalan: [səɲ ʒuˈan]; English: Saint John) is a municipality on Mallorca, Spain, situated in the center of the island in the comarca of Pla de Mallorca. The town Sant Joan, formerly known as Sant Joan de Sineu, was founded in 1300. It is bordered by the municipalities of Petra, Villafranca de Bonany, Porreres, Montuïri, Lloret de Vistalegre, and Sineu.

== Sports ==
In the town there are two futsal clubs, Sant Joan C.E. and Just Just Sant Joan.

Sant Joan C.E. was founded in 2007. Currently the team plays at 1ª Regional de la Federació de Futbol de les Illes Balears from Balearic Islands. It is the most honored team of the town, winning two Balearic Futsal Cups at 2009 (Senior Squad) and 2011 (Youth Squad).
