= Maria de la Salut =

- Municipality
- Coat of arms

- Location within Mallorca

- Location in Mallorca Maria de la Salut (Balearic Islands) Maria de la Salut (Spain)
- Coordinates: 39°39′52″N 3°04′29″E
- Country: Spain
- Autonomous community: Balearic Islands
- Province: Balearic Islands
- Comarca: Pla de Mallorca

Area
  - Total: 30.49 km^{2} (11.77 sq mi)
- Elevation: 123 m (404 ft)

Population (2025-01-01)
  - Total: 2,461
  - Density: 80.71/km^{2} (209.1/sq mi)
- Time zone: UTC+1 (CET)
  - Summer (DST): UTC+2 (CEST)

Maria de la Salut (Balearic Catalan: [məˈɾi.ə ðə lə səˈlut]) is a town and municipality on the island of Mallorca, one of the Balearic Islands, Spain. It is located in the center of the island, in the district of Pla de Mallorca, and borders the municipalities of Llubí, Santa Margalida, Ariany and Sineu.

== History ==
At the time of the Christian conquest, Maria's lands included the Murūh Islamic district. In the cast, it fell to the part of the Count of Empúries.

The municipality of Maria de la Salut appeared in the nineteenth century when it segregated from Santa Margalida.

They emphasize the "possessions" of Roqueta, Deulosal and Montblanc, as well as other estates and places such as sa Bisbal, Son Gil, es Pujol, es Rafal, Son Perot, es Gassons, sa Font, Son Roig, ses Sors, es Rafal Nou, sa Torreta, Son Niell, Llampí, Son Xigala, Vall d'Aram, Ses Tarragones and Son Bacs.

== Economy ==
Traditionally it is an agricultural town where the extensive herbaceous crops and the ovine cattle ranch stand out; As well as garlic, melons, watermelons and tomatoes (which are often produced in rainfed land); And in marginal areas, the almond trees.

In the last years several companies dedicated to the construction have already proliferated, either construction materials (mainly blockades and other prefabricated ones) as public and civil works.

There have been, and still exist, craftsmen of wood and iron.

They emphasize like other habitual trades, in number those of teachers and professors.

== See also ==
List of monuments and places of interest Maria de la Salut
