= Francinaina Cirer Carbonell =

Blessed Francinaina Cirer Carbonell
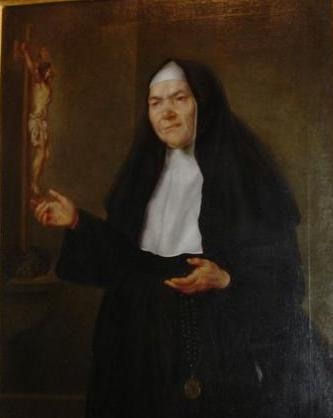
- Born: 1 June 1781; Sencelles, Mallorca, Kingdom of Spain
- Died: 27 February 1855 (aged 73); Sencelles, Mallorca, Islas Baleares, Kingdom of Spain
- Venerated in: Roman Catholic Church
- Beatified: 1 October 1989, Saint Peter's Square, Vatican City by Pope John Paul II
- Feast: 27 February

Francinaina Cirer Carbonell (1 June 1781 – 27 February 1855) was a Spanish Roman Catholic member of the Sisters of Charity of Saint Vincent de Paul of Mallorca. She later assumed the religious name Francinaina of the Sorrowful Mother of God. Although she was illiterate, she went on to found the Community of the Sisters of Charity despite this impediment. She reportedly experienced angelic visions on numerous occasions. She was beatified on 1 October 1989 a second miracle attributed to her is currently under investigation.

== Life ==
Francinaina Cirer Carbonell was born in Spain on 1 June 1781 as the last of six children to Paulo Cirer and Joan Carbonell. She grew up in a pious household and was solicitous of those who required help. Carbonell did not receive an education and as a result of this was illiterate. In 1788 she received the sacrament of confirmation and in 1791 received her first communion. In 1813, she became a member of the Brotherhood of the SS. Sacrament in her parish.

She soon wanted to enter the convent in Palma and manifested her desire to become a religious to her parents but this was something that her father was opposed to. It was not until his death in 1810 that she was able to embark on the path to religious life. It was also around this time that her mother died in 1807 and five brothers died between 1788 and 1804. Carbonell spent the next three decades in her own home in a routine of charitable acts and penance. She also taught catechism and helped the sick and the poor. Soon others sought her for advice and she was a reconciler of estranged married couples and other relationships. This earned her the moniker of the "Saint of Sansellas".

Soon she felt called to establish a sisterhood of Vincentines in her town and thus donated her time to do this with two other women. She ensured the purpose of her congregation was to continue the work that Carbonell herself did and this involved teaching catechism as well as home visitation for the sick. She took as her religious name Francinaina of the Sorrowful Mother of God at her profession on 7 December 1851. She often had visions of angels and once was reported to have levitated from the ground in an ecstatic state. She once had a vision of angels with violins. Carbonell died in 1855 of a stroke. The number of people who attended her funeral was immense.

== Beatification ==
The beatification process commenced in Mallorca on 22 December 1903 in a process that concluded on 2 September 1926 and granted her the title Servant of God. This process opened despite the fact that the formal introduction of the cause was not until 4 December 1940 under Pope Pius XII. The final local process took place again in Mallorca from 19 August 1942 until 1944. Both of these processes were granted the formal decree of ratification from the Congregation of Rites in 1951.

On 21 March 1985 she was declared to be venerable after Pope John Paul II recognized that she had lived a model Christian life of heroic virtue.

The miracle required for beatification was investigated in a local diocesan tribunal. The process was ratified in 1986 and the pope approved it on 28 November 1988. He beatified her on 1 October 1989.

The second miracle that is required for sainthood was also investigated in a local diocesan tribunal and was ratified on 19 June 2006. The Medical Board that advises the Congregation for the Causes of Saints approved the healing as a miracle on 18 June 2009.
