= Vilafranca de Bonany =

- Municipality
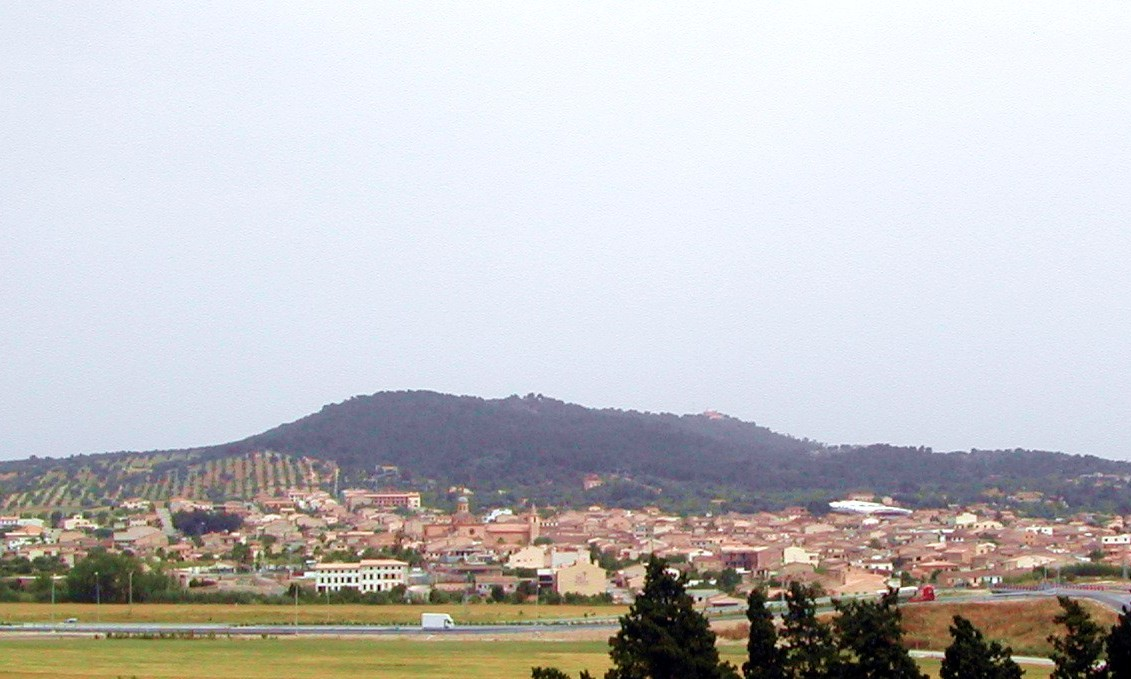
- The village in 2007

- Flag Coat of arms

- Location within Mallorca

- Location in Mallorca Vilafranca de Bonany (Balearic Islands) Vilafranca de Bonany (Spain)
- Coordinates: 39°34′12″N 3°05′17″E
- Country: Spain
- Autonomous community: Balearic Islands
- Province: Balearic Islands
- Comarca: Pla de Mallorca

Area
  - Total: 23.96 km^{2} (9.25 sq mi)

Population (2025-01-01)
  - Total: 3,929
  - Density: 164.0/km^{2} (424.7/sq mi)
- Time zone: UTC+1 (CET)
  - Summer (DST): UTC+2 (CEST)

Vilafranca de Bonany (Balearic Catalan: [viləˈfɾaŋkə ðə bonˈaɲ]) is a municipality in the district of Pla de Mallorca on Mallorca, one of the Balearic Islands in Spain. It is an agricultural town, known for its market stalls along the highway selling spices, fruits, and vegetables as well as tiny doughnuts called bunyols in Catalan and buñuelos in Spanish, and also known for the historic Santa Barbara Church built in the 1730s.

In the northeast outskirts of the town is a 17th-century monastery called Ermita de Bonany, or Hermitage of Bonany. It was built in thanks for a good harvest; the name "Bonany" literally means "good year".

This town borders Felanitx, Porreres, Sant Joan, Petra and Manacor.

== See also ==
- List of municipalities in Balearic Islands
