= Sant Joan C.E. =

Sant Joan
- Full name: Sant Joan Club Esportiu
- Nickname: El Sant Joan / El CE
- Founded: 2007
- Ground: Pavelló Municipal Son Juny; Sant Joan, Illes Balears
- Capacity: 250
- Chairman: (Balearic Islands) Joan Rigo
- Manager: (Balearic Islands) Joan Rigo
- League: 1ª Regional – FFIB
- 2012–13: 1ª Regional – FFIB, 6th
- Website: http://santjoance.blogspot.com
Home colours	Away colours

The Sant Joan Club Esportiu is a futsal club from the town of Sant Joan on Balearic Islands (Spain) founded at 2007. Currently the team plays at 1ª Regional de la Federació de Futbol de les Illes Balears from Balearic Islands. Is the most honored team of the town, winning two Balearic Futsal Cups at 2009 (Senior Squad) and 2011(Youth Squad).

== History ==
=== Starting 2007-2009 ===
The club was founded on the town of Sant Joan at 2007. First years were a chaotic and confused start and sometimes the club was near to the dismiss.

=== Rising 2009-2013 ===
On the Season 2009-2010 the club won the Balearic Futsal Cup (2009) 1st Regional League Group B, that was the first title for the club, and the town. Also the club achieved 4th place in the Balearic Regional League, meaning the best result in its history.

For the season 2010-2011 the Youth Squad were founded, but both teams had a very irregular and non-productive season.

For the season 2011-2012 the Cadet Squad were founded, and it was the fifth for the Senior Squad, Joan Rigo became the chairman. It finished the season on 6th place on the Group-B of First Regional League (in Spanish: Primera Regional).

The Youth Squad won the Balearic Youth Cup (2011) Group C on the season starting. At end of the season the team reaches the semifinals on the Youth Futsal Cup on Balearic Islands, and the semifinals of the Balearic Federation Cup. The Team finished the League on the 3rd position.

This season was the first for the Cadet Squad, which reached the semifinals of the Balearic Federation Cup and finished the League on the 6th position.

At the finish of the Season 2012-2013, the club starts an economic and social crisis.

=== Rejuvenation 2013- ===
Due to an economic and social crisis, the club disbanded Youth and Cadet Squads. Most of historic players of the club retired from playing and had been incorporated to the staff.

== Ground ==
The Sant Joan Club Esportiu plays their matches on the Pavelló Municipal Son Juny in the Town of Sant Joan since its foundation. The Stadium is allowed for 250 spectators and has bar service.

== Honours ==
- 1 Balearic Futsal Cup (2009) 1st Regional League Group B
- 1 Balearic Youth Cup (2011) Group C
