= Malanquilla =

Coordinates: 41°34′N 1°52′W

- municipality
- Flag Coat of arms
- Interactive map of Malanquilla
- Country: Spain
- Autonomous community: Aragon
- Province: Zaragoza

Area
  - Total: 36 km^{2} (14 sq mi)

Population (2025-01-01)
  - Total: 71
  - Density: 2.0/km^{2} (5.1/sq mi)
- Time zone: UTC+1 (CET)
  - Summer (DST): UTC+2 (CEST)

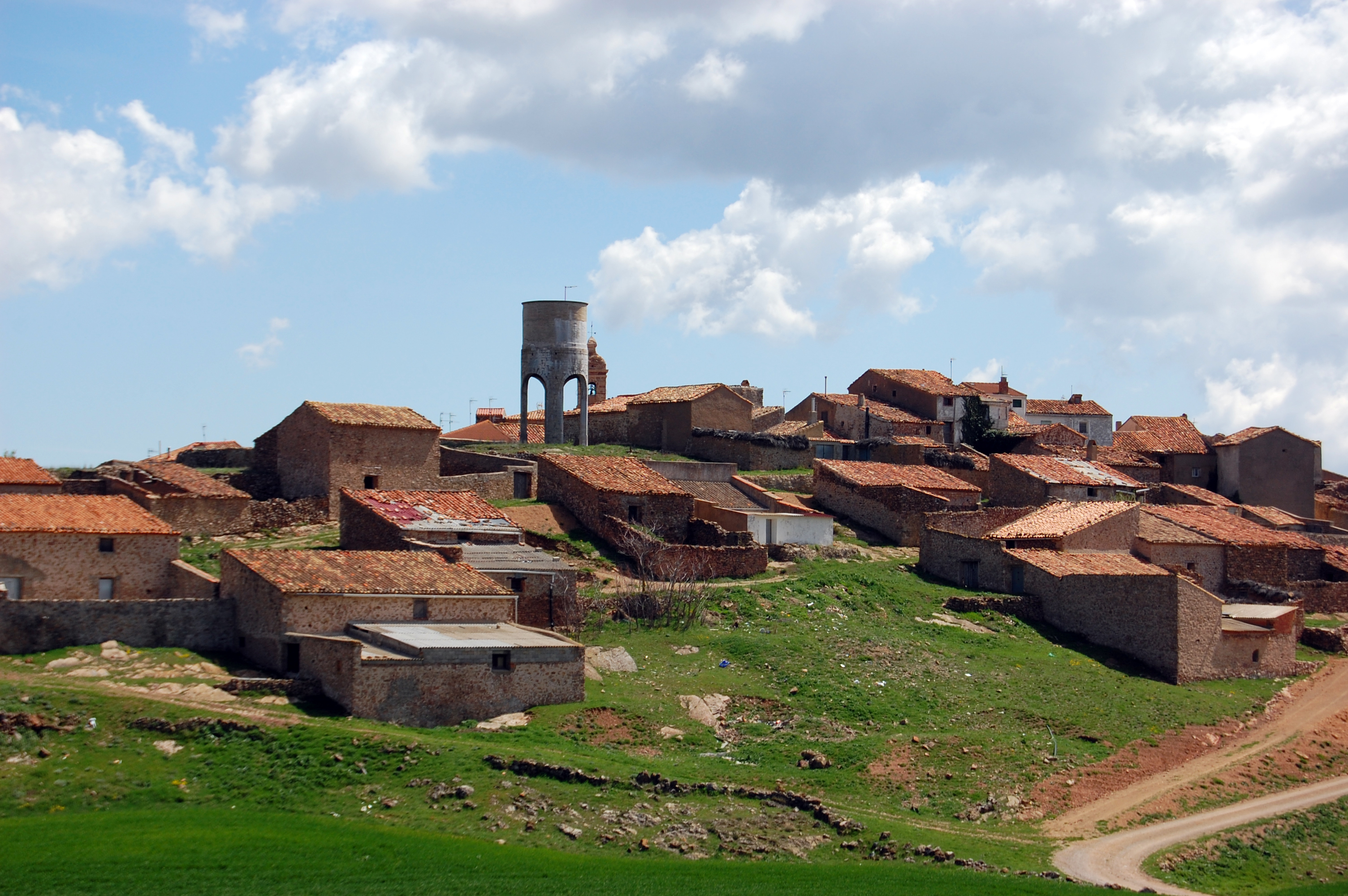
View of Malanquilla

Malanquilla is a municipality in the province of Zaragoza, Aragon, Spain. According to the 2004 census (INE), the municipality has a population of 132 inhabitants.

The town is located at the western end of the Sierra de la Virgen, between this range and the Moncayo Massif.

== See also ==
- List of municipalities in Zaragoza
