= Ariany, Spain =

Ariany Ariañy
- Municipality and town
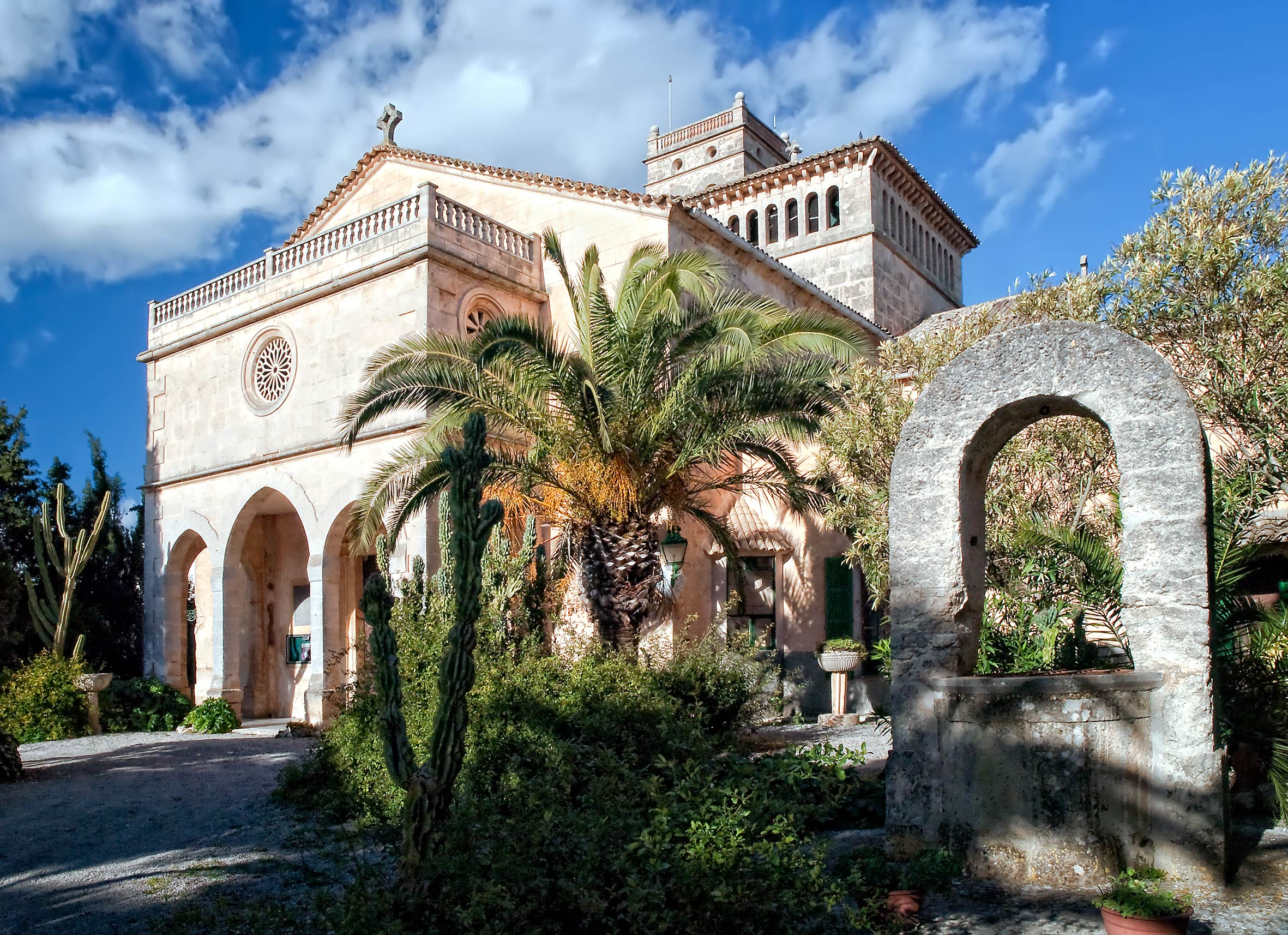
- Parish Church of Nuestra Señora de Atocha

- Coat of arms

- Municipal location

- Location of the town in Mallorca Ariany (Balearic Islands) Ariany (Spain)
- Coordinates: 39°38′58″N 3°6′39″E
- Country: Spain
- Autonomous Community: Balearic Islands
- Province: Balearic Islands
- Island: Mallorca
- Comarca: Pla de Mallorca

Government
  - Mayor (2007–): Joan Ribot Mayol

Area
  - Total: 8.93 sq mi (23.14 km^{2})
- Elevation: 407 ft (124 m)

Population (2025-01-01)
  - Total: 1,072
  - Density: 120.0/sq mi (46.33/km^{2})
- Time zone: UTC+1 (CET)
  - Summer (DST): UTC+2 (CEST)
- Website: www.ajariany.net

Ariany (Balearic Catalan: [əɾiˈaɲ]) is a municipality on Mallorca, one of the Balearic Islands, Spain. It has an area of 22.72 km² with 839 inhabitants in 2008, 763 of which lived in the main town. In 2006, the foreign population of the municipality was 10.4% (80 people).

Situated in the Plain of Mallorca (Pla de Mallorca) it is 50km from Palma, the island Capital, 6km from Petra and 19km from Manacor.

== History ==
Archeological findings show that the surrounding villages were present in prehistoric times. James I of Aragon first referred to the settlement with its current name. From the sixteenth century it was subject to the Cotoner family, owners of the land in Ariany. The current population center was developed around the manor house of the Auberg's, named S'Auberg i El Camí de Sa Marquesa. Other main buildings today include the Parish Church of Nostra Senyora d'Atotxa (built in 1570) and Ca ses Monges, the convent of Franciscan nuns. The village is surrounded by nature, and has no highway running through it.

== See also ==
- List of municipalities in Balearic Islands
