= Santa Eugènia, Mallorca =

Santa Eugènia
- Municipality
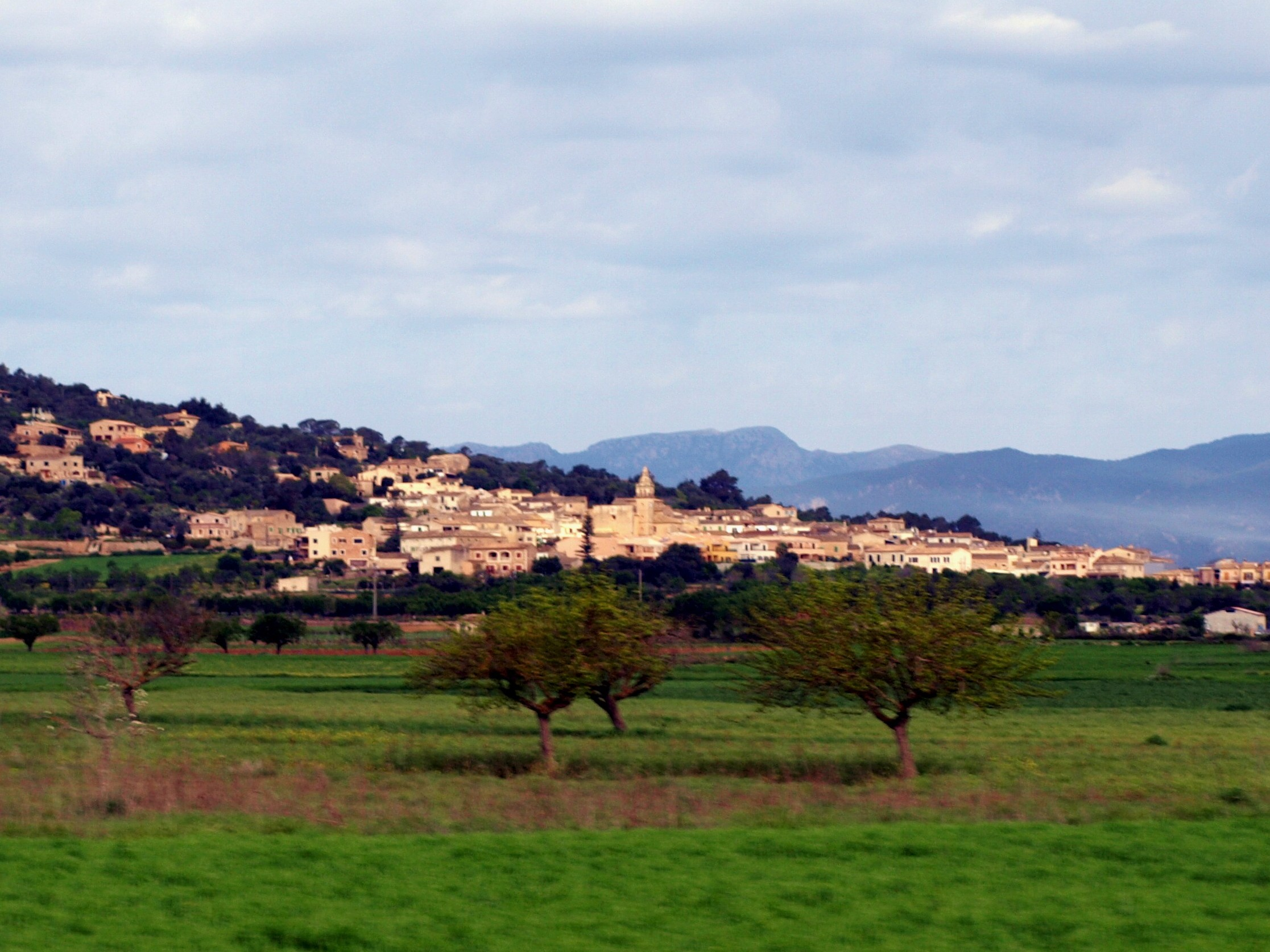

- Flag Coat of arms

- Map of Santa Eugènia in Mallorca

- Location in Mallorca Santa Eugènia (Balearic Islands) Santa Eugènia (Spain)
- Coordinates: 39°37′25″N 2°50′21″E
- Country: Spain
- Autonomous community: Balearic Islands
- Province: Balearic Islands
- Comarca: Pla de Mallorca
- Judicial district: Palma de Mallorca

Government
  - Mayor: Guillem Crespí Sastre

Area
  - Total: 20.25 km^{2} (7.82 sq mi)
- Elevation: 149 m (489 ft)

Population (2025-01-01)
  - Total: 1,902
  - Density: 93.93/km^{2} (243.3/sq mi)
- Demonym: Taujà
- Time zone: UTC+1 (CET)
  - Summer (DST): UTC+2 (CEST)
- Postal code: 07142
- Website: Official website

Santa Eugènia (Balearic Catalan: [sənt‿əwˈʒɛniə], also [sənt‿əwˈʒɛni]) is a municipality in the comarca of Pla de Mallorca on Mallorca, one of the Balearic Islands, Spain. It is named after Saint Eugenia of Rome.

== History ==
In prehistoric times, the area was settled by the Talaiotic Culture.

After the Moorish conquest of Iberia, it was ruled by the Berber Zenata people, until it was captured by King James I of Aragon in 1229.
