= Costitx =

- Municipality
- Coat of arms

- Location within Mallorca

- Location in Mallorca Costitx (Balearic Islands) Costitx (Spain)
- Coordinates: 39°39′N 2°57′E
- Country: Spain
- Autonomous community: Balearic Islands
- Province: Balearic Islands
- Comarca: Pla de Mallorca

Government
  - Mayor: Antoni Salas (El Pi)

Area
  - Total: 15.37 km^{2} (5.93 sq mi)

Population (2024)
  - Total: 1,490
  - Density: 96.9/km^{2} (251/sq mi)
- Time zone: UTC+1 (CET)
  - Summer (DST): UTC+2 (CEST)
- Website: www.ajcostitx.net/es

Costitx (Balearic Catalan: [kosˈtitʃ]) is a municipality on Mallorca, one of the Balearic Islands, Spain.

The Astronomical Observatory of Mallorca is situated just south of Costitx.

== See also ==
- List of municipalities in Balearic Islands
