= Muro, Mallorca =

Muro
- Municipality
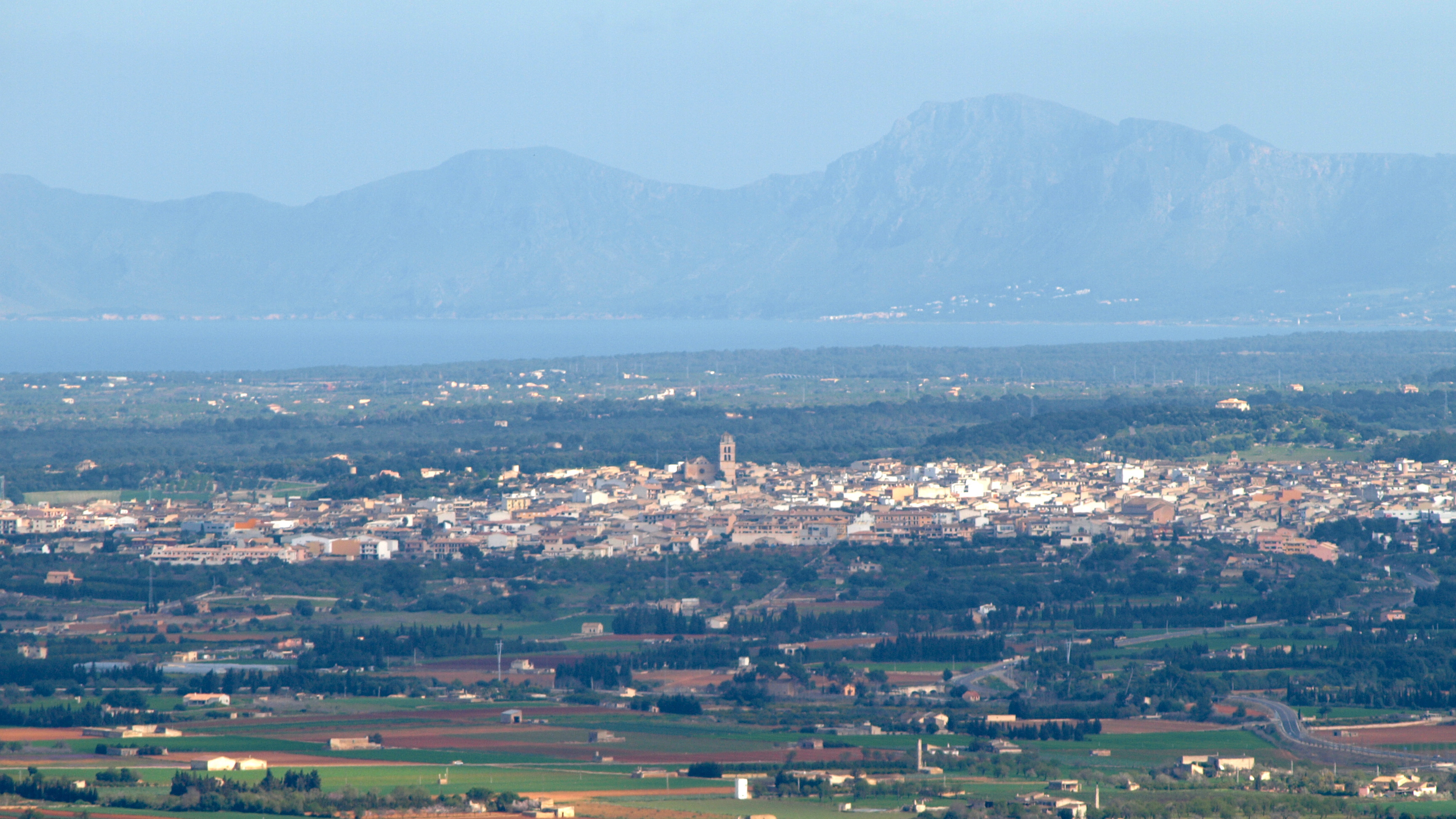
- View of Muro.

- Coat of arms

- Location within Mallorca

- Location in Majorca Muro (Balearic Islands) Muro (Spain)
- Coordinates: 39.734°N 3.055°E
- Country: Spain
- Autonomous Community: Balearic Islands
- Province: Balearic Islands
- Island: Mallorca
- Comarca: Pla de Mallorca

Government
  - Mayor: Martí Fornés (2011–)

Area
  - Total: 58.61 km^{2} (22.63 sq mi)
- Elevation: 83 m (272 ft)

Population (2024)
  - Total: 8,136
  - Density: 138.8/km^{2} (359.5/sq mi)
- Time zone: UTC+1 (CET)
  - Summer (DST): UTC+2 (CEST)
- Postal Code: 07440
- Website: www.ajmuro.net

Muro (Balearic Catalan: [ˈmuɾo]) is a small municipality on Mallorca, the largest of the Balearic Islands, which are part of Spain. It is located in the north-east of the island. With a history stretching back to prehistoric times, Muro has been shaped by various cultures, including Roman and Muslim influences, before becoming part of the Kingdom of Majorca after the Catalan Conquest in the 13th century. Historically an agricultural hub, the town is known for its production of oranges, lemons, olives, and potatoes, though its agricultural sector faces modern challenges. As of 2024, Muro had a population of 8,136 residents and experiences a significant increase in tourism, particularly during the summer months.

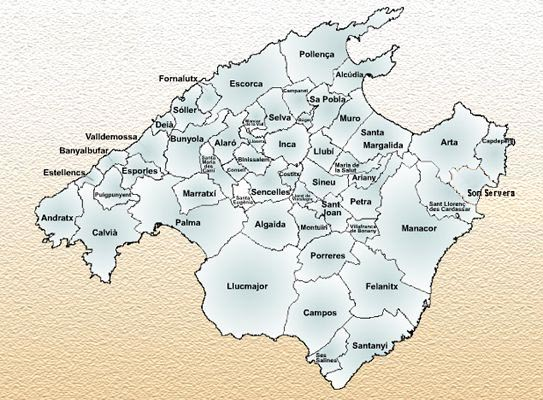
Muro is located in the northeast of Mallorca.

== History ==
The history of Muro stretches back to prehistoric times, as evidenced by archaeological remains. During the Roman Empire period, the area formed part of the urban center of Pollentia and served as a hub for trade and agriculture. Under Muslim rule, Muro developed into a productive agricultural and livestock-based settlement. The town's name is believed to have originated from the Arabic term Muruh, possibly meaning "wall" or "boundary."

A major turning point came in the 13th century with the Catalan Conquest of Majorca led by King James I of Aragon, after which Muro became part of the Kingdom of Majorca. Christian settlers gradually replaced the Muslim population, and the town began to take on the urban layout still recognizable today. The oldest part of Muro, known as El Comtat, formed around the estates of Catalan lords, and the town expanded steadily over the centuries. During the Renaissance, Muro experienced economic and cultural growth, marked by the construction of notable churches and manor houses. Despite political changes and periods of unrest over time, Muro has retained much of its traditional identity and architectural heritage.

== Agriculture ==
Muro and the surrounding area are famous for growing oranges, lemons, olives and potatoes.

Orange cultivation remains a traditional and significant part of agriculture in Muro, but local growers are struggling with rising production costs and stagnant market prices. Local farmers report that maintaining healthy crops requires constant phytosanitary treatments, particularly to combat the Mediterranean fruit fly, a pest that causes severe fruit damage. Despite investing hundreds of euros in treatments, wholesale prices have remained around €0.30 per kilo, barely enough to cover expenses. Some farmers have turned to more ecological methods such as insect traps, while others are replacing orange trees with alternative crops like avocados. Additional challenges include competition from foreign imports, especially from South Africa and Egypt, which are produced under more lenient regulations, and the rising cost of fertilizers and labor.

Farmers in Muro and Sa Pobla produce over 1,600 tons of potatoes every year, generating 100 direct jobs and 150 indirect jobs. This production is intended for export and the domestic market with a value of nearly 20 million euros.

== Demographics ==
According to an evaluation by the Spanish National Statistics Institute, Muro had a population of 8,136 in 2024, reflecting a steady growth from the 7,547 residents recorded in the 2021 official Spanish census. This represents a population average annual increase of approximately 2.5% over the three-year period. The municipality covers an area of 58.61 km², resulting in a population density of around 138.8 inhabitants per square kilometre.

The population structure of Muro is fairly balanced in terms of gender, with men accounting for 4,112 individuals (50.5%) and women slightly fewer at 4,024 (49.5%). The age distribution shows a predominantly working-age population, with 60.9% of residents between 18 and 64 years old. Children under 18 make up 21.3% of the population, while seniors aged 65 and over represent 17.8%.

Muro is largely composed of Spanish nationals, who make up 78.9% of the population. However, it is also home to a diverse array of international residents. Individuals from Africa represent the largest foreign group at 9.6%, followed by residents from the European Union (5.1%) and the Americas (5.1%). Smaller communities also come from other parts of Europe (0.9%) and Asia and Oceania (0.4%). In terms of country of birth, 75.8% of Muro's population was born in Spain. Among foreign-born residents, the largest groups are from Africa (9.5%) and the Americas (8.9%), followed by the European Union (4.3%), other parts of Europe (1%), and Asia and Oceania (0.4%).

== Administration and local government ==
The municipal government of Muro is led by Martí Fornés of the local political group Convergència Democràtica Murera (CDM), who was re-elected mayor following the municipal elections in 2015. His appointment was secured through a coalition agreement with the Partido Popular (PP) and Proposta per les Illes (El PI) parties, with CDM holding five seats on the town council, and PP and El PI each contributing one.

== Tourism ==
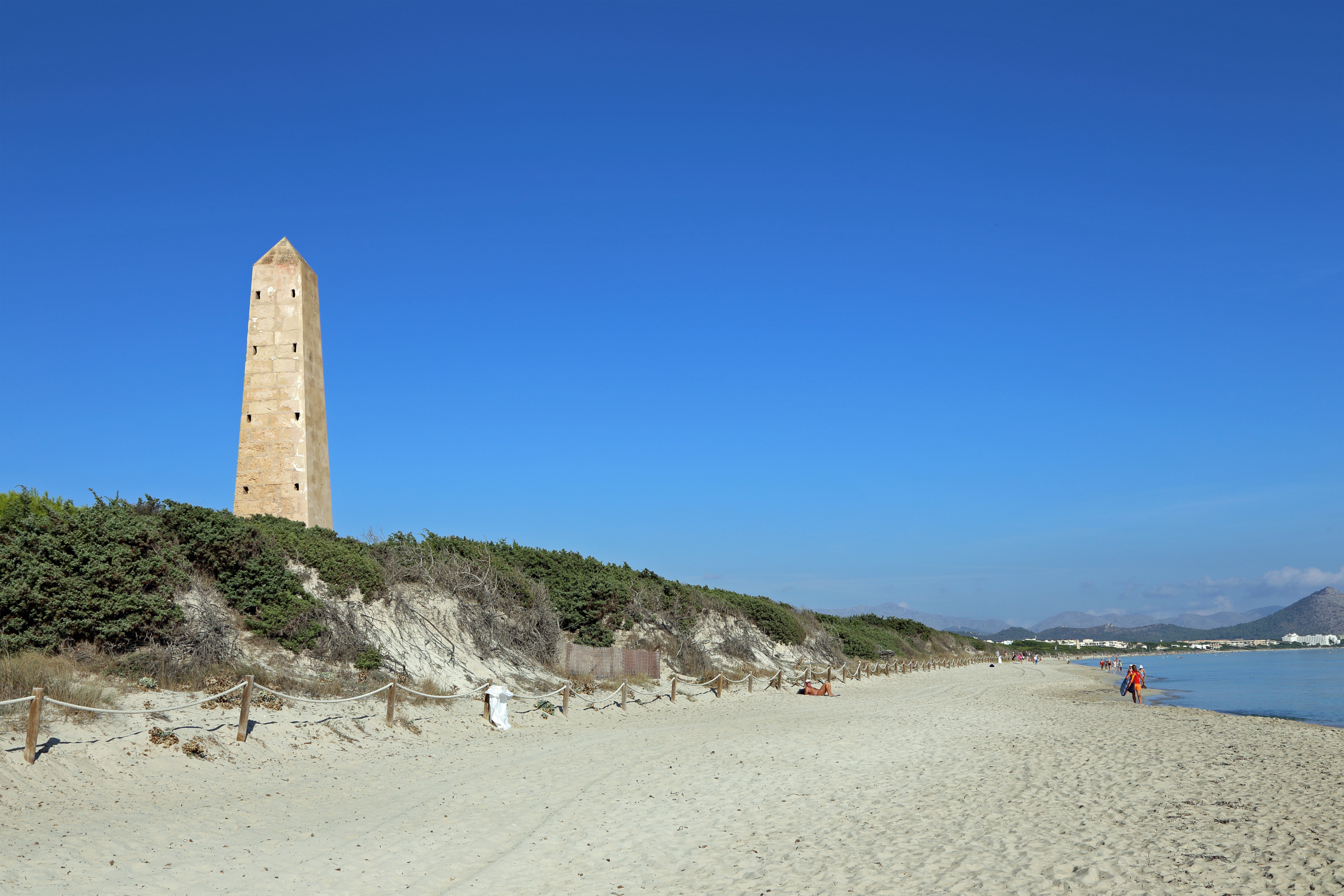
The Platja de Muro (beach)

Muro, like many municipalities in Mallorca, experiences a significant influx of tourists during the summer months, with August being a particularly striking example. According to a survey conducted in August 2024 by the Spanish National Statistics Institute that tracked foreign tourist numbers via phone data, Muro experienced six times as many foreign tourists as residents.

== International relations ==
=== Twin towns ===
Since April 2008, Muro has been officially twinned with Dębica, a town in southeastern Poland, as part of the European cooperation initiative "Europa Miast" (translated as "Europe of Cities"). The partnership agreement was signed in Muro's town hall, marking the culmination of several months of dialogue and cultural exchange efforts initiated by Dębica to establish a sister city in Spain.
