= Pla de Mallorca =

Coordinates: 39°36′17″N 3°02′53″E

Municipalities of the Pla de Mallorca

Pla de Mallorca (Catalan pronunciation: [ˈpla ðə məˈʎɔɾkə], Catalan for "plain of Mallorca") is a comarca (county) in the middle of the Mallorca island, Balearic Islands, Spain.

It includes the following municipalities:

- Algaida
- Ariany
- Costitx
- Lloret de Vistalegre
- Llubí
- Maria de la Salut
- Montuïri
- Muro
- Petra
- Porreres
- Sant Joan
- Santa Eugènia
- Sencelles
- Sineu
- Vilafranca de Bonany
