= Algaida =

- Municipality and town
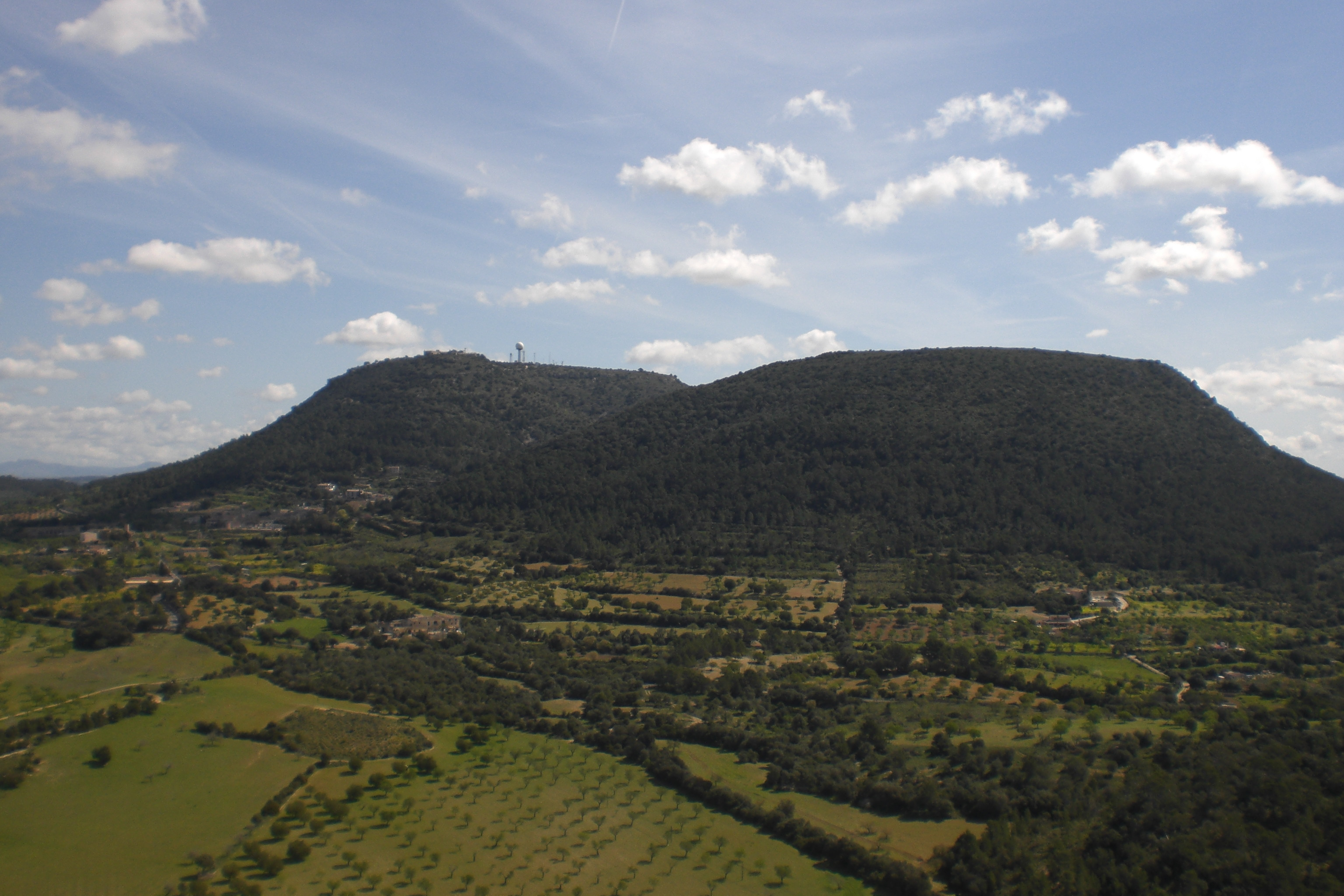

- Coat of arms

- Map of Algaida in Mallorca

- Location in Mallorca Algaida (Balearic Islands) Algaida (Spain)
- Coordinates: 39°33′30″N 2°53′30″E
- Country: Spain
- Autonomous Community: Balearic Islands
- Province: Balearic Islands
- Island: Mallorca
- Comarca: Pla de Mallorca

Government
  - Mayor: Margalida Fullana Arrom

Area
  - Total: 89.78 km^{2} (34.66 sq mi)

Population (2025-01-01)
  - Total: 6,357
  - Density: 70.81/km^{2} (183.4/sq mi)
- Demonym: Algaidins
- Time zone: UTC+1 (CET)
  - Summer (DST): UTC+2 (CEST)
- Postal code: 07210

Algaida (Balearic Catalan: [əlˈɣajðə], also [əlˈɣajɾə]) is a municipality on the Spanish Balearic island of Mallorca. It has an area of 89.70 km^{2} with 4,528 inhabitants (as of 2005).

== Geography ==
The municipality of Algaida is located in the south-east of the island of Mallorca, 22 km along the main highway from Palma to Manacor. The municipality encompasses six small mountains, the highest and most famous of which is Puig de Randa at 543 m. Rainfall can occur all year round. The driest month is July with an average rainfall of 12.5 L/m^{2}. The heaviest rainfall in a single 24-hour period was on 17 September 1943 at 97 L/m^{2}.

== History ==
The name Algaida stems from the Arabic word al-gaida (meaning "the Base"). The municipality comprises Algaida, Pina and Randa.

Algaida was first recorded in the year 1232. The most well-known of these communities is Randa, which contains the mesa Puig de Randa, on which there are located three secluded monasteries.

== Demographics ==
The population spread is a follows. Figures are accurate as of 1 January 2005 and do not include isolated communities (and thus do not comprise the total number of inhabitants of Algaida).

- Algaida (2,423 inhabitants)
- Pina (391 inhabitants)
- Randa (62 inhabitants)

== Main sights ==
Sanctuaries in the Puig de Randa include, on a lower level, the Santuario de Nuestra Señora de Gracia, a hermitage from the 15th century, built like a swallow's nest on a promontory. On the second level stands the Santuario de Sant Honorat from the 14th century. Finally, at the top of the mountain stands the Santuario Nuestra Señora de Cura, which since 1275 has been the Franciscan hermitage of Ramon Llull, Mallorca's greatest religious philosopher and scholar, born to Catalan parents in 1232 in Palma. Puig de Randa also houses the Ramon Llull Museum and a school.

Points of interest in Algaida town include Punxuat, Albenya, the pilgrimage chapel of Mare de Déu de la Pau de Catellitx and several windmills. The town also contains Gordiola, the oldest glass blower's in Mallorca, located just outside Algaida in the direction of Palma. In the factory of the Gordiola family, one can observe the glass-blowers making various pieces of art.

Sights in Randa include the parish church of the Immaculada and Ramon Llull, the cross of Randa, the cross of Sant Honorat, the Randa springs, the Sanctuary of Mare de Déu de Cura and the panoramic views from the Randa mesa.

Pina is home to the parish church of Sants Cosme i Damià, the convent and a well. On the main road to Manacor there stands a promotional black bull of the Andalusian sherry-distiller Osborne, the only one on Mallorca. The bull, perceived by advocates of Mallorcan independence as a symbol of foreign dominance, has sustained several attacks and each time been rebuilt. The bull is now protected throughout Spain as a "National Cultural Icon".

== See also ==
- List of municipalities in Balearic Islands
