= Llubí =

- Municipality
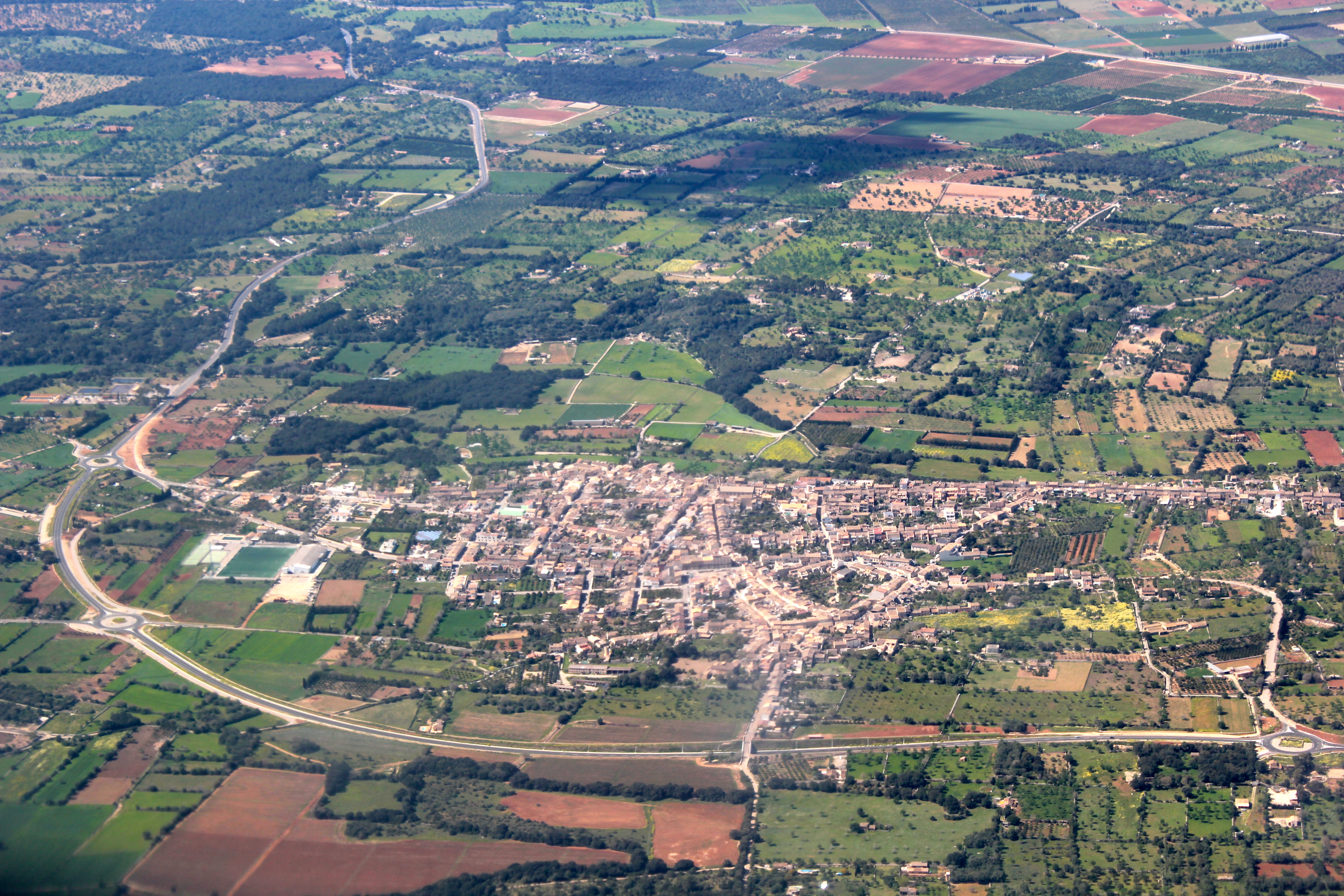
- Aerial view of Llubí

- Flag Coat of arms

- Location within Mallorca

- Location in Mallorca Llubí (Balearic Islands) Llubí (Spain)
- Coordinates: 39°42′N 3°00′E
- Country: Spain
- Autonomous community: Balearic Islands
- Province: Balearic Islands
- Comarca: Pla de Mallorca

Area
  - Total: 34.92 km^{2} (13.48 sq mi)

Population (2025-01-01)
  - Total: 2,589
  - Density: 74.14/km^{2} (192.0/sq mi)
- Time zone: UTC+1 (CET)
  - Summer (DST): UTC+2 (CEST)

Llubí (Balearic Catalan: [ʎuˈbi]) is a municipality on Mallorca, one of the Balearic Islands, Spain. It has population of 1,800 inhabitants.

It is located approximately 28 mi (45 km) from the capital city Palma de Mallorca.

Llubí is mostly known for its cultivation of capers and traditional Mallorcan architecture.
