= Montuïri =

- Municipality
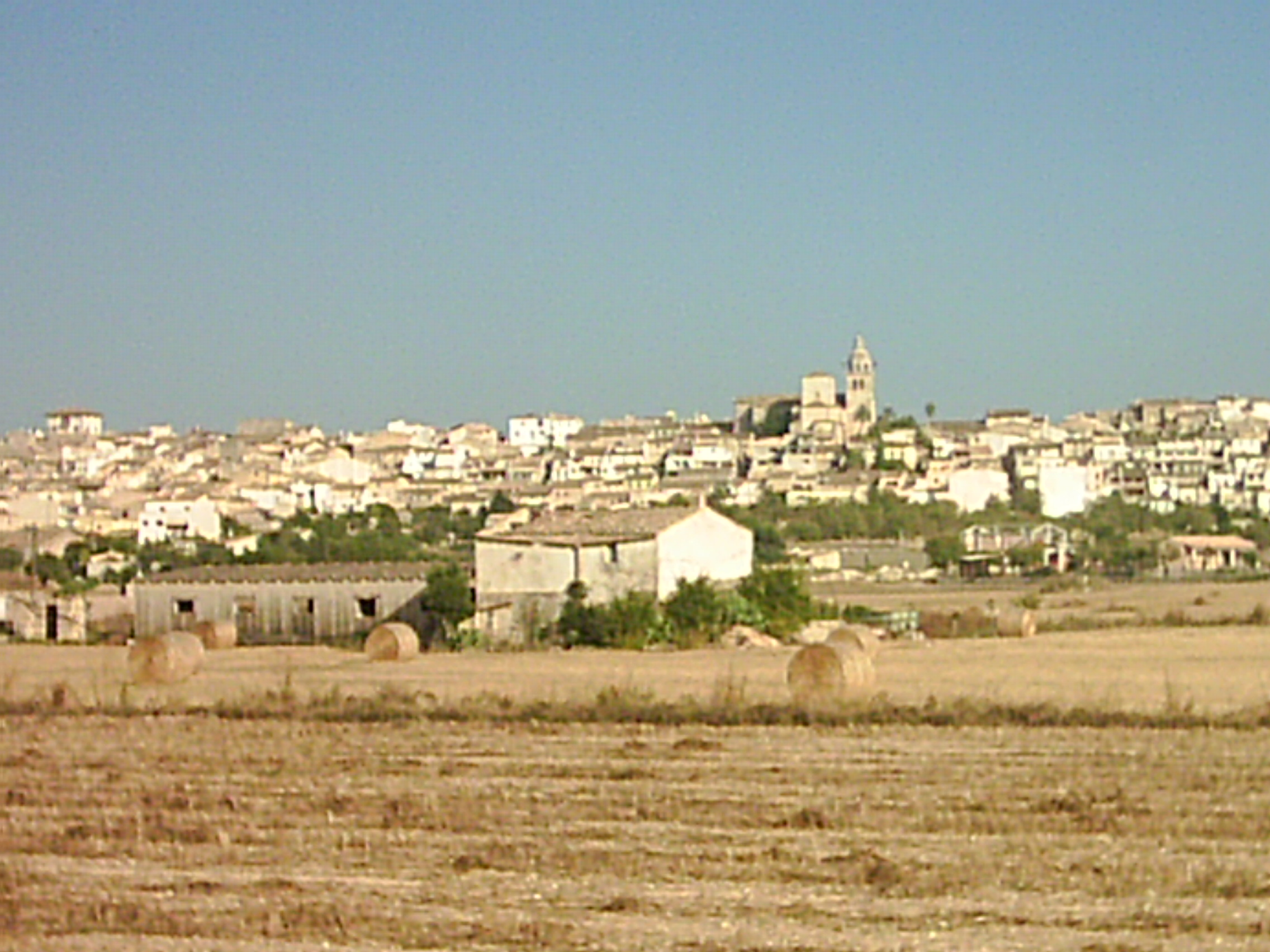
- View from the north

- Flag Coat of arms

- Location within Mallorca

- Location in Mallorca Montuïri (Balearic Islands) Montuïri (Spain)
- Coordinates: 39°34′12″N 2°59′03″E
- Country: Spain
- Autonomous community: Balearic Islands
- Province: Balearic Islands
- Comarca: Pla de Mallorca

Population (2025-01-01)
  - Total: 3,289
- Time zone: UTC+1 (CET)
  - Summer (DST): UTC+2 (CEST)

Montuïri (Balearic Catalan: [montuˈiɾi], locally [muntuˈiɾi]) is municipality in central Mallorca, one of the Balearic Islands, Spain. It is a small town built on a hill. Cyclist Gabriel Mas was born here. It is the birthplace of Macià Manera, ex-member of Terra Lliure imprisoned during the late 1980s and early 1990s.

== Gallery ==
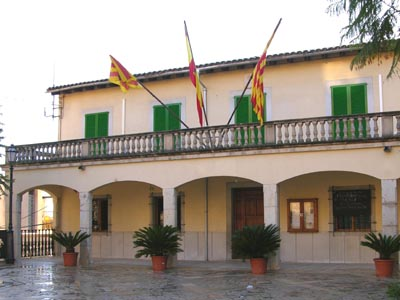
Town hall

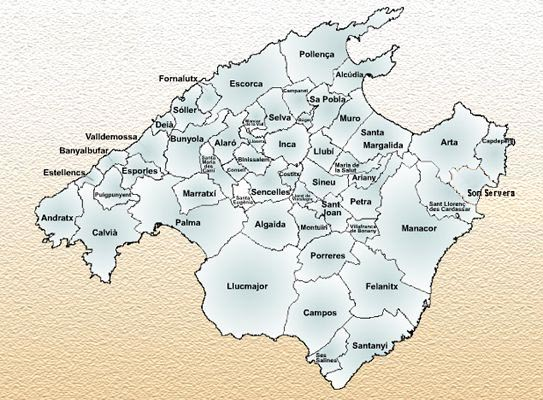
