= Petra, Spain =

Petra
- Municipality and town
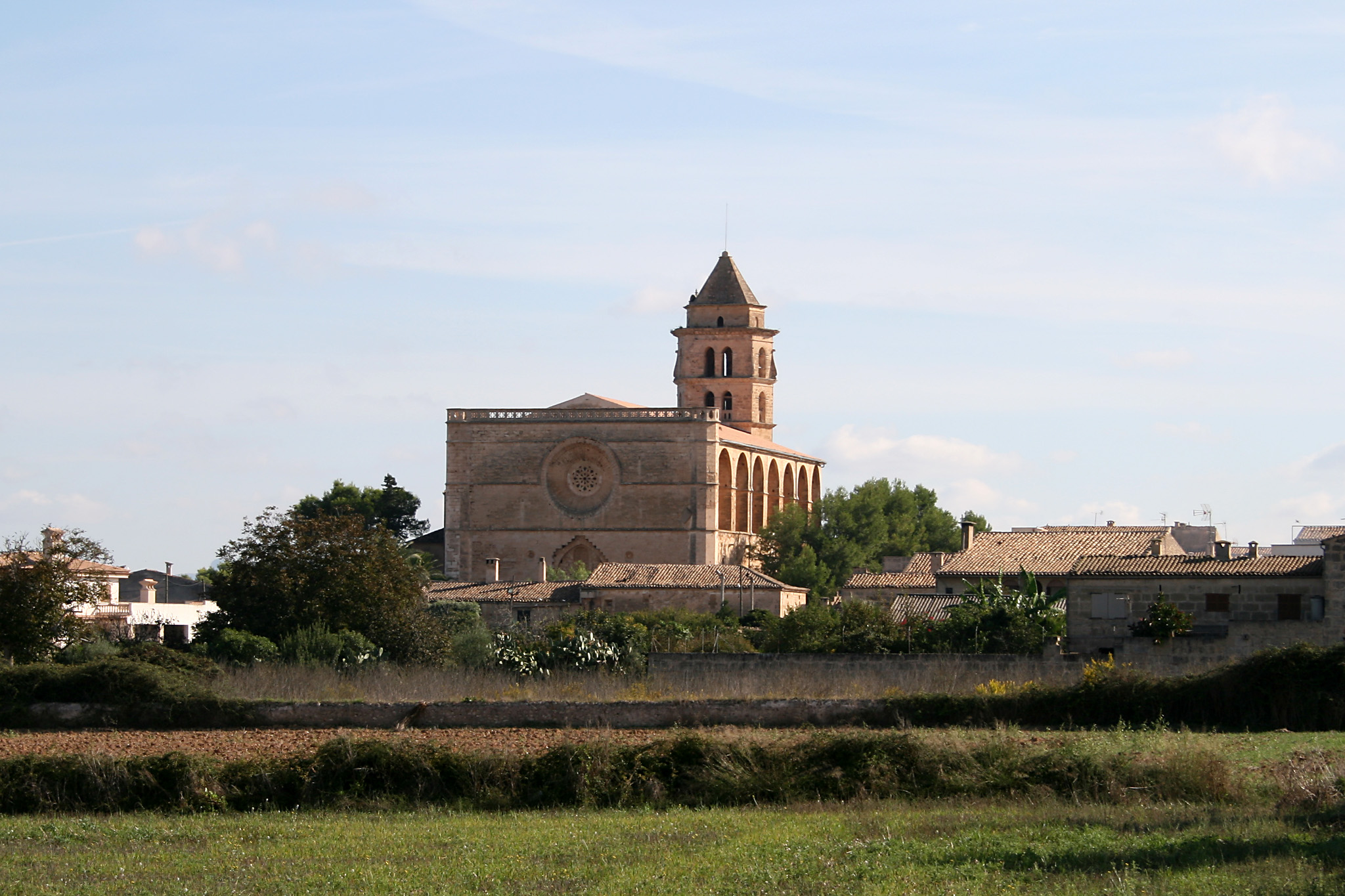
- Convento de San Bernardí, Petra

- Coat of arms

- Municipal location

- Location in Spain
- Coordinates: 39°36′49.28″N 3°6′46.78″E
- Country: Spain
- Autonomous community: Balearic Islands
- Province: Balearic Islands
- Island: Mallorca
- Comarca: Pla de Mallorca
- Judicial district: Manacor

Government
  - Major: Caterina Mas Bennàssar (2011) (PSM)

Area
  - Total: 70.13 km^{2} (27.08 sq mi)
- Elevation: 111 m (364 ft)

Population (2025-01-01)
  - Total: 3,231
  - Density: 46.07/km^{2} (119.3/sq mi)
- Demonym(s): Petrer, Petrera (Catalan)
- Time zone: UTC+1 (CET)
  - Summer (DST): UTC+2 (CEST)
- Postal code: 07520
- Website: Official website

Petra (Balearic Catalan: [ˈpetɾə]) is a town and municipality on the Mediterranean island of Mallorca, in the Spanish autonomous community of the Balearic Islands. "Petra" means "rock" in Latin.

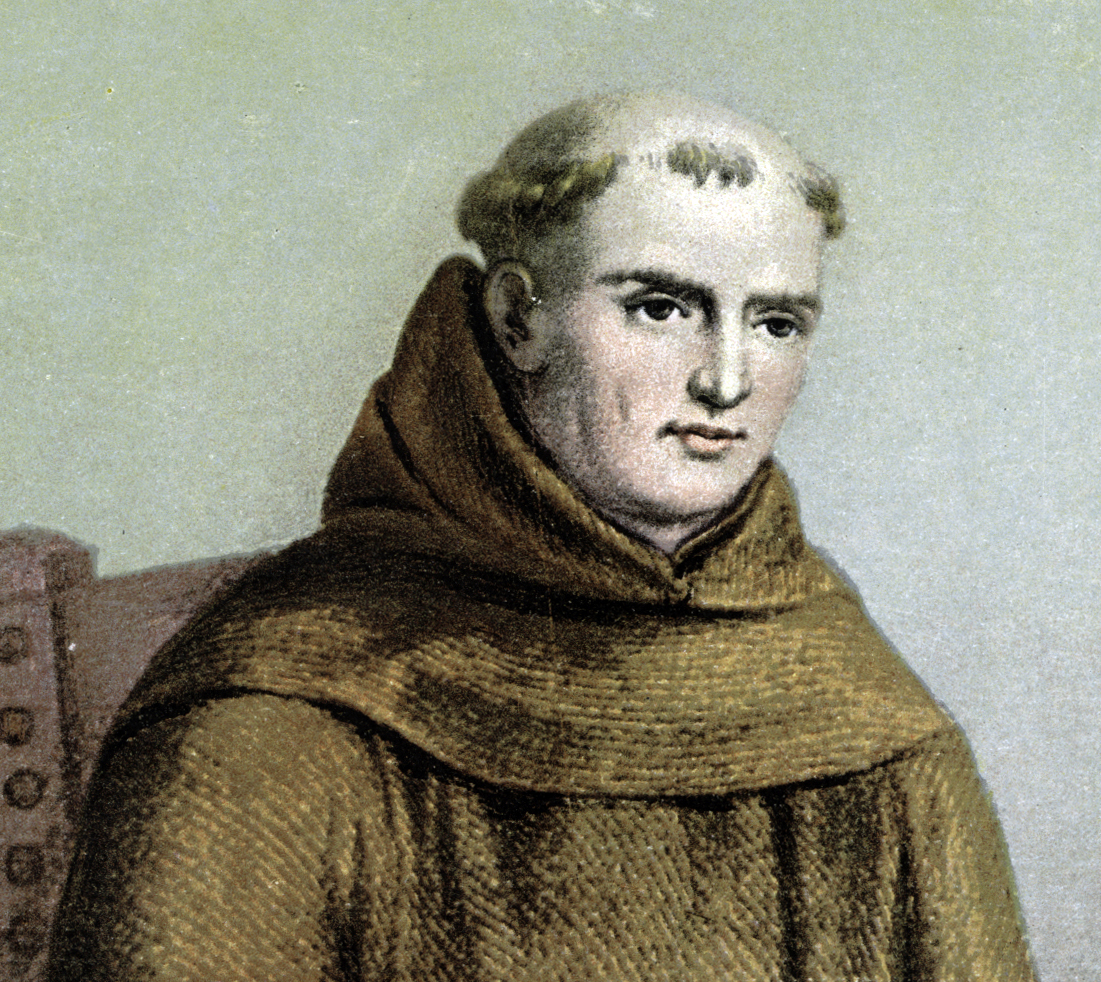
Fr Junípero Serra

Petra is the birthplace of St. Junípero Serra (1713-1784), a Franciscan friar who founded the first nine of 21 Spanish missions in California from San Diego to San Francisco.

== Notable people ==
- Pere Riutort Mestre (1935–2021), priest, pedagogue, philologue and liturgist
