= Sineu =

- Municipality
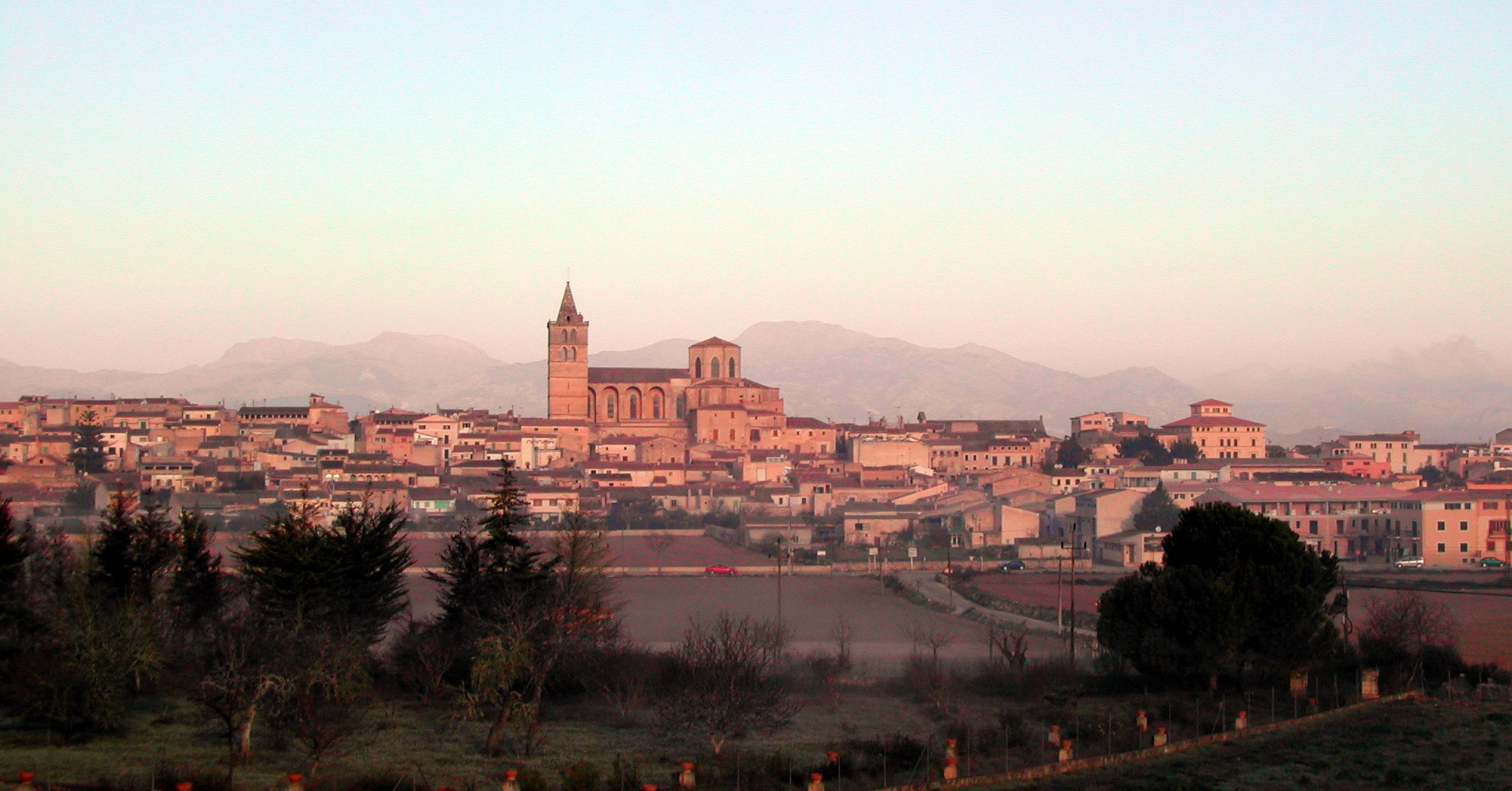
- A general view of Sineu

- Flag Coat of arms

- Location within Mallorca

- Location in Mallorca Sineu (Balearic Islands) Sineu (Spain)
- Coordinates: 39°39′N 3°00′E
- Country: Spain
- Autonomous community: Balearic Islands
- Province: Balearic Islands
- Comarca: Pla de Mallorca

Area
  - Total: 47.74 km^{2} (18.43 sq mi)

Population (2025-01-01)
  - Total: 4,537
  - Density: 95.04/km^{2} (246.1/sq mi)
- Time zone: UTC+1 (CET)
  - Summer (DST): UTC+2 (CEST)

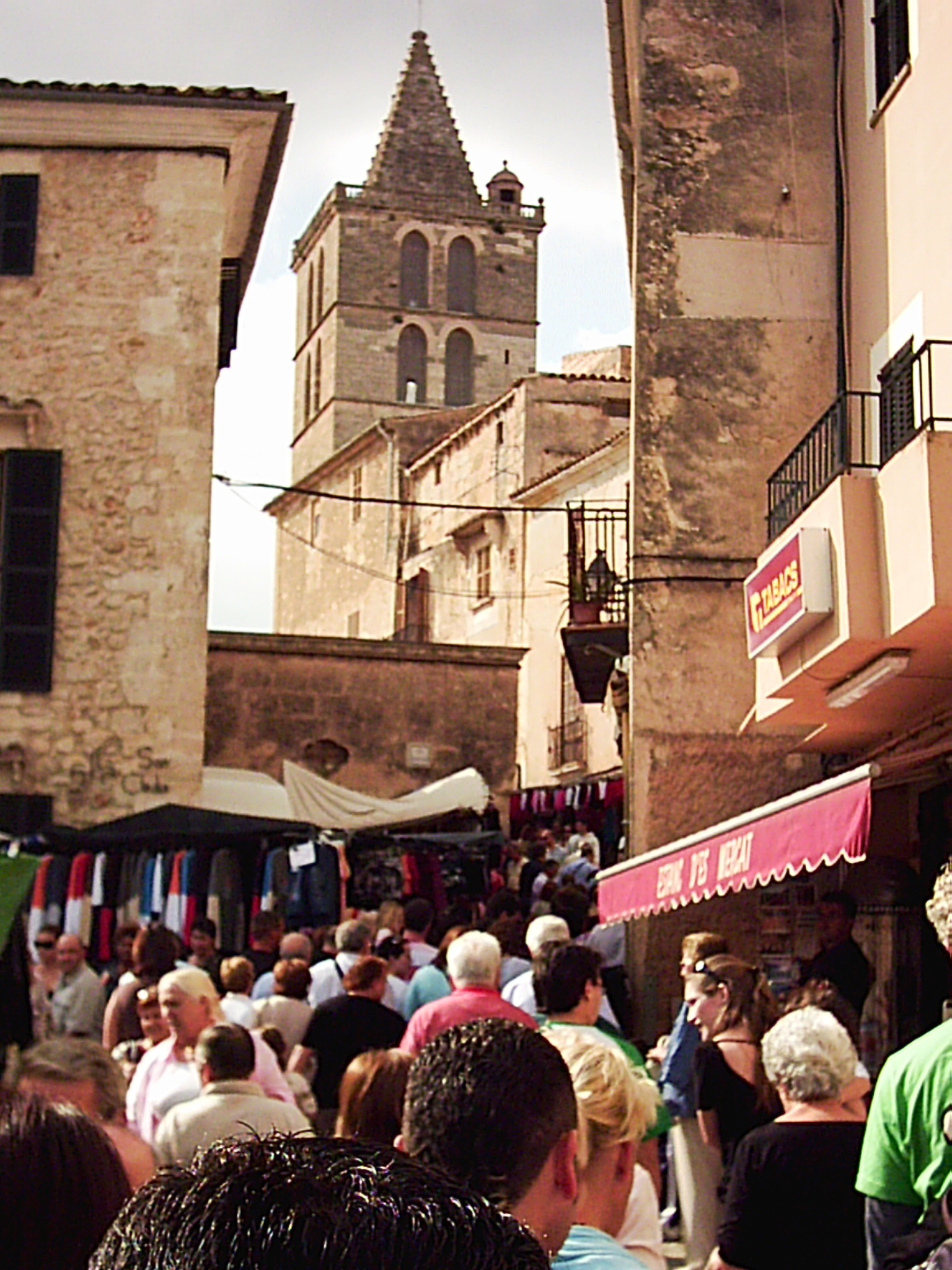
Market at Sineu

Sineu (Balearic Catalan: [siˈnew]) is a municipality in central Mallorca, one of the Balearic Islands, Spain. Olympic cyclist Francisco Tortellá was born here.
