= Sencelles =

- Municipality
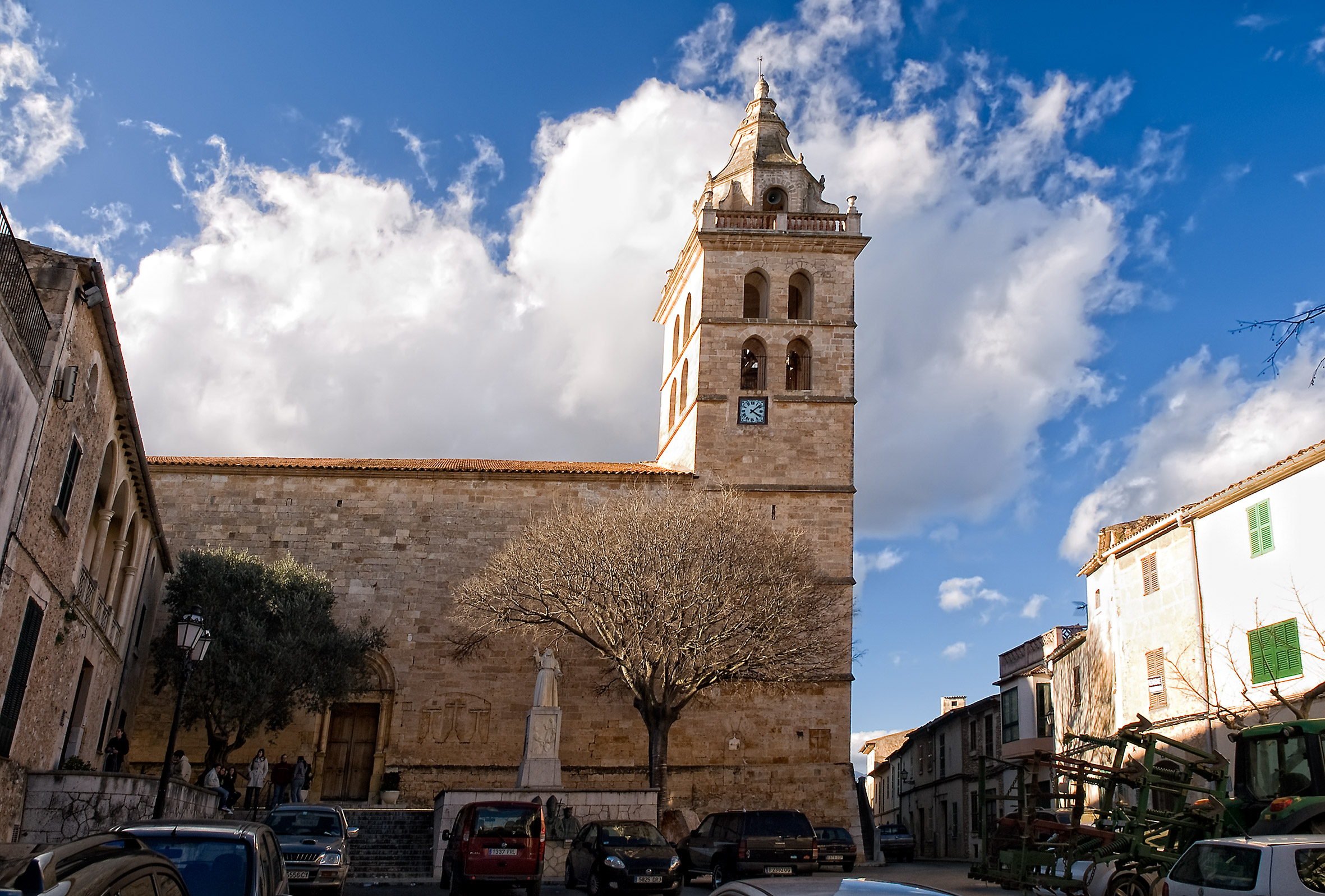
- Parish church of Sant Pere

- Flag Coat of arms

- Map of Sencelles in Mallorca

- Location in Spain Sencelles (Balearic Islands) Sencelles (Spain)
- Coordinates: 39°38′51″N 2°53′53″E
- Country: Spain
- Autonomous community: Balearic Islands
- Province: Balearic Islands
- Comarca: Pla de Mallorca
- Judicial district: Inca

Government
  - Mayor: Joan Carles Verd Cirer

Area
  - Total: 52.86 km^{2} (20.41 sq mi)
- Elevation: 120 m (390 ft)

Population (2025-01-01)
  - Total: 3,973
  - Density: 75.16/km^{2} (194.7/sq mi)
- Demonym: Sencellers
- Time zone: UTC+1 (CET)
  - Summer (DST): UTC+2 (CEST)
- Postal code: 07140
- Website: Official website

Sencelles (Balearic Catalan: [sənˈseʎəs]) is a municipality in central Mallorca, one of the Balearic Islands, Spain. It is located in the centre of the island, 24km away from the island's capital, Palma de Mallorca.
