= Blanes =

- Municipality
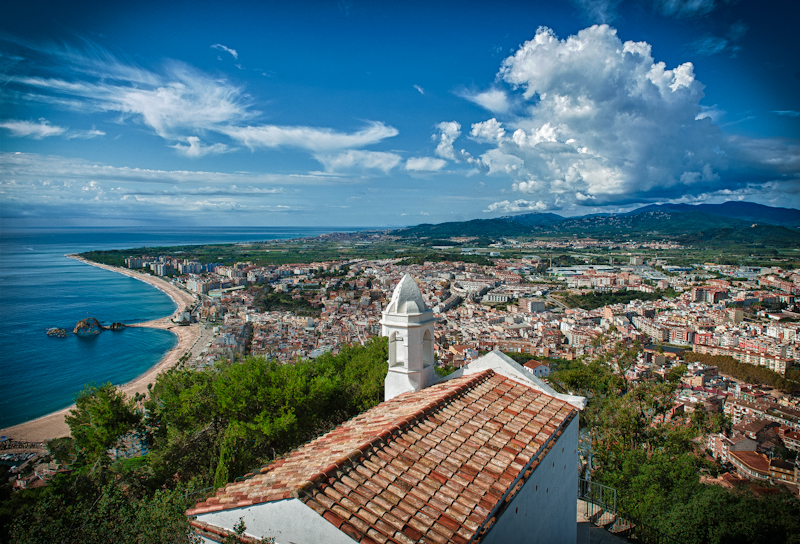
- Overview of Blanes from the top of the mountain

- Flag Coat of arms
- Interactive map of Blanes
- Location within Catalonia Location within Spain
- Coordinates: 41.676°N 2.793°E
- Country: Spain
- Community: Catalonia
- Province: Girona
- Comarca: Selva

Government
  - Mayor: Àngel Canosa Fernàndez (2019) (ERC)

Area
  - Total: 17.7 km^{2} (6.8 sq mi)
- Elevation: 13 m (43 ft)

Population (2025-01-01)
  - Total: 42,699
  - Density: 2,410/km^{2} (6,250/sq mi)
- Demonym: Blanenc/ca
- Postal code: 17300
- Website: blanes.cat

Blanes (Catalan pronunciation: [ˈblanəs], Spanish: [ˈblanes]) is a town and municipality in the comarca of Selva in Girona, Catalonia, Spain. During Roman rule it was named Blanda or Blandae. It is known as the "Gateway to the Costa Brava". Its coast is part of the Costa Brava, which stretches from Blanes to the French border. The township is 18.29 km^{2} (7.06 sq mi). Blanes is a popular tourist town, and it is known for the Concurs de Focs d'Artifici during the Santa Anna festival; this event includes many fireworks. Other places of interest include botanical gardens, coves such as the Cala Bona, and beaches that are surrounded by mountains.

== History ==
The history of Blanes predates the Roman conquest. Iberian activity has been attested in the area. Romanization of Blanes and its surroundings began around the third century BC. Roman remains of the Blandae site lie nearby. After Roman rule ended the area shared the fate of much of the Peninsula, being conquered successively by the Goths, the Moors, and reconquered by the Christians shortly after. In the 13th century, after the Christians regained power, important architectural developments took place in Blanes. Some examples are the palace, Palau Vescomtal, the Església Parroquial church, and the city walls.

In the 17th century, during the Catalan Revolt (Guerra dels Segadors), Blanes was practically burned to ashes. The Palau Vescomtal was completely destroyed.

The War of the Spanish Succession also affected Blanes. Following this, reconstruction and the expansion of agriculture began.

== Geography ==
Blanes has many beaches such as those along the Cala de Sant Francesc. The city borders the Mediterranean sea.

== Demography ==
The population in 2017 was 38,813.

demographic vertical bar chart of between 1900 and 2010
Legal population (1900-1991) or Resident population (2001) according to the population census published by the Instituto Nacional de Estadística.
Population according to the municipal register of 2010 published by the Instituto Nacional de Estadística.

== Botanical gardens ==
One of the botanical gardens in Blanes is the Marimurtra, which covers almost 15 hectares (37 acres). It includes over 4,000 different plant species and is visited by 300,000 people every year. Another garden is the Pinya de Rosa, consisting of over 7,000 different plant species.

== Fireworks competition ==
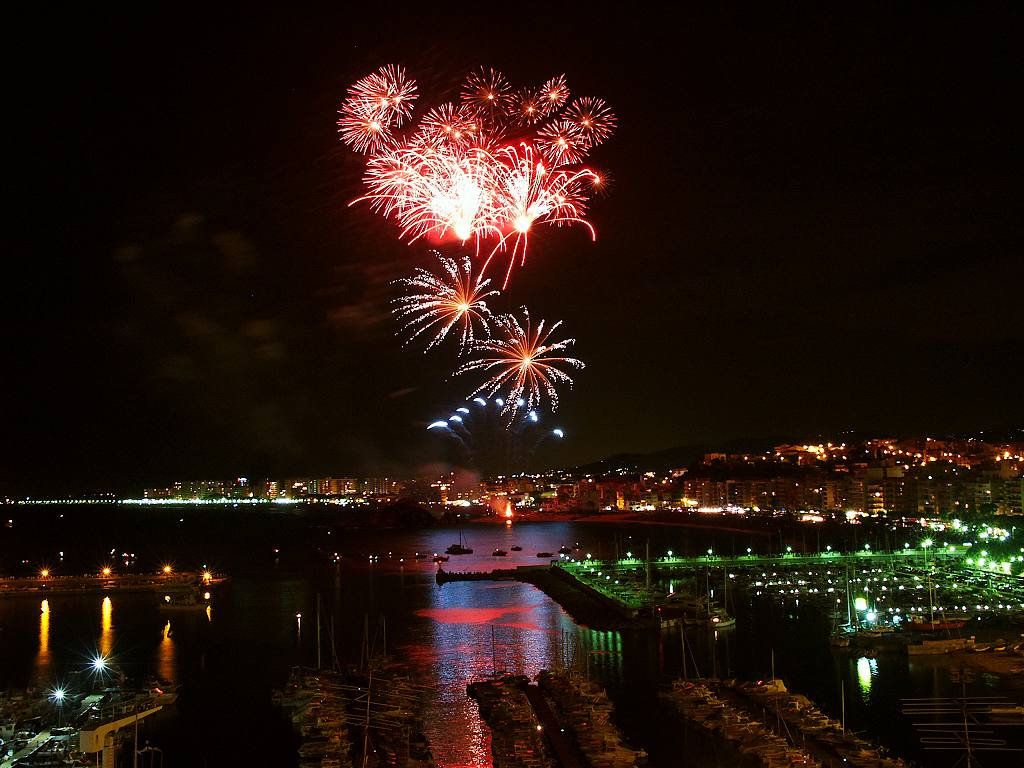
Blanes' fireworks

The Festa major or festival of Santa Anna and Sant Joaquim (on 26 July) is usually celebrated in the third or fourth week of July, from 21 to 27 July, annually. During the eight days, this major festival is celebrated as well as the European Concurs de Focs d'Artifici which attracts more than 500,000 visitors. This is an international competition. Over 500,000 kg (1,100,000 lb) of fireworks are detonated at each event. Most people watch the fireworks from the beach.

The first documented date of a firework launch in Blanes is 1906. It was not until 1962 that the launch became an annual event. 1971 marks the first Fireworks Competition, taking place over three nights; this number has fluctuated over the years to as many as seven nights. Since 1958, fireworks launches have always been done from Sa Palomera, a big rock that separates the two parts of the Blanes coast and is symbolically considered the beginning of the Costa Brava.

Every night of the celebration, a different firework company presents its work to the public who come to the beach, each spectacle lasting between 20 and 24 minutes. This is rated by the Popular Jury, designated each year, who responsible for choosing the winners.

The fireworks competition nearly always runs in the last full week of July. The year 2018 marked the 48th edition of the competition. According to a local radio station, Radio Marina, nearly one million people visited the fireworks competition during its five-day course.

Before 2012, the competition ran for five consecutive days. At the height of Spain's financial crisis, it was decided to drop the event to four days to save money. In 2016 enough sponsors were found to restore the fifth day of the event.

== 2008 storm ==
On 26 December 2008 an unusually strong storm struck Blanes' beach on Boxing Day. The port of Blanes was hit hardest. The old seawall was unable to resist the storm. Many boats were damaged and/or smashed onto the beach. Before the storm, plans had been made to upgrade the harbor but repairs were delayed. The poor state of the harbor made it more vulnerable to the storm surges and resulted in the heavy loss in the Boxing Day storm. This storm has been commonly referred to by locals as the worst storm Blanes had seen since the 1950s.

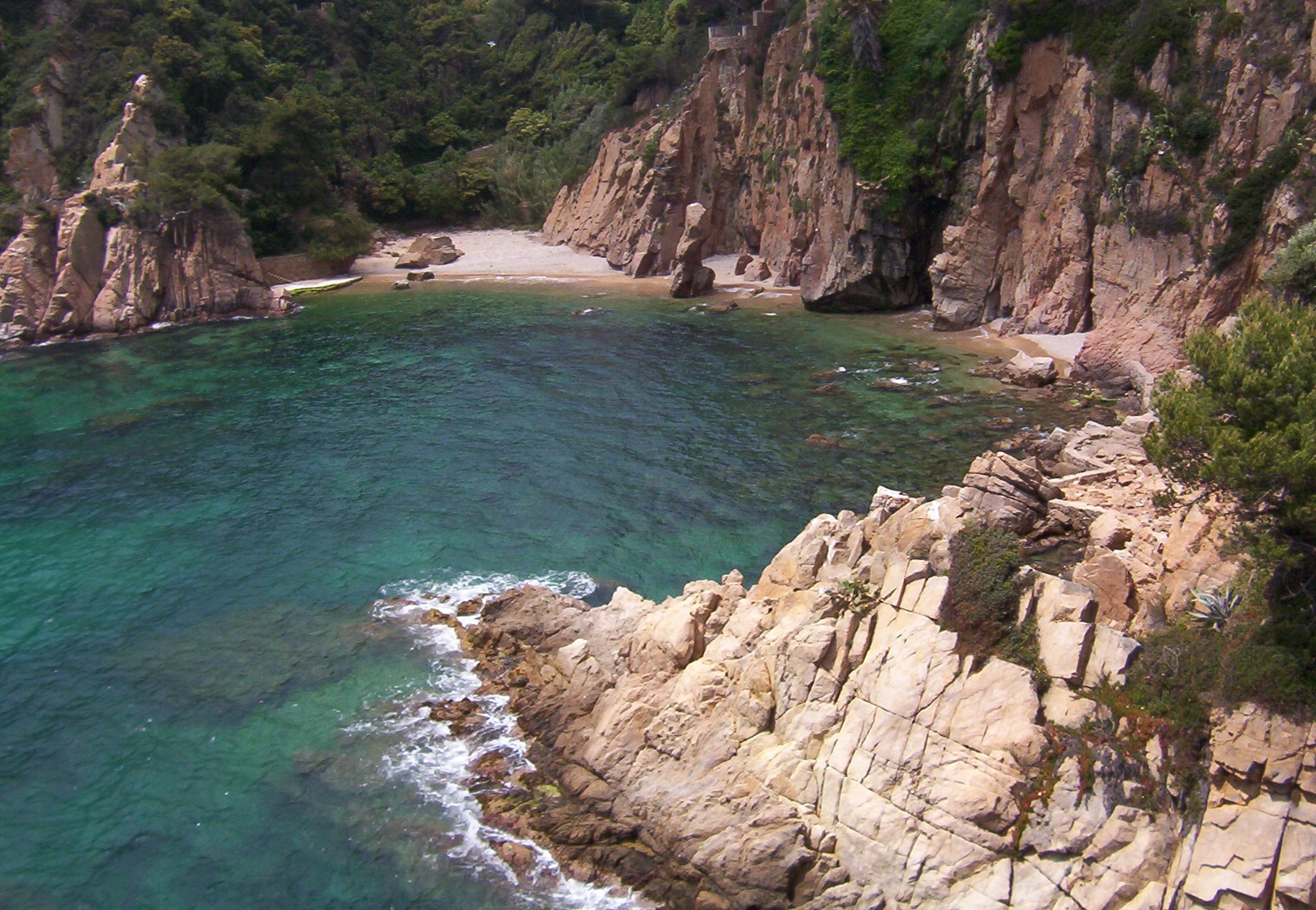
Rocky bay in Blanes

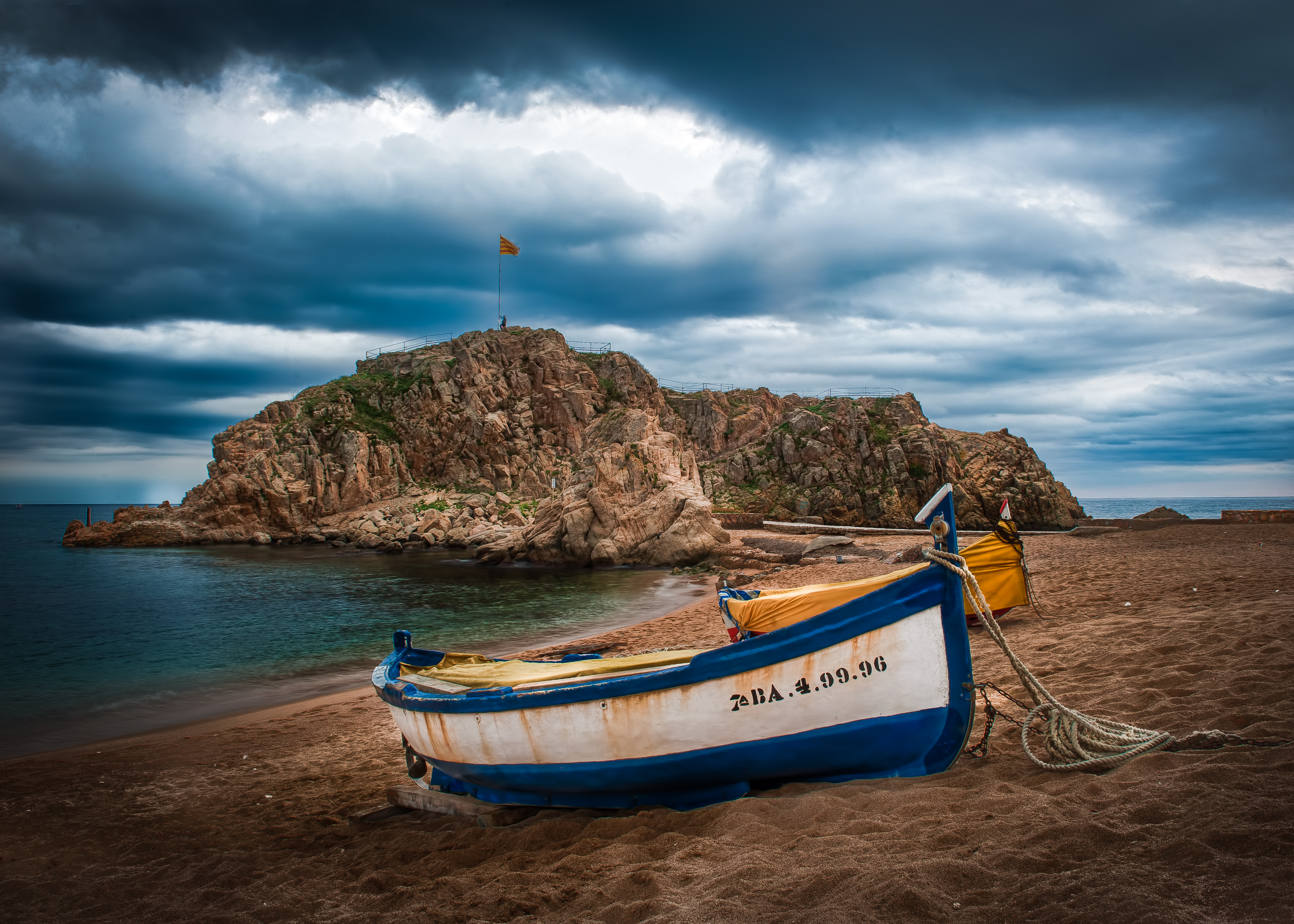
Overlook of the Sa Palomera Rock from the beaches of Blanes

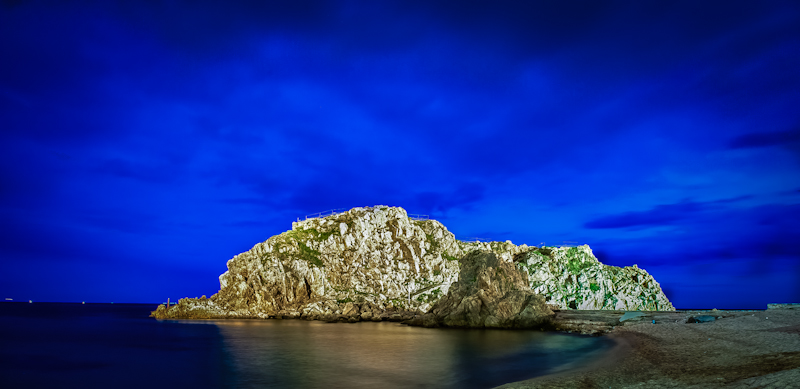
Sa Palomera Rock in Blanes at night

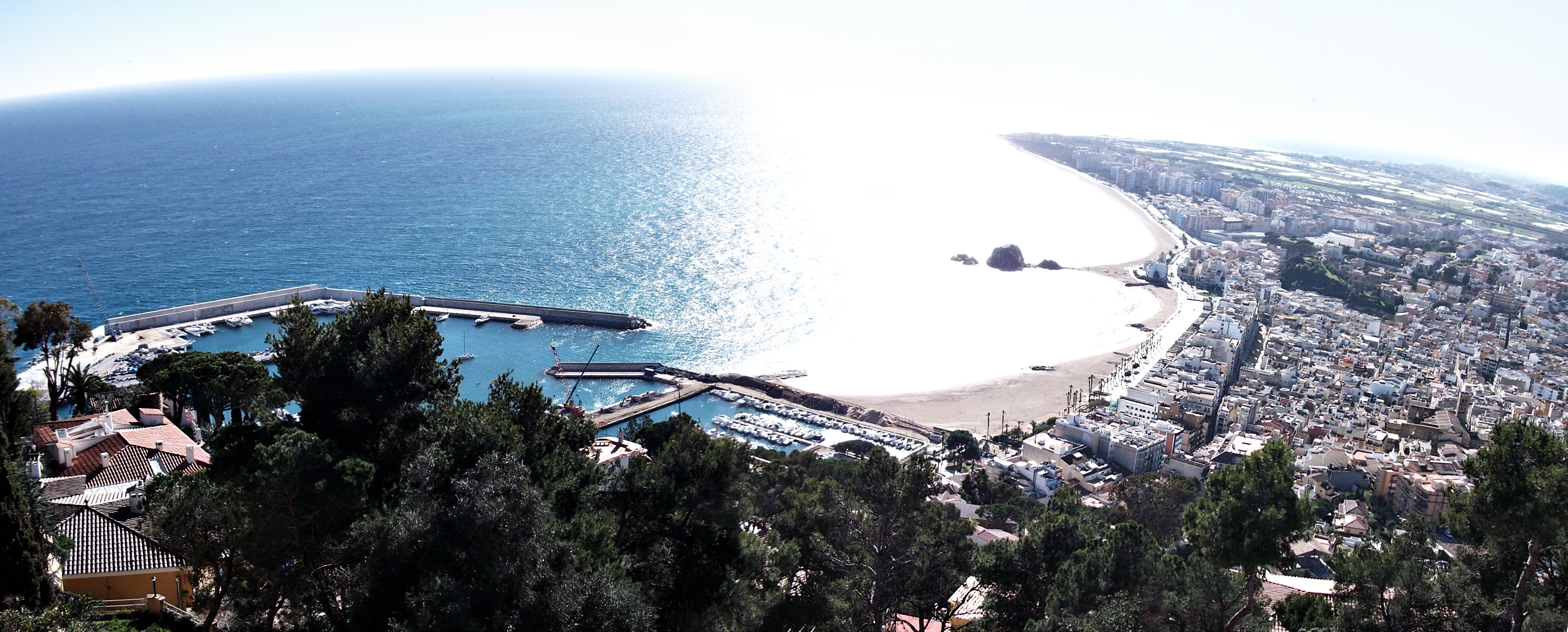
New port of Blanes (since 2012), the town centre, S'Abanell, and Blanes' beaches, the mouth of Tordera's River, and the touristic area of Els Pins.

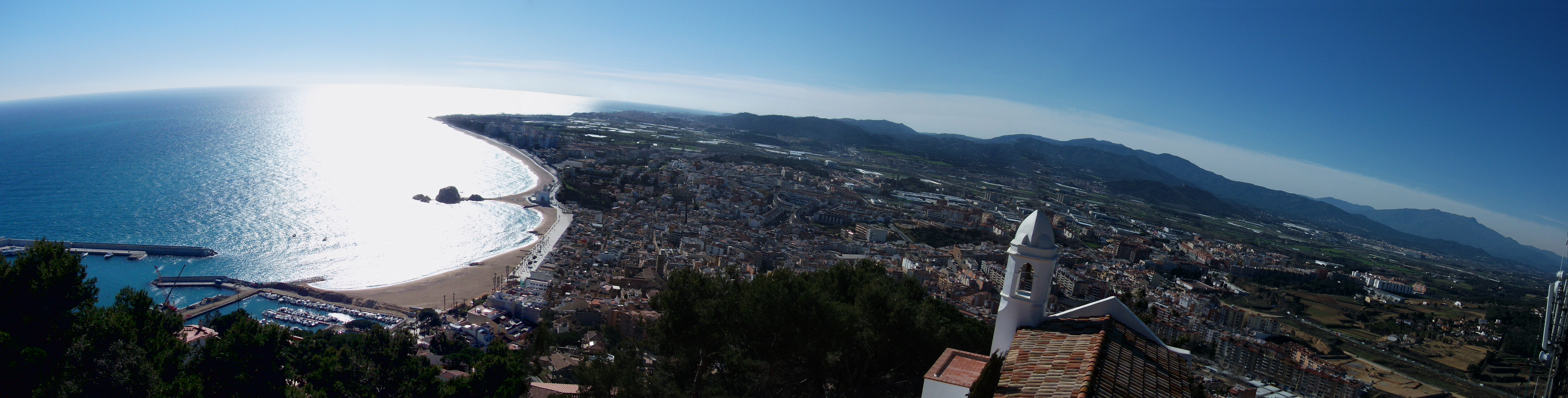
Panorama of Blanes taken from Saint John's Castle. The biggest mountain (on the right) is the Montseny.

== Sport ==
Blanes is home to the Club de Futbol Obispado. The city has a roller hockey team, Blanes Hoquei Club, and competes in the main League OK Liga. Blanes is also home to an international roller hockey tournament, the Golden Cup.

== Notable people ==
- Quim Torra (born 1962) – lawyer, journalist and former president of the Government of Catalonia
- Mamadou Tounkara (born 1996) – footballer
- Rubén Yáñez (born 1993) – footballer
- Roberto Bolaño – Chilean novelist, short-story writer, poet and essayist

== Twin town ==
- Ardales, Andalusia, Spain
