= Colònia de Sant Pere =

- Town
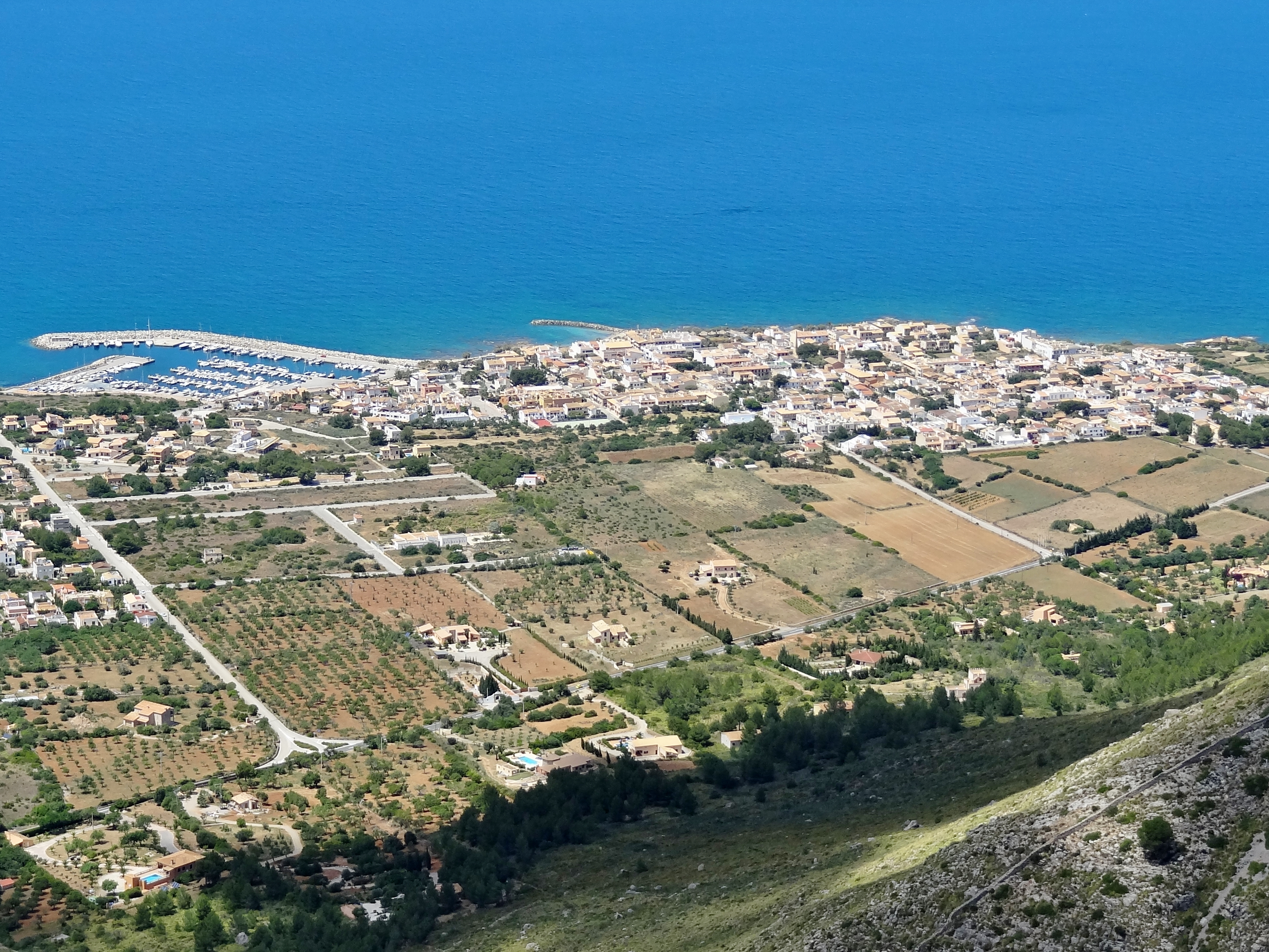
- Nickname: Sa Colònia
- Interactive map of Colònia de Sant Pere
- Coordinates: 39°44′14.05″N 3°16′41.48″E
- Country: Spain
- Autonomous Community: Balearic Islands
- Province: Balearic Islands
- Island: Mallorca
- Comarca: Llevant

Population (2019)
  - Total: 583
- Time zone: UTC+1 (CET)
  - Summer (DST): UTC+2 (CEST)
- Postal code: 07579

Colònia de Sant Pere is a small town at northeast coast of Mallorca, Balearic Islands, Spain. It belongs to Artà municipality. It lies in the bay of Alcúdia. At the beginning, in the 19th century, it used to be a small settlement focused on agriculture and fishing, resident by just a few families. Currently it is a very popular destination for tourists from abroad and local people as it is very small, quiet town and thanks to its location at the sea.

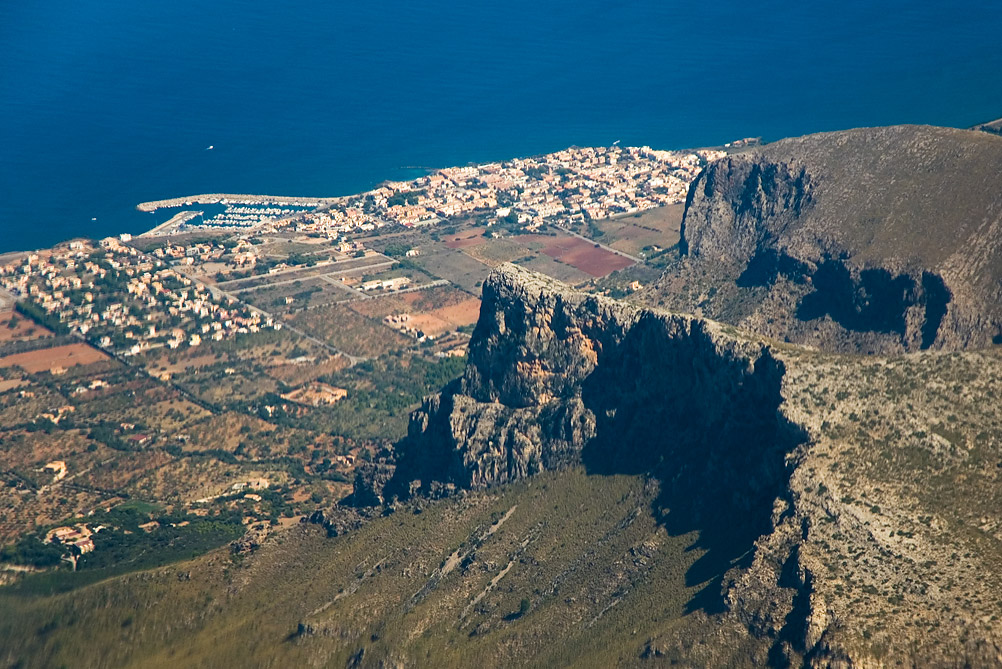

thumb

== Early history of the region ==
The area of Còlonia de Sant Pere became Roman territory for the first time in the year 123 B.C when the Roman general Quintus Caecilius Balearicus conquered the archipelago. Then, in 534, it became the territory of the Byzantian Empire. From 707 the area was under Islamic influence since the Baleares were conquered by the Muslims from the North Africa. The entire island was then conquered by King James I the Conqueror in 1229. In 1344 King Peter IV of Aragon re-incorporated the Baleares into the crown and since then the area of nowadays Colonia de Sant Pedro remained under the crown's rule.
