= Sa Coma =

Resort town in Mallorca, Spain

Coordinates: 39°34′37.74″N 03°22′19.38″E

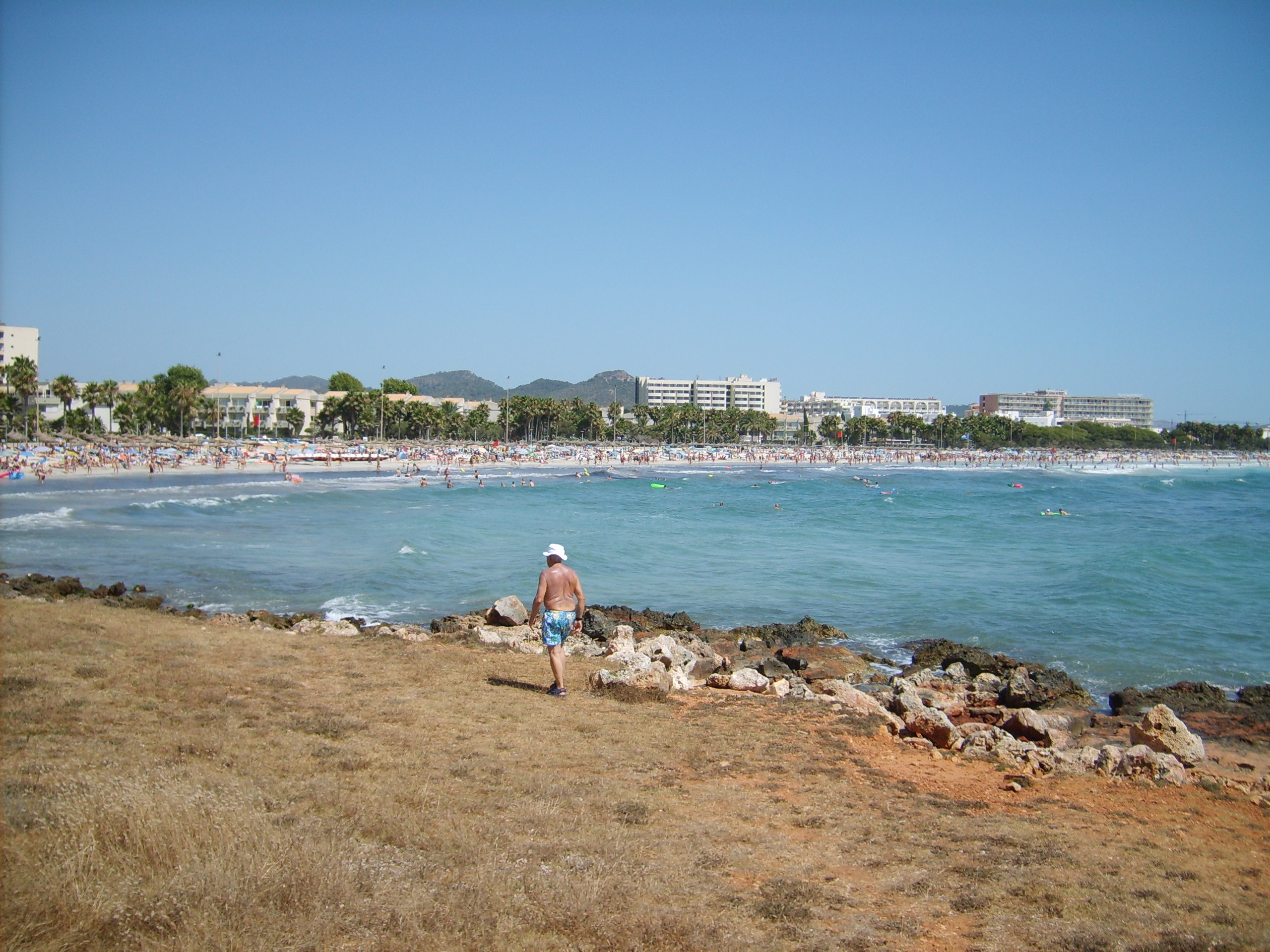
Beach of Sa Coma

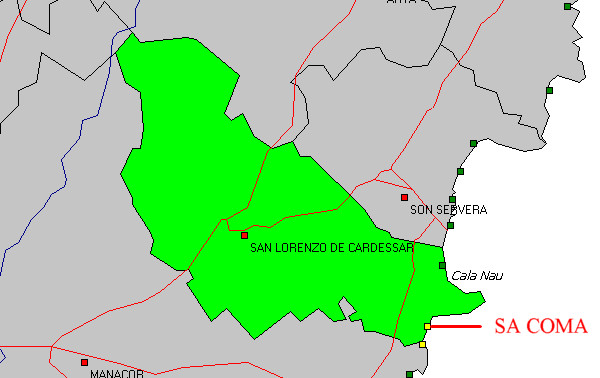
Location of Sa Coma on the Eastern Mallorcan coast

Sa Coma is a town on the east coast of the island of Mallorca, Spain. It is close to the towns of Cala Millor and Cala Bona in the municipality of Sant Llorenç des Cardassar. To the south it merges with the small town of S'illot.

A majority of the residents of Sa Coma work in the hospitality industry and have seasonal contracts. The town's principal industry is tourism, based around its sandy beach, bars and restaurants. The resort has a relaxed atmosphere in contrast to the lively resort of Magaluf on the west coast of the island. Sa Coma is more family oriented, and evening entertainment centres on hotels, rather than in bars or clubs.

Some of the shops in Sa Coma also cater for tourists, with many products in the supermarkets being imported from tourists' home countries. There is a Carrefour hypermarket within Sa Coma town, previously owned by Eroski.

Sa Coma caters for touring Rugby Union teams (15 a side) throughout the year.

== Cycling ==
A 24 km segregated cycle lane (cycle track) connects Sa Coma with Cala Millor and Cala Bona.
