= Sant Llorenç des Cardassar =

- Municipality
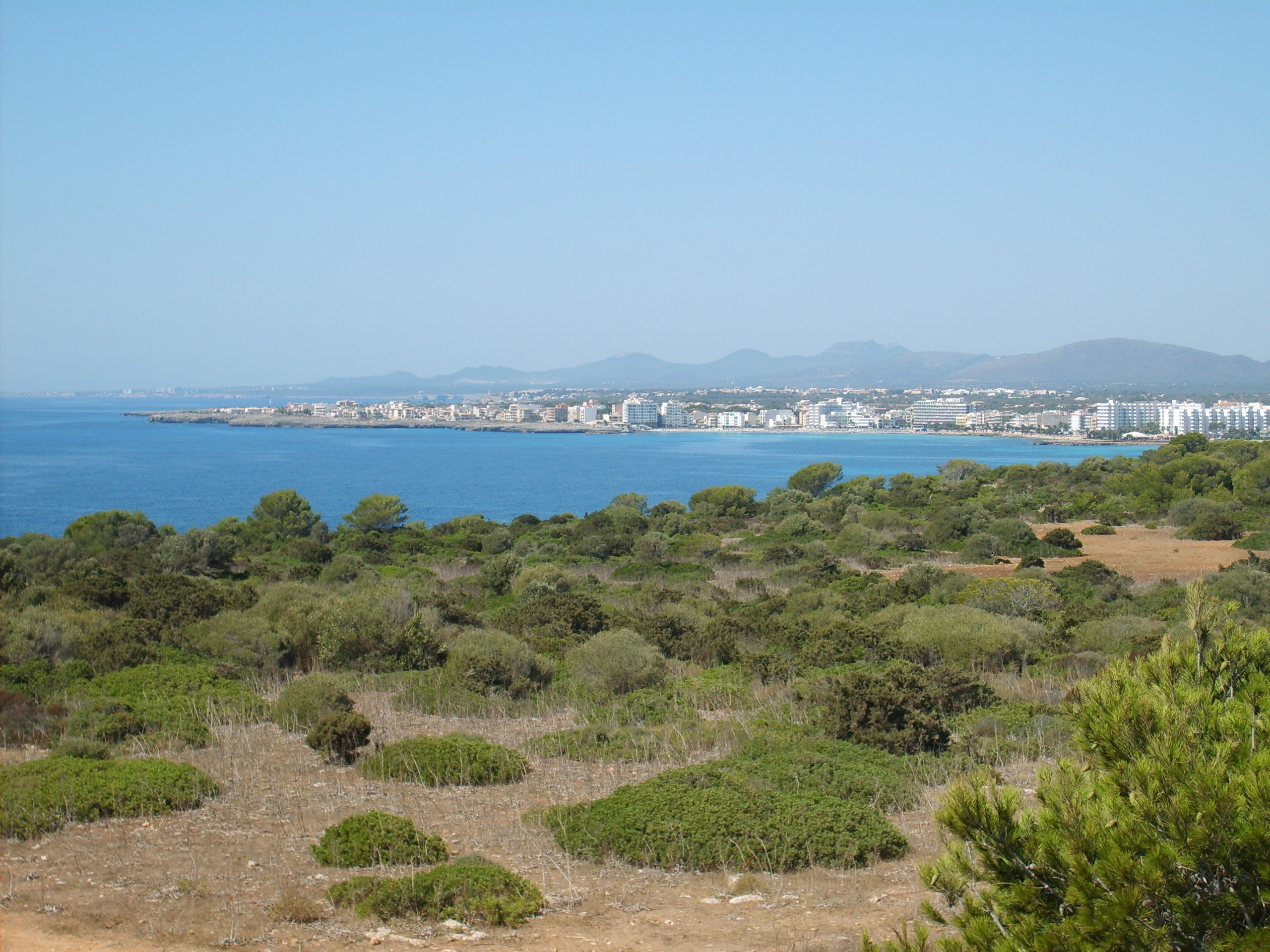
- A view of the bay of s'Illot and Sa Coma

- Coat of arms

- Location within Mallorca

- Location in Mallorca Sant Llorenç des Cardassar (Balearic Islands) Sant Llorenç des Cardassar (Spain)
- Coordinates: 39°36′35″N 3°17′02″E
- Country: Spain
- Autonomous community: Balearic Islands
- Province: Balearic Islands
- Comarca: Llevant
- Judicial district: Manacor

Government
  - Mayor: Mateo Puigrós Sureda

Area
  - Total: 82.08 km^{2} (31.69 sq mi)
- Elevation: 89 m (292 ft)

Population (2025-01-01)
  - Total: 9,231
  - Density: 112.5/km^{2} (291.3/sq mi)
- Time zone: UTC+1 (CET)
  - Summer (DST): UTC+2 (CEST)
- Postal code: 07530

Sant Llorenç des Cardassar (Balearic Catalan: [səɲ ʎoˈɾɛnz ðəs kəɾðəˈsa]) is a small municipality on Mallorca, one of the Balearic Islands, Spain.

== History ==
The Punta de n'Amer Castle was built in the 17th century. Sant Llorenç des Cardassar was part of the municipality of Manacor, until 1892.

Sant Llorenç des Cardassar was the tragic scene of flash floods on the night of 9 October 2018, in which 13 people died. Some 400 troops of the Spanish Army, Civil Guard, firemen, local police, and Civil Protection were mobilized to help trapped people and locate those missing. More than 200 people slept in shelters that were set up for those affected.

== Geography ==
Sant Llorenç is 34 mi (55 km) east of Palma de Mallorca, the island's capital. The municipality, on the eastern coast of the island of Mallorca, adjoins the municipalities of Manacor, Petra, Artà and Son Servera. Inland, the municipality contains the town centre of Sant Llorenç and the village of Son Carrió. On the coast, within the municipality, are Sa Coma, the northern part of s'Illot, and the southern part of Cala Millor, which are all beachside tourist areas. The Punta de n'Amer, a headland at the eastern end of the municipality, separates the beaches of Cala Millor and Sa Coma.

== Demography ==
Historical population

Year	Pop.	±%
1897	2,503	—
1900	2,464	−1.6%
1910	2,920	+18.5%
1920	3,065	+5.0%
1930	3,706	+20.9%

Year	Pop.	±%
1940	3,745	+1.1%
1950	3,869	+3.3%
1960	3,622	−6.4%
1970	3,924	+8.3%
1981	3,955	+0.8%

Year	Pop.	±%
1991	4,416	+11.7%
2001	6,503	+47.3%
2011	8,490	+30.6%

Note: De jure population

== Transport ==
=== Roads ===
The Ma-15, the main road from Palma, acts as a bypass around the southern and eastern sides of the town centre of Sant Llorenç, continuing north through Artà. The Ma-4030 road connects the town centre of Sant Llorenç with Son Servera, to the east. The Ma-4023 road is on an approximate north-south axis, parallel to the coast but about 1 mi (1.6 km) inland from the beach areas, connecting Son Servera with Porto Cristo.

== Media ==
The ITV2 series Love Island is filmed on the outskirts of the town. Google Earth imagery indicates that its situated on farmland belongings to the Finca Sa Vinyassa whereupon the Love Island 'Villa' is filmed inside. Albeit the traditional Mallorcan style furnishing of the villa is stripped away and replaced with aesthetically pleasing colours and lights for the duration of the production.

== Notable people ==
- Margarita Fullana, a mountain biker who won a bronze medal at the 2000 Summer Olympics in Sydney, was born in the municipality.
