= Botanic Garden Marimurtra =

Botanical garden in Catalonia, Spain

Coordinates: 41°40′37″N 2°48′10″E

The Botanical Garden Marimurtra is a botanical garden located in the town of Blanes, Girona, Catalonia, Spain.

Spanning approximately 16 hectares and home to over 4,000 species, the garden is considered one of the most important botanical gardens in Europe. In addition to plants endemic to Catalonia and the Mediterranean region, it features a substantial collection of cacti and other succulent plants native to the arid regions of Southern Africa and Central America. Inside, Marimurta also features other various types of gardens—per types of climatic regions, subtropical, temperate, and Mediterranean—with a additional viewing of the Costa Brava.

== History ==
The garden, founded in 1921 by the German industrialist Karl Faust, is part of the Botanic Gardens Conservation International and in 2009 received the Creu de Sant Jordi award of distinction from the Catalonian government.

== Description ==
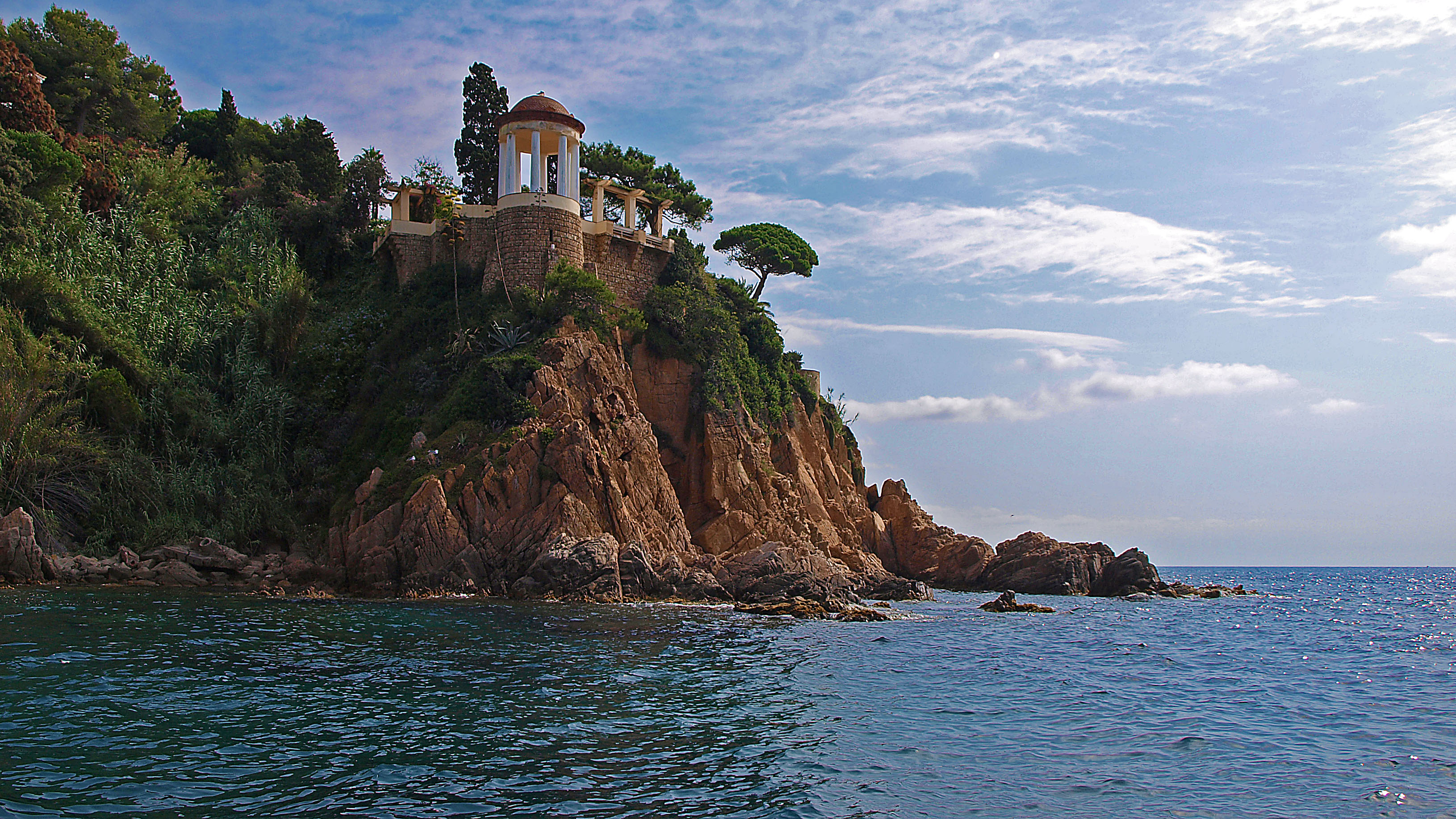
View of the garden from the Mediterranean Sea

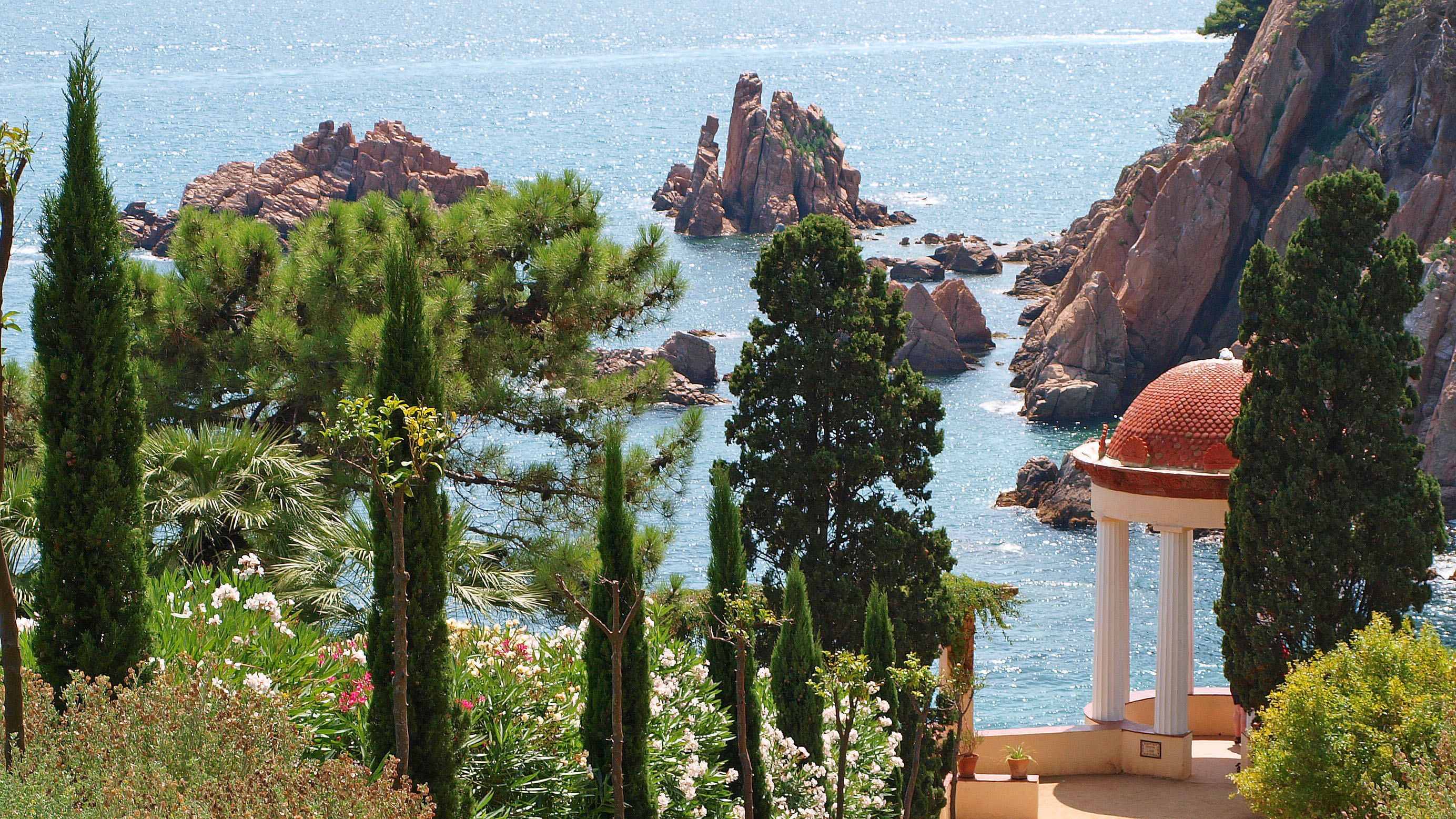
View of the sea from the garden

The architectural ensemble of the botanical garden is composed —in addition to the pergolas, the warehouses and the work spaces— of the buildings at the entrance to the garden and the small temples or viewpoints between the cove of sa Forcanera and Cala Bona. As for the house-pergola at the entrance, the classical typology of sgraffitos and the corner balcony with specific roof and wrought iron brackets stand out.
