= S'illot (Mallorca) =

Small tourist town on the south east coast of Mallorca, Spain

- Town
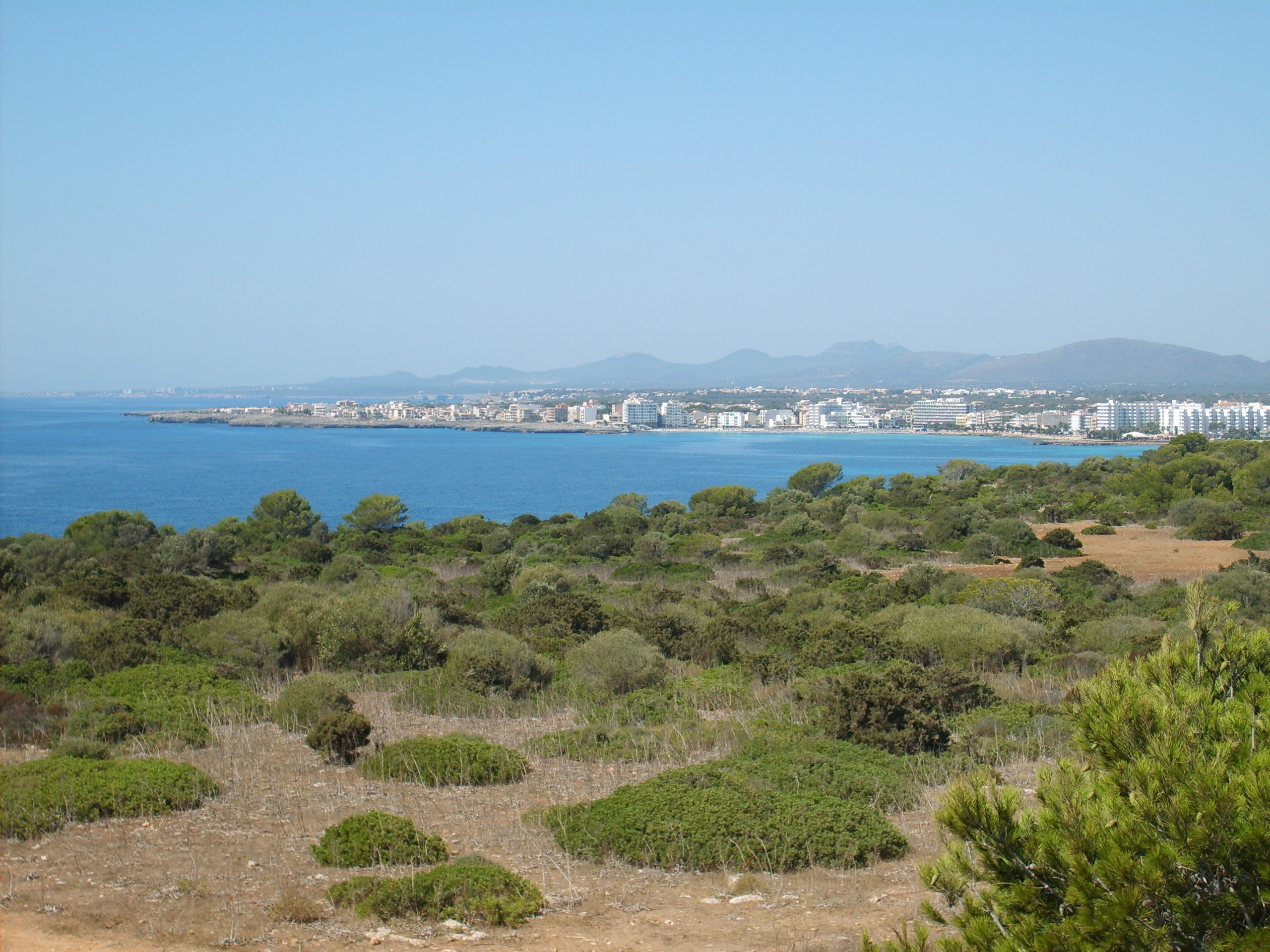
- View of the bay of S'illot and Sa Coma
- Etymology: Catalan for "islet"
- Location within Mallorca
- Coordinates: 39.577°N 3.372°E
- Country: Spain
- Autonomous Community: Balearic Islands
- Island: Mallorca

Population (2016)
  - Total: 1,988

S'illot is a small tourist town on the south east coast of the Balearic Island of Mallorca, Spain, divided between the council areas of Manacor and Sant Llorenç des Cardassar. The two districts are separated by the river Torrent de Ca n'Amer which is spanned by a large bridge in the town. A range of seaside leisure activities take place in the town. At the entrance to the town there is prehistoric settlement that is well preserved.

== Geography ==
S'Illot is located 63 km east of Palma de Mallorca and 16 km east of Manacor. The little cove of Cala Morlanda and the wide beach of Cala Moreia are situated to the town's south, while the resort of Sa Coma lies immediately to its north. There is a headland of craggy rock projecting out into the sea between S'illot and Sa Coma.

S'Illot is near the larger town of Porto Cristo and other tourist resorts such as Cala Millor. It is linked to Palma and to Palma de Mallorca Airport by the Autovia MA-15 highway that crosses the island from east to west.

== History ==
The word "Illot" is Catalan for "islet", and the name is derived from a small rocky island off the coast. The site of the town was occupied in prehistory, but was abandoned around the second century BC at the time of the Romanisation of Mallorca following the Second Punic War.

Modern S'illot developed from a fishing village and fishing boats still work from a small harbour. The town originated as summer resort for the inhabitants of Manacor in the 1930s. The division of Ca n'Amer de S'Illot into development plots was approved in 1948 and the urban development of S'Illot took place from 1959. In 1965 S'Illot and Cala Millor together had 19 hotels with a total of 1414 beds. Tourism is now the town's primary economic activity.

== Facilities ==
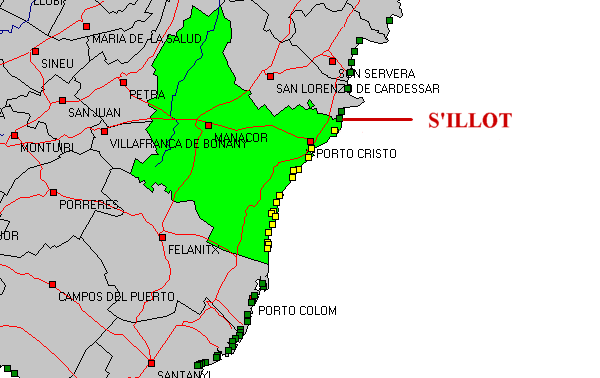
Map showing the location of S'illot

The town is mostly flat. Its beach is 350 metres long with an average width of 50 metres. It is a sandy Blue Flag beach and is backed by a promenade with bars, restaurants, cafes and tourist shops. Beach-related facilities include lifeguards, showers and the rental of sun loungers, parasols and watersports equipment.

The town has many hotels but is quieter than the neighbouring resort of Sa Coma with few lively bars, the evening entertainment being mainly provided by the hotels. There is also a small Eroski supermarket called "aprop" and a tourist information office. S'illot is on a number of bus routes.

== Population ==
It is difficult to measure the population of this tourist town due to its membership of two different municipalities. According to data from 2016, 243 inhabitants lived in the Sant Llorenç part and 1745 in the Manacor part. However, the latter figure also includes residents of the small resort of Cala Morlanda. As many of the dwellings are second homes, the population increases notably the summer months.

== Ancient monument ==
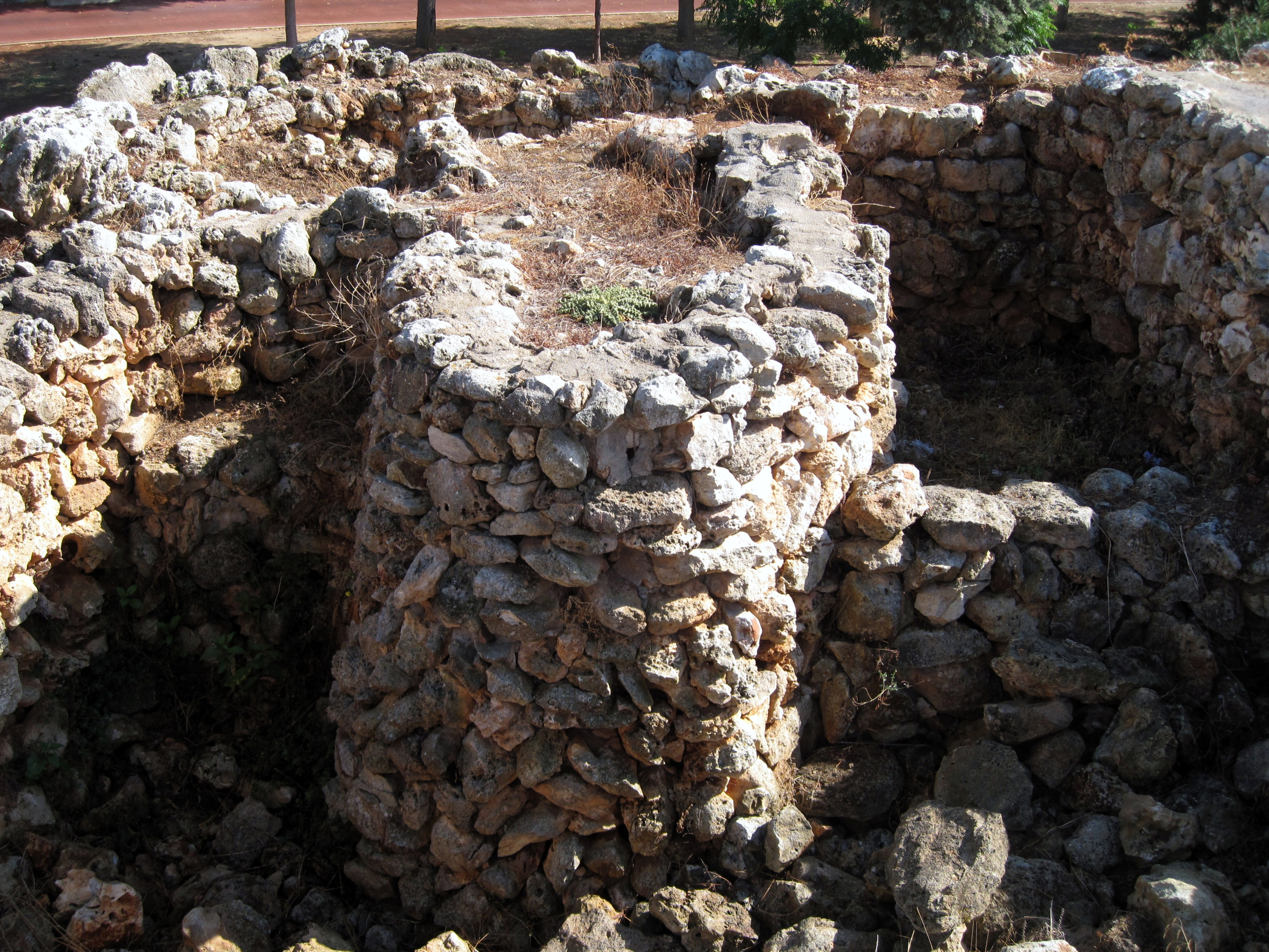
Central part of the Talaiotic village settlement of s'Illot

Within the current town there are the remains of the Poblat Talaiòtic de s'Illot, a Talaiotic village. The earliest discoveries on the site date from 2200 BC and the talliot itself dates from around 1100 BC. The site reflects the Talaiotic culture of the Balearic islands between the late 2nd millennium BCE and the Punic Wars in the late 1st millennium BCE. The approximately 200 inhabitants of the settlement mainly practiced agriculture. Of great importance were hunting and the breeding of pigs and sheep. At the village's centre was a square talaiot (a megalithic structure of uncertain purpose) surrounded by 35 houses, which in turn were surrounded by the defensive wall of the town. In 123 BC the settlement was abandoned as a result of Roman colonization of the island. Between 1960 and 1970 the settlement was excavated by archaeologists from the University of Marburg. The remains are now located in a public square set amongst housing and hotels. The site is open to the public following a redevelopment project which has added walkways and picnic areas, viewing platforms and interpretation boards, and a visitor centre.

== Nearby places of Interest ==
- Talaiot de Cala Morlanda – About 690 meters south of Cala Moreia, near the beach of Cala Morlanda, are the remains of a talaiot.
- Talaiot de na Pol – This circular talaiot is located in the middle of the neighboring village of Sa Coma, near the Safari Park.
- Punta de n'Amer – This headland is classed as an area of special environmental interest. It is a nature reserve about 200 hectares in size, located about two kilometers north of the resort at the end of the beach promenade. This landscape can be explored on numerous small paths. The castle, built in 1696 and which once served as a shelter from pirates, is open to the public. It houses a small museum and serves as a viewpoint over the bay of Cala Millor.
- Cuevas del Drach – The large accessible limestone cave system Cuevas del Drach ("dragon caves") is located about seven kilometers southeast of S'Illot near Porto Cristo. It stretches over 1700 meters and has six lakes. Within the caves is Martel Lake, Europe's largest underground lake. Regular concerts are organized in the caves.
- Caló d'en Rafalino – This nearby small cove south of Cala Morlanda has a naturist beach.
- Mini Golf Paradis – This miniature golf course is nearby.

== Annual celebrations and events ==
- The Patron Saint's Day Festival in S'Illot is held at the end of August and ends with a firework display that can be watched from the beach.
- The Fiestas de S'Illot take place annually on the second weekend of September.
- The Fiestas del Turista were created with the intention of extending the tourist summer season and take place annually around the last weekend in September in S'Illot as well as in Cala Millor and Sa Coma.
