= CF Obispado =

Spanish football club

Obispado
- Full name: Club de Futbol Obispado
- Founded: 2005
- Dissolved: 2013
- Ground: Municipal Pedro Alía Dorado, Blanes, Catalonia, Spain
- Chairman: Juan Barrera
- Manager: Borja Gallardo and Xavi Alonso
- 2012–13: Tercera Catalana – Group 16, 17th of 18
Home colours	Away colours

Club de Futbol Obispado was a football team based in Blanes, Catalonia. Founded in 2005 and dissolved in 2013, it last played in Tercera Catalana – Group 16.

== Season to season ==
Season	Tier	Division	Place	Copa del Rey
2005–06	9	3º Terr.	9th	
2006–07	9	3º Terr.	1st	
2007–08	8	2º Terr.	17th	
2008–09	9	3º Terr.	2nd	
2009–10	8	2º Terr.	9th	
2010–11	8	2º Terr.	14th	
2011–12	7	3ª Cat.	13th	
2012–13	7	3ª Cat.	17th	
