= Marquess of Llevant de Mallorca =

Hereditary title in the Spanish nobility

- Marquess noble crown
- Creation date: 24 June 2025
- Created by: Felipe VI
- Peerage: Spanish nobility
- First holder: Excmo. Sr. D. Rafael Nadal, 1st Marquess of Llevant de Mallorca
- Present holder: Rafael Nadal, 1st Marquess of Llevant de Mallorca
- Heir apparent: Rafael Nadal Perelló
- Remainder to: heirs of the body of the grantee according to absolute primogeniture
- Subsidiary titles: The Most Illustrious (Note: This honorific accompanies the Marquess title. However, if the bearer possesses a senior honorific based on membership of a separate royal order (as does Nadal), the higher-level honorific takes precedence.)
- Status: Extant

Marquess of Llevant de Mallorca (Spanish: Marqués del Llevant de Mallorca) is a hereditary title in the Spanish nobility, created in 2025 by King Felipe VI in favor of former world No. 1 tennis player and 22-time major champion Rafael Nadal, widely regarded as one of the greatest athletes in the history of the sport. It is one of the first two hereditary titles created by Felipe VI, alongside Marquess of Alfonsín on the same date.

== Name ==
Map of Mallorca showing location of Llevant

The title takes its name from Llevant, a region located on the island of Mallorca whose main municipality is Manacor; the place of origin of Nadal.

== Creation ==
After being announced on 19 June 2025, on the 11th anniversary of King Felipe's accession, on 24 June the monarch signed Royal Decree 517/2025, of 24 June, that stated:

The spirit of improvement, tenacity, discipline, sportsmanship and authentic simplicity, on and off the court, have taken Mr. Rafael Nadal Parera to the top of world tennis and are an example of the highest sporting values, so, wanting to show him my Royal appreciation,
I grant him the title of Marquess of Llevant de Mallorca, for him and his successors, in accordance with Spanish nobility law.

— FELIPE R., Royal Decree n.º 517 of 24 June 2025.

== Current holder ==
Rafael Nadal Parera, 1st Marquess of Llevant de Mallorca (born 3 June 1986), is a former professional tennis player. He is the son of businessman Sebastián Nadal Homar and his wife, Ana María Parera Femenías. He has two paternal uncles, Miguel Ángel Nadal, a former professional footballer, and Toni Nadal, who introduced him to tennis and coached him for most of his career.

As a teenager, he met María Francisca (Mery) Perelló Pascual, a friend of his sister, and they started dating in 2005. They married in 2019, and have two children: Rafael Nadal Perelló (born 2022) and Miquel Nadal Perelló (born 2025).

== Line of succession ==
- Sebastián Nadal Homar (b. 1963)
  - Rafael Nadal Parera, 1st Marquess of Llevant de Mallorca (b. 1986)
    - (1) Rafael Nadal Perelló (b. 2022)
    - (2) Miquel Nadal Perelló (b. 2025)
