= Cala Bona =

Town in Majorca, Spain

Coordinates: 39°36′46″N 3°23′25″E

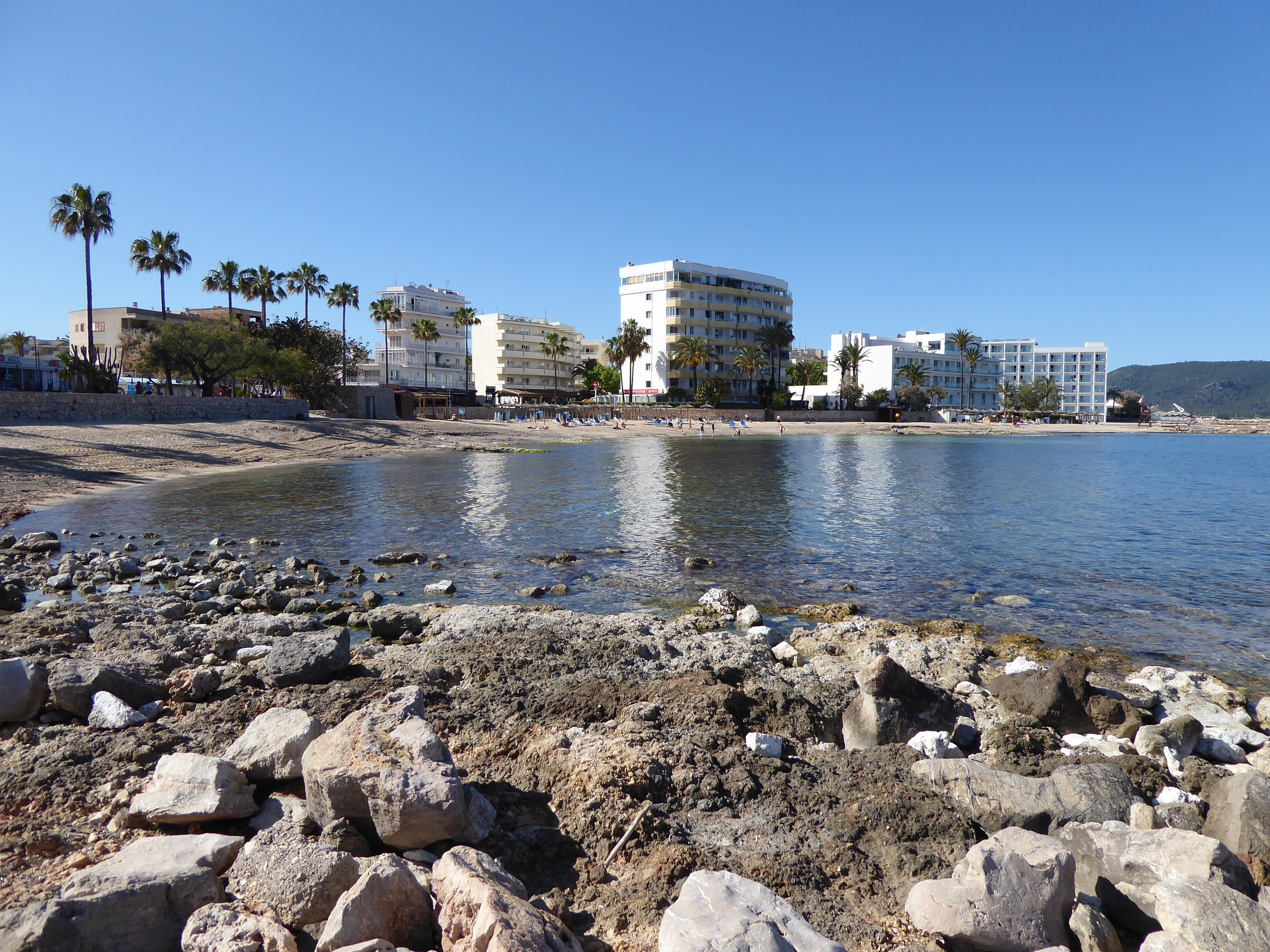
View of the beach at Cala Bona, Majorca

Cala Bona is a small fishing town and holiday resort on the east coast of Majorca in the Balearic Islands of Spain. It consists of a cove with a harbour and surrounding coastal area and lies within the municipality of Son Servera. The population of the town in 2005 was 1,088 inhabitants. In 2011, it had a population of 1,258. It is located to the north of Cala Millor, to which is connected by a promenade, and it lies to the south of Port Verd. Fodor's 1989 guide to Spain described Cala Bona in these terms: "Once an unspoiled fishing village, but now overwhelmed by neighboring Cala Millor. Mixed rocky and excellent sandy beach."

== History ==
Before the beginning of the tourist boom, Cala Bona was a village in a small natural harbour between Cap d'es Pinar and the peninsula of Punta de n'Amer. At that time the village only consisted of a pair of houses where a few families lived by fishing. The fishermen worked on the harbour and at sea, rowing and sailing their llaüts (small traditional Catalan wooden boats) to the surrounding rocky promontories, following the breeding lobsters. In 1924 the first guest house opened, a place called "Cap Cupe" which later became the "Hotel Cala Bona".

Following the arrival of tourism, the area began to be urbanized with hotels, restaurants and homes. Along with the neighbouring village of Cala Millor, Cala Bona grew from the 60s onwards into a significant holiday resort. The port and promenade were redesigned and expanded in 2006. The harbourmaster was given a new building and a fuel station for leisure boats was built. Cala Bona and Cala Millor are now connected by hotels and catering establishments. In recent years the number of hotel rooms in Cala Bona has increased considerably. Many of the tourists who stay in Cala Bona, unlike those in Cala Millor, are of British origin.

== Facilities ==
In addition to the town's 14 hotels there are numerous bars and restaurants and a main shopping street. Along the Cala Bona seafront are three rocky beaches protected by artificial breakwaters. The town's sandy beach has a length of 550 metres (1,800 ft) and a width of 9 metres (30 ft), and is located south of the harbour. The main beach has been certified by AENOR to UNE 170001 standard for universal accessibility, making it suitable for people with disabilities. In 2006, both the beach and the harbour received a Blue Flag beach award for water quality from the Ministry of the Environment in Madrid. The expansion of the port has also allowed for the provision of tour boats for the enjoyment of holidaymakers staying in the East Majorca area. Hiking trails run from the town itself, and there are also opportunities for diving and fishing.

On 16 July in Cala Bona there are celebrations and a sea procession in honour of the patron saint of sailors Nostra Senyora del Carme.

Near Cala Bona further south are the towns of Sa Coma and Porto Cristo, as well as the Caves of Drach which are one of the island's most visited attractions.
