= Llevant =

Comarca of Mallorca

Coordinates: 39°38′36″N 3°20′23″E

Map of Majorca showing location of Llevant

Llevant (Balearic Catalan: [ʎəˈvant], Catalan for "East") is a comarca on the east side of the Balearic island of Mallorca, Spain.

It includes the following municipalities:

- Artà
- Capdepera
- Manacor
- Santa Margalida
- Son Servera
- Sant Llorenç des Cardassar

On 24 June 2025, former tennis player Rafael Nadal was created Marquess of Llevant de Mallorca.
