= Cala Millor =

Town on Balearic Island, Spain

Coordinates: 39°36′02″N 3°23′01″E

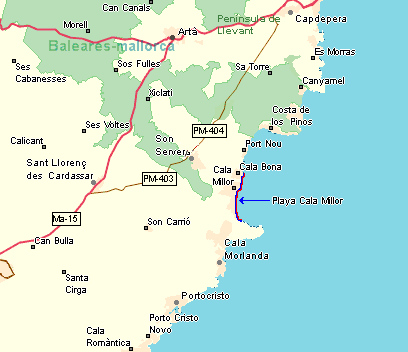
Location of Cala Millor on the eastern Mallorca Coast

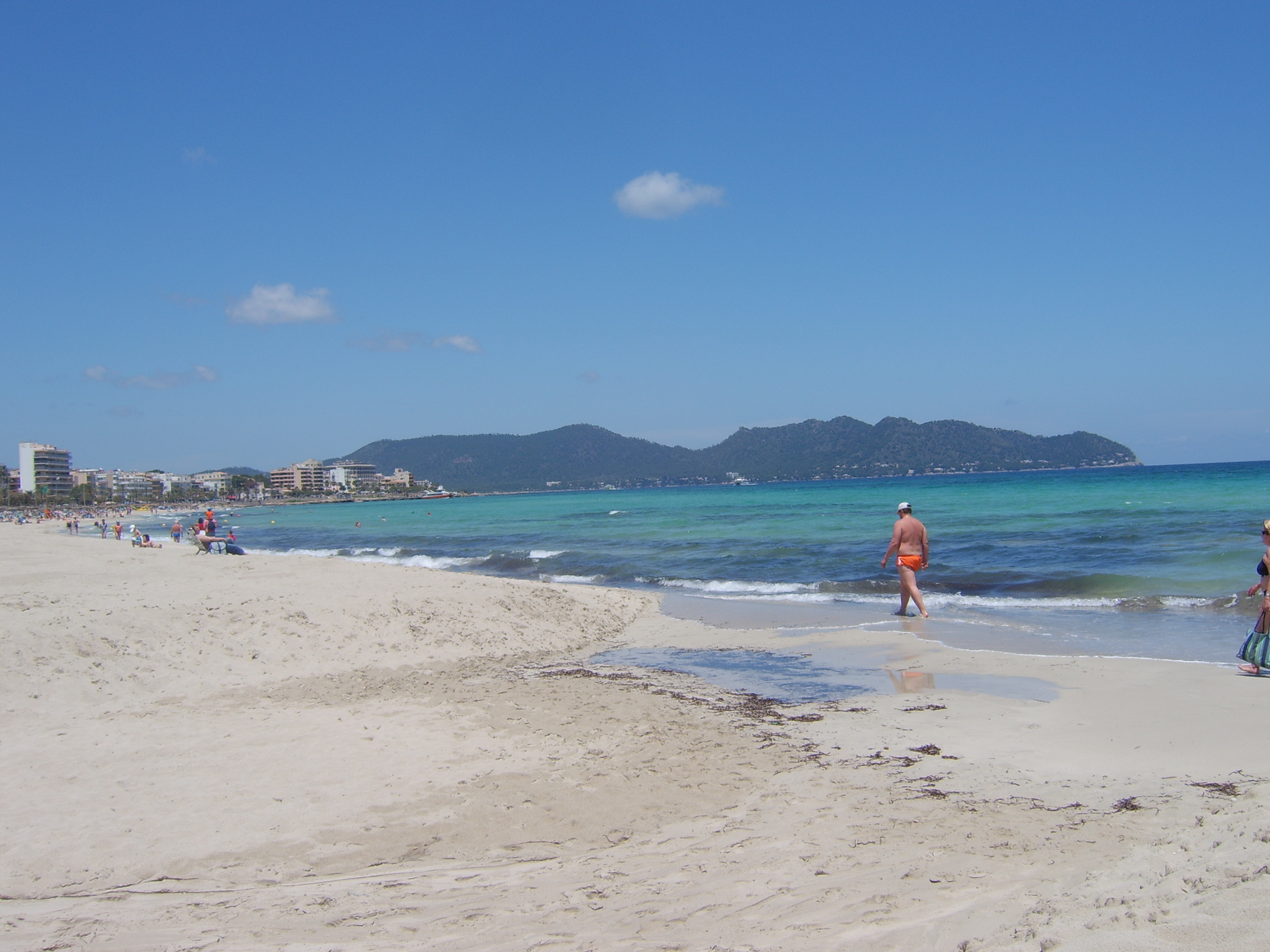
The seashore

Cala Millor is a town located on the Spanish Balearic Island of Mallorca. It consists of a small bay in the municipalities of Son Servera and Sant Llorenç des Cardassar. Overlooked by Mt. Na Penyal to the west.

With over 5,000 inhabitants and multiple hotels, it is the largest tourist destination on the east coast of the island. The town has a well-maintained beach and is within an hour's drive of the capital Palma de Mallorca, and half an hour's drive from Cuevas del Drach.

The island's main airport, Palma de Mallorca Airport, AKA PMI, is on the west side of Palma de Mallorca, and is 70 kilometers west of Cala Millor.

== Tourism ==
The first place to accommodate tourists in the community was the Hotel Eureka, which was built and opened in 1933, shortly followed by the Hotel Universal and the Hotel Talayot. Then many others. While most hotels from the old days have long been demolished and replaced with more modern buildings, the Hotel Talayot is still operating to this day. Though it has been heavily refurbished and modernized from its original form.

The beach of Cala Millor is 1.8 kilometres long, and during the summer season is cleaned daily between the hours of 5 am to 6am, by a small modified tractor that sifts the sand to remove any debris. It is also overseen by 3 lifeguard towers, operating on a system of Blue, Green, Yellow, and Red flags, to alert swimmers of the danger levels. This is in sharp contrast to the winter season, when the beach is left unmonitored and uncleaned, usually accumulating big piles of seaweed on the shore. While the beach is declared closed in the winter, and it is not recommended to go in the water, this does not stop people from taking a swim. This has occasionally led to drownings in the area.

On average, the beach has got an amplitude of 1800 meters, and is notable for how sandy and rock-free it is in comparison to its neighbouring towns.

== Economy ==
While the town has seen extensive development since the 1930s, the 1980s to 1990s are widely regarded as the best years for tourism among the town's locals, with the town reportedly suffering from a slow steady decline in recent decades. Often leading to the town be named as one of the poorest areas on the island.

Speculation among the locals as to the cause of the slowdown ranges widely, from the introduction of the Euro currency in 1999 to the availability of cheap flights from companies like Ryanair and EasyJet to the ability of the average person to visit more diverse destinations, and most notably, the all-inclusive system, that grants the tourists access to unlimited food and drink at their hotels.

This caused some local restaurants and businesses to complain that the hotels have an unfair advantage, and a monopoly, as tourists are encouraged to get their food and drink from the hotel. This has led to calls for the system to be scrapped or outright outlawed. However, the real reason for the slowdown is unclear.

In recent years the economy has continued to decline after many hotels in the area were affected by the collapse of The Thomas Cook Group in 2019, and the lockdown measures imposed by the government to curb the spread of COVID-19 during the 2020 Corona Virus Pandemic. Since then, the town has seen the introduction of food banks in the area, as well as the closure of many shops, restaurants, and local businesses.

Regardless of this economic downturn, this has not stopped thousands of tourists from visiting the area each season, with the area and its hotels and attractions receiving many positive reviews on online travel sites.

At the end of each year, the town has a celebratory fireworks show, in honour of the tourists that visited the island that year.

== Politics ==
Cala Millor is currently governed by the left-wing socialist party PSOE, from the Son Servera town hall. by mayor Natalia Troya. PSOE is partnered with the UGT workers union, who have an office in town.

In 2022, the first socialist mayor of Cala Millor, Eduard Servera, died from COVID-19.
