= Son Servera =

- Municipality
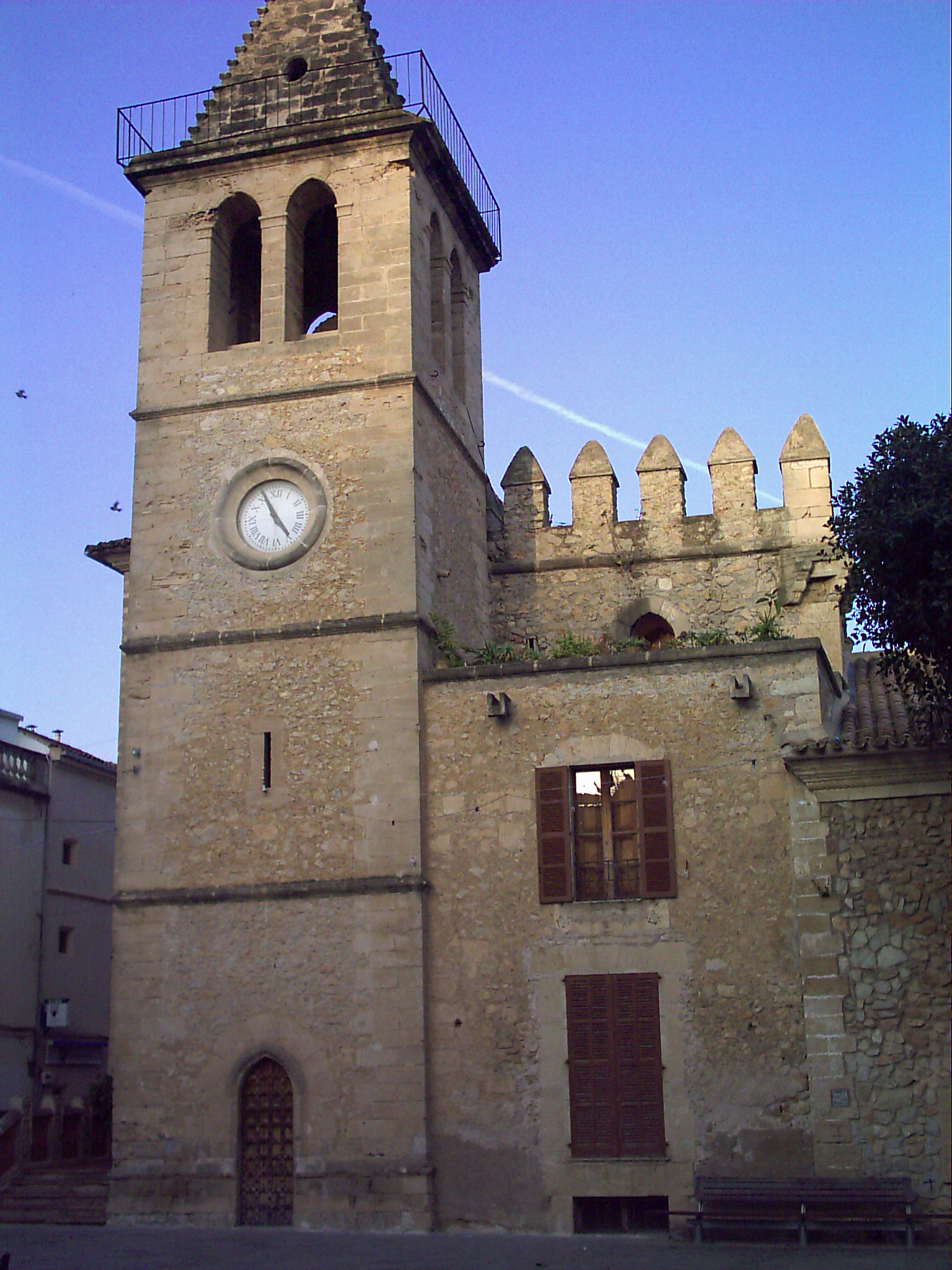
- Parish church of St. John the Baptist

- Coat of arms

- Map of Son Servera in Mallorca

- Location in Mallorca Son Servera (Balearic Islands) Son Servera (Spain)
- Coordinates: 39°37′15″N 3°21′36″E
- Country: Spain
- Autonomous community: Balearic Islands
- Province: Balearic Islands
- Comarca: Llevant
- Judicial district: Manacor

Government
  - Mayor: José Barrientos Ruiz (PSIB-PSOE)

Area
  - Total: 42.56 km^{2} (16.43 sq mi)
- Elevation: 103 m (338 ft)

Population (2025-01-01)
  - Total: 12,417
  - Density: 291.8/km^{2} (755.6/sq mi)
- Time zone: UTC+1 (CET)
  - Summer (DST): UTC+2 (CEST)
- Website: Official website

Son Servera (Balearic Catalan: [son səɾˈveɾə]) is a municipality in northeast Mallorca, in the Balearic Islands, Spain.

Founded in 1300 by James I of Aragon, in the lands of the Servera family, Son Servera was first documented in 1354 with the name of Benicanella, which would later become two towns: Son Fra Garí and Ca l'Hereu which would then become Son Servera. In 1814, king Ferdinand VII puts Son Servera municipality in Arta. In 1820, the population was struck by plague, but in 1934 the population reached 1,000 inhabitants and returned to the status of municipality.

With more than 10,000 inhabitants, Son Servera contains Cala Millor, a popular summer tourist area, with a large German community. Costa de los Pinos is a summer destination for Spanish high society.

Sant Joan is the patron saint of the town and is celebrated on 24 June with a fiesta. The fiesta runs for a week with a local fair, farmers market, agricultural stalls, and the local dancers perform traditional mallorquine dance of Ball de bot.

== Notable people ==
- Antonio Luna (born 1991), footballer
