= Alaró =

- Municipality and town
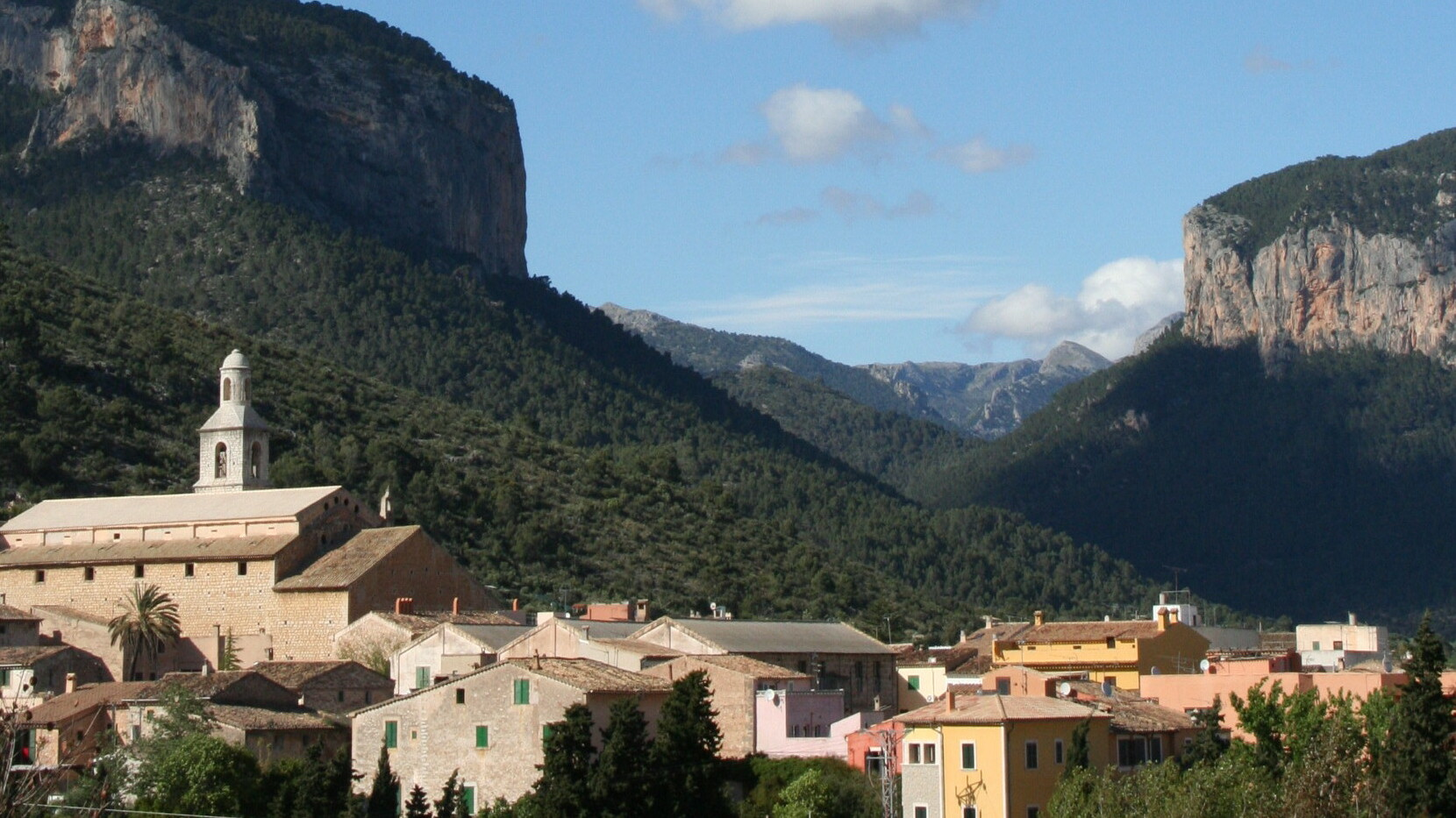

- Coat of arms

- Municipal location

- Location in Mallorca Alaró (Balearic Islands) Alaró (Spain)
- Coordinates: 39°42′24″N 2°47′27″E
- Country: Spain
- Autonomous community: Balearic Islands
- Province: Balearic Islands
- Island: Mallorca
- Comarca: Raiguer
- Judicial district: Inca

Government
  - Alcalde: Llorenç Perelló (2019) (PP)

Area
  - Total: 45.72 km^{2} (17.65 sq mi)
- Elevation: 252 m (827 ft)

Population (2025-01-01)
  - Total: 6,121
  - Density: 133.9/km^{2} (346.7/sq mi)
- Demonyms: Alaroner, alaronera
- Time zone: UTC+1 (CET)
  - Summer (DST): UTC+2 (CEST)
- Postal code: 07340
- Website: Official website

Alaró (Balearic Catalan: [ələˈɾo]) is a small municipality in the district of Raiguer on Mallorca, one of the Balearic Islands in Spain.

== History ==
Alaró's origin dates back to the Islamic period. The documented history begins in the thirteenth century, during the reconquest of Mallorca, with its Castell d'Alaró being the center of this. The Castell d'Alaró was built by Christian inhabitants to ward off invasions from pirates.

The town was the first to have an urban electricity network on the island. This event happened on August 15, 1901. Currently, electric distribution is unified with the rest of the island, but as a sign of how important it was for the island of Mallorca, on May 8, 2000, the Consell Insular de Mallorca marked the tower of the old factory as a monument of cultural interest.

== Geography ==
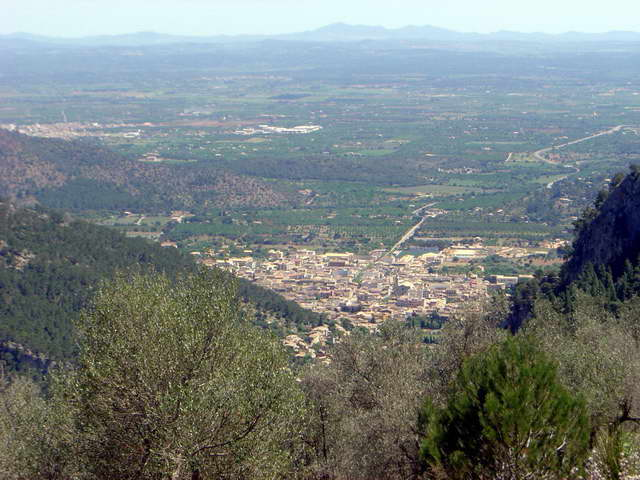
Alaró

Alaró is bounded by Buñola, Escorca, Lloseta, Mancor de la Vall, Binissalem, Consell and Santa María del Camí.

== Protected buildings in Alaró ==
Alaró has a catalog of properties which are protected because of their special characteristics.

== Country estates ==
The municipality's most characteristic image is that of the twin peaks, Castell and Álcadena, which inspired numerous legends about kings and witches. This is a landmark visible when entering the village from Consell. However it is also possible to reach Alaro by taking the secondary Ragieur road, the Santa Maria road or by way of Lloseta where there are more natural attractions

There are many country estates along these secondary roads, evidence of the rural economy that existed until the advent of tourism: Son Antelm and Son Fiol, on the Santa Maria road, Sa Teulera, on the Coanegegre-Alaro road, Son Penyaflor and Son Curt on the Castell road. Son Palou was an important family of the area. Manor Son Palou was their country estate. Son Forteza, Son Guitart and Son Grau are on the way to Lloseta.

== Economy ==
One of the most important economic activities in Alaró for years was the shoe industry. Alaró municipality once had up to 30 factories and more than 2000 people dedicated to this activity. Today, that industry has been reduced to a minimum, with only one major company in that sector. There were also important lignite mines, now closed, relevant to the activities of electricity generation and distribution. For some time they belonged to the electric company GESA (now part of the Endesa group).

Today, the town of Alaró, like many others on the island has become a commuter town, with most of its inhabitants working in the capital of the island (Palma de Mallorca).

== Notable people ==
- Óscar López, footballer (RCD Mallorca, Bolivia national team) (born 2006)

== See also ==
- List of municipalities in Balearic Islands
