= Campanet =

- Municipality and town
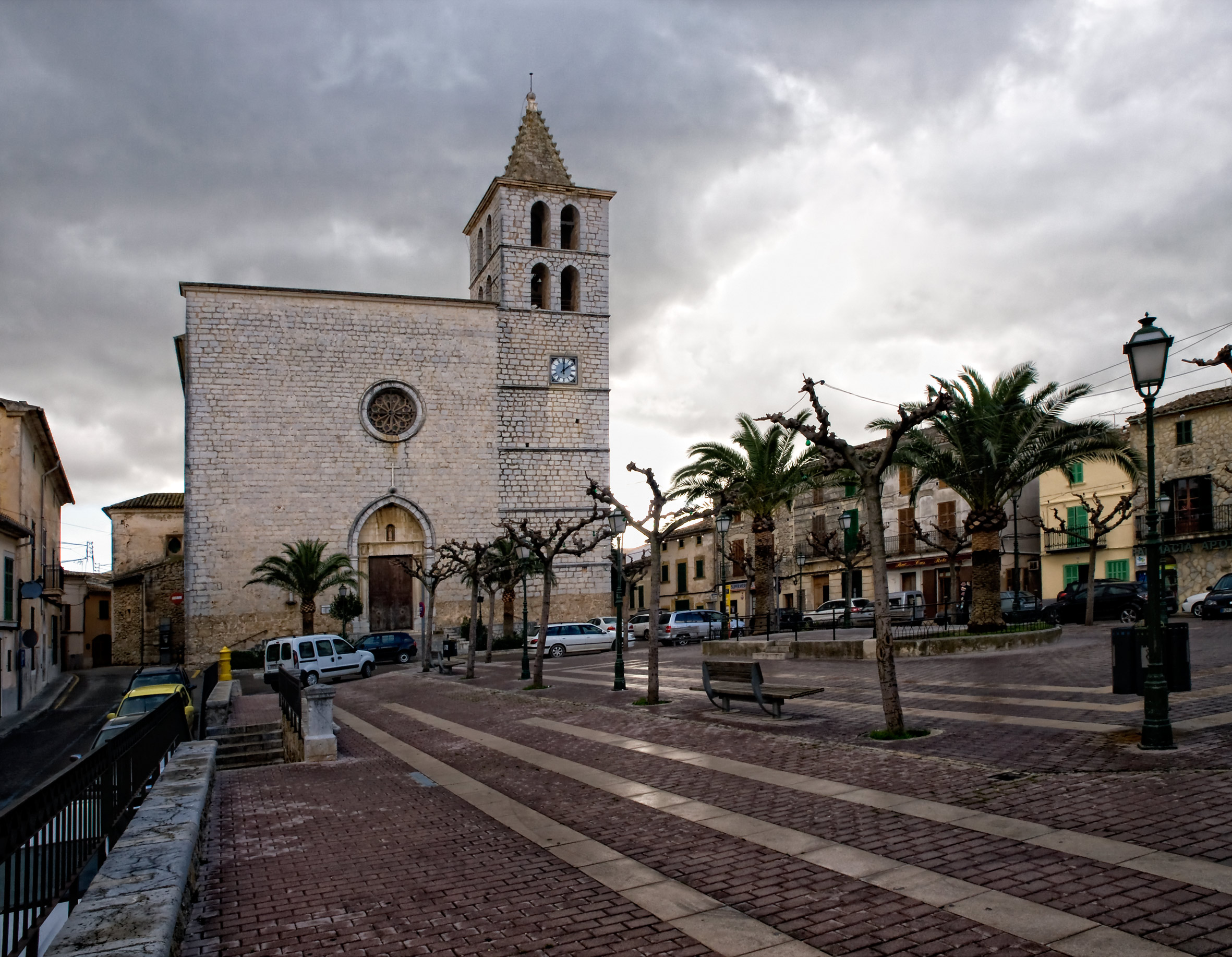
- Church in Campanet

- Coat of arms

- Municipal location

- Location of the town in Mallorca Campanet (Balearic Islands) Campanet (Spain)
- Coordinates: 39°46′30″N 2°57′58″E
- Country: Spain
- Autonomous Community: Balearic Islands
- Province: Balearic Islands
- Island: Mallorca
- Comarca: Raiguer

Government
  - Mayor (2023–): Guillem Rosselló Alcina

Area
  - Total: 34.65 km^{2} (13.38 sq mi)

Population (2025-01-01)
  - Total: 2,859
- Time zone: UTC+1 (CET)
  - Summer (DST): UTC+2 (CEST)

Campanet (Balearic Catalan: [kəmpəˈnət]) is a town situated in the northeast of Mallorca, Spain. The population was 2719 inhabitants in 2022. It is located close to Búger, Selva, Escorca, Sa Pobla, and Inca. The town is known for its caves and the Fonts Ufanes.

== See also ==
- List of municipalities in Balearic Islands
