= Bunyola =

- Municipality and town
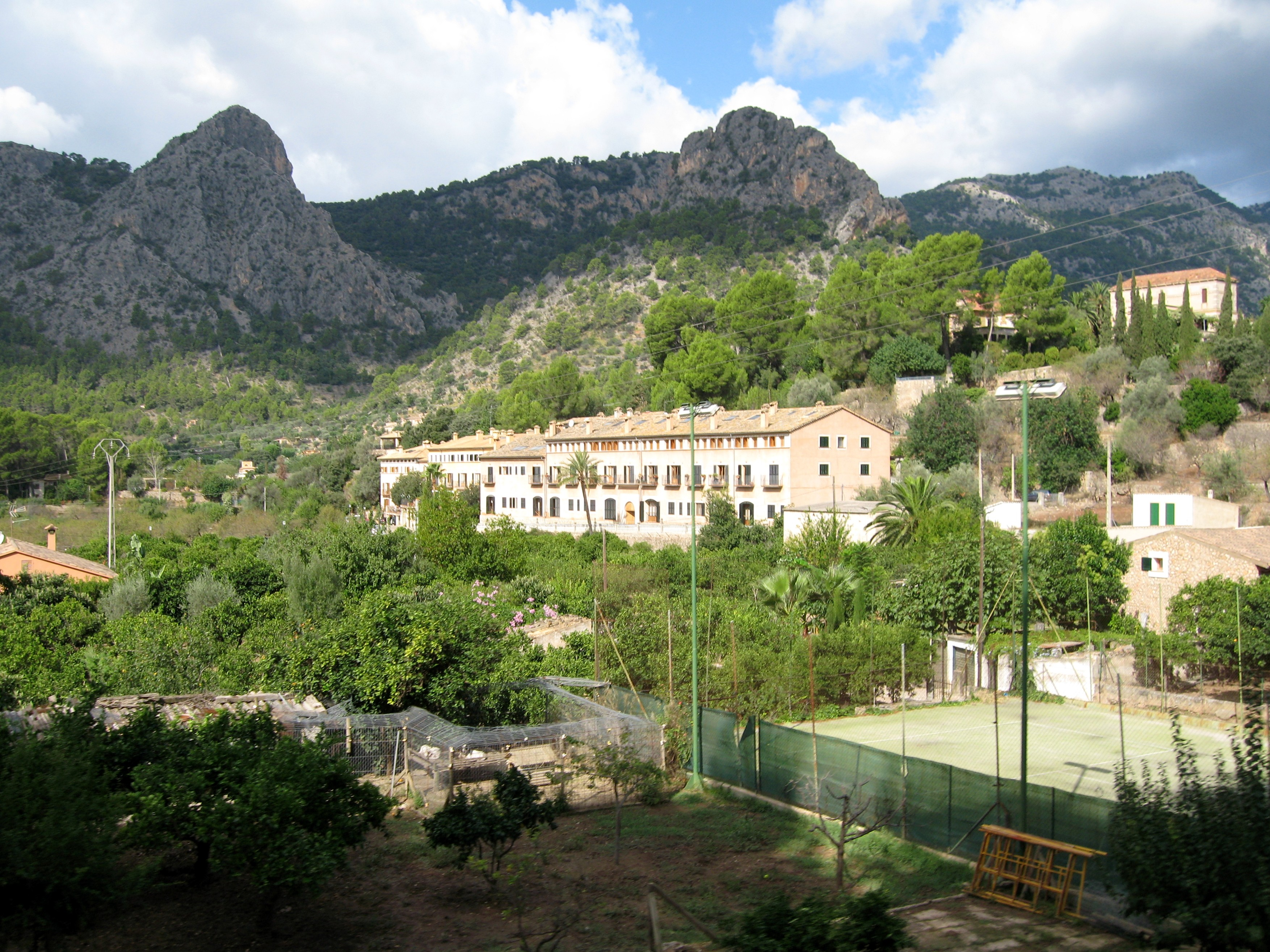

- Coat of arms

- Municipal location

- Location of the town in Mallorca Bunyola (Balearic Islands) Bunyola (Spain)
- Coordinates: 39°41′48″N 2°41′59″E
- Country: Spain
- Autonomous Community: Balearic Islands
- Province: Balearic Islands
- Island: Mallorca
- Comarca: Serra de Tramuntana

Government
  - Mayor (2015–): Andreu Bujosa Bestard

Area
  - Total: 32.7 sq mi (84.7 km^{2})
- Elevation: 790 ft (240 m)

Population (2025-01-01)
  - Total: 7,642
  - Density: 234/sq mi (90.2/km^{2})
- Time zone: UTC+1 (CET)
  - Summer (DST): UTC+2 (CEST)
- Postal code: 07110
- Website: http://www.ajbunyola.net/

Bunyola (Balearic Catalan: [buˈɲɔlə]) is a municipality of the island of Mallorca, Spain, located in the spurs of the Serra de Tramuntana, at a distance of 9 miles (14 km) from Palma. The municipality has an area of 32.67 square miles (84.6 km^{2}) and a population of 6,636 inhabitants,INE Instituto Nacional Estadística and the Ferrocarril de Sóller passes through it on the way to Palma. (INE 2018).

The municipality of Bunyola is located in the Comarca of Serra de Tramuntana, the Tramuntana Range was awarded World Heritage Status by UNESCO as an area of great physical and cultural significance. Bunyola borders with other municipalities of Palma de Mallorca, Marratxí, Santa Maria del Camí, Alaró, Escorca, Sóller, Deià and Valldemossa. Palmayola, Sa Font Seca y Orient are located within the municipality boundaries.

Celebration day of the patron saint, San Mateo, is on the 21st of September.

The Raixa Estate is located in Bunyola. It is a large Italian style villa surrounded by Pietro Lazzarini-designed gardens, and was used as the filming location for the 1982 film, Evil under the Sun. Once owned by the German designer Jil Sander, it was subsequently purchased by the Island Council of Mallorca. It reopened to visitors in late 2018.

== See also ==
- List of municipalities in Balearic Islands
