= Puig de Sant Miquel (Alaró) =

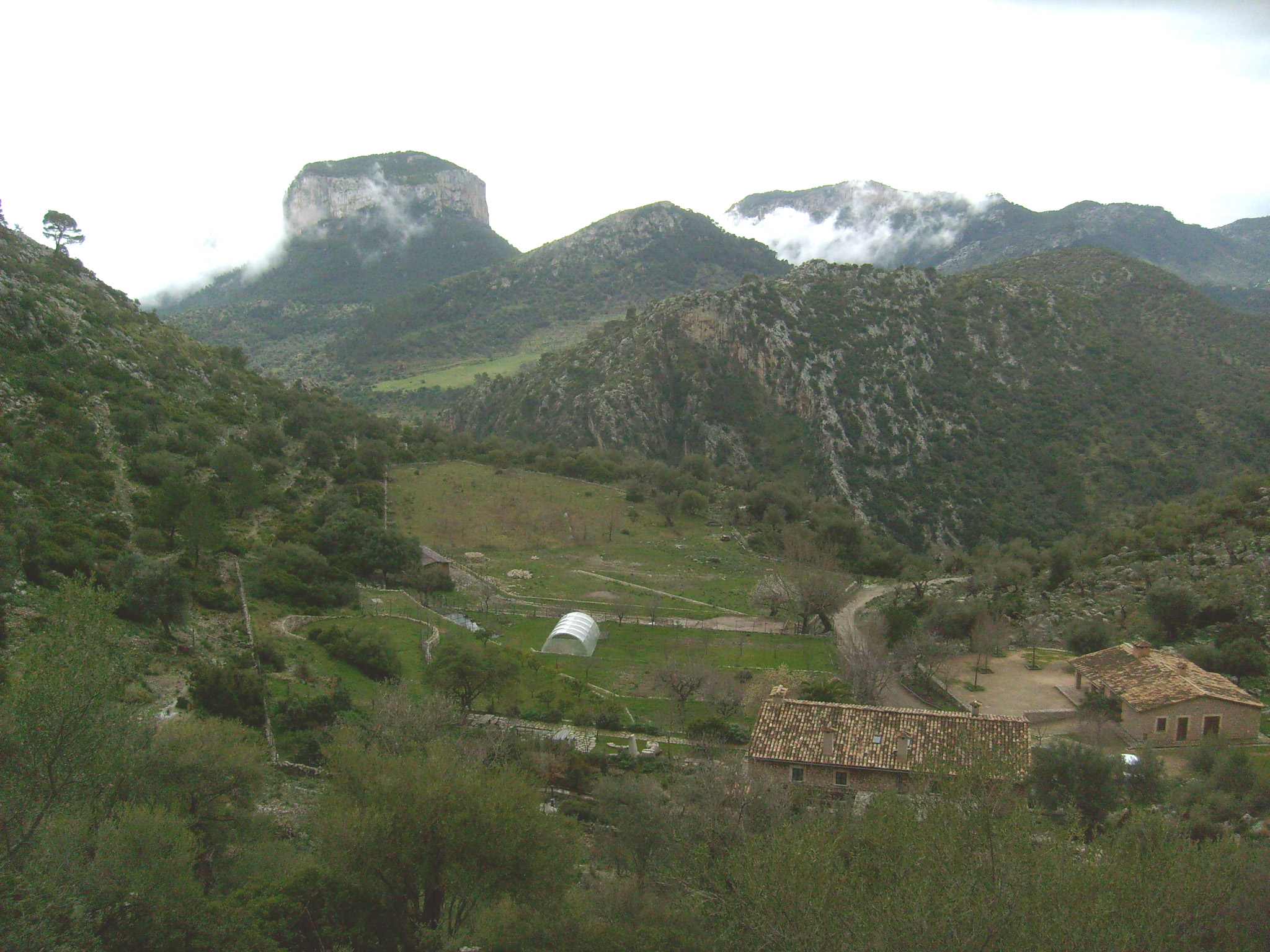
- View from Tossals Verds; the puig de Sant Miquel in the middle, and s'Alcadena at the left

Highest point
- Coordinates: 39°44′55″N 2°48′35″E

Geography
- Location within Mallorca Location within Spain
- Country: Spain
- Region: Majorca

Puig de Sant Miquel is a 661-metre (2,169 ft) mountain in the Serra de Tramuntana of Majorca. It is included in the municipality of Alaró of the autonomous community of the Balearic Islands. The Puig de Sant Miquel is located between s'Alcadena and the Finca Solleric, near the old path to Orient.
