= Cati Pol Martí =

Spanish volleyball player

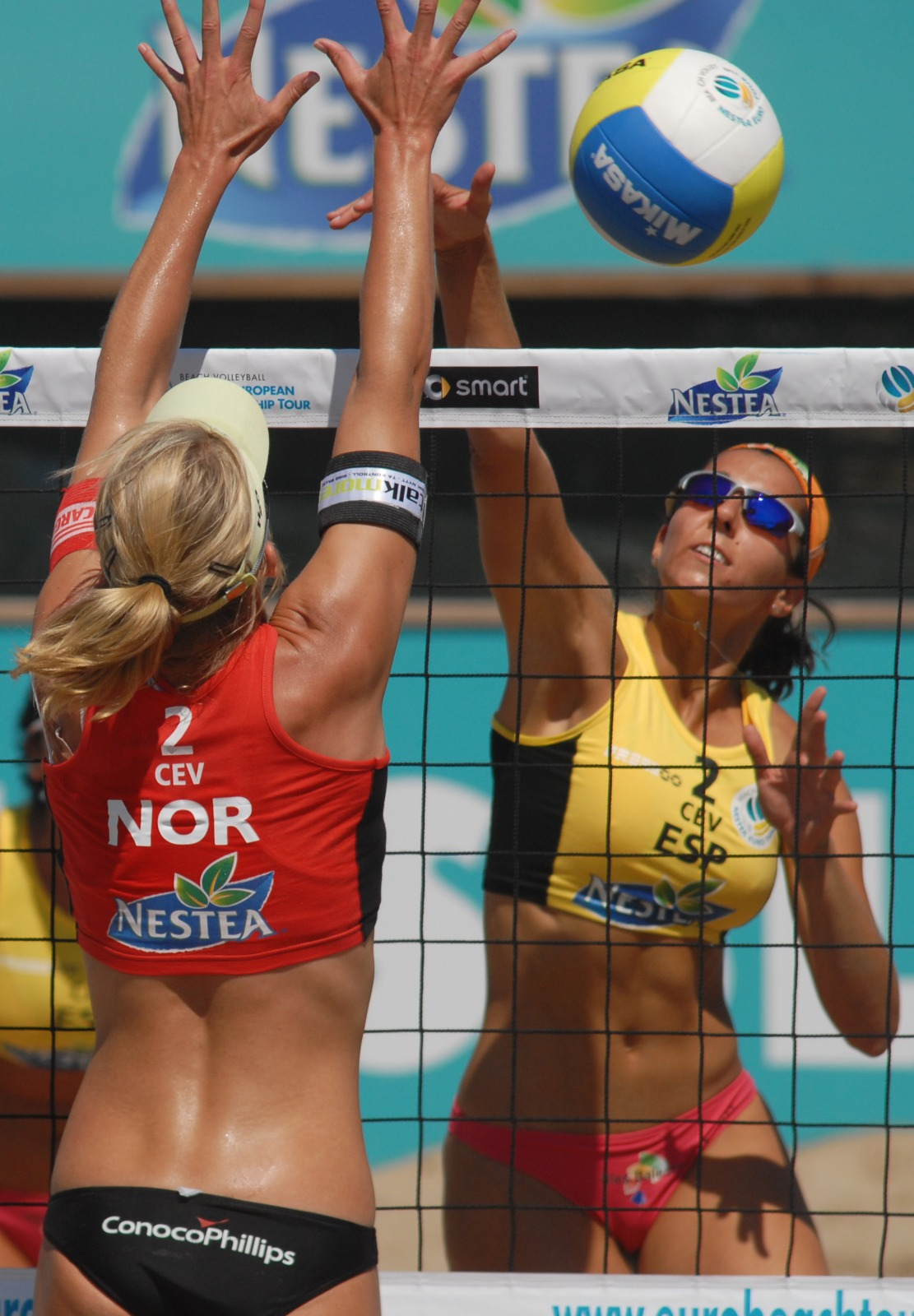

Personal information
- Full name: Catalina Maria Pol Martí
- Born: 30 October 1981 (age 43); Consell, Mallorca, Spain
- Height: 5 ft 9 in (175 cm)

Catalina Maria Pol Martí (born 30 October 1981, in Consell) is a Spanish volleyball and beach volleyball player.

== Career ==
She began practicing volleyball in 1994–95 season at CEIP Bartomeu Ordines, a school in her hometown. She subsequently played in CV Alaró and CV Algaida.

In 1999 she joined volleyball section of CN Sabadell and was part of the junior Catalan team, becoming the captain. The same season she was proclaimed Champion of Spain. In 2000 she signed for CV Barcelona and played three seasons in Division de Honor (current Superliga), the highest category of Spanish women's volleyball, until 2003.

Later, she returned to Mallorca and played again for CV Algaida (2004–05) of Division de Plata. In 2005 he signed for the Voley Ciutat Cide (Palma) in the same category, where he would spend the rest of his professional career, except for one stop between 2008 and 2010 for family reasons. In addition, since 2017 she became a coach-player of the same club, maintaining this role for three seasons.

However, he achieved his greatest successes in the beach volleyball modality, reaching 48 participations on the world circuit. She has played international tournaments since 2001 with various couples: Ester Ribera (2001), Ester Alcón (2002–04), Julia Mandaña (2005), Meritxell Alseda (2006-07) and Rocío Ruiz (2008). Upon returning to competition in 2013, she participated only in state tournaments with Cati Pol Borràs (2013-2016), Lauren Dickson (2017), Ester Ribera, Olga Matveeva and Amaranta Fernández (2018), and Aina Munar (2019).

In this last aspect she achieved international successes, especially the final of the 2005 Mediterranean Games with Julia Mandaña.

== Sports career ==
As a player

- CV Alaró
- CV Algaida
- CN Sabadell (1999-2000)
- CV Barcelona (2000-2003)
- CV Algaida (2004-2005)
- Voley Ciutat Cide (2005-2008, 2010–2017)

As a coach-player

- Voley Ciutat Cide (2017-2020)

== Acknowledgments ==
- The City Council of Consell approved that the municipal sports center would be officially inaugurated with the name of Pavelló Municipal Cati Pol, as because she is considered the most relevant sports figure in the municipality. It took place on 21 August 2005, during the town's patron saint festivities.
- Chosen by the Real Federación Española de Voleibol as best beach volleyball player in 2006.

== Honors ==
=== International championships ===
Beach volleyball
Bronze medal in the European Under 23 Championship (Esposende, 2001) (with Ester Ribera)
Silver medal in the Mediterranean Games (Almería, 2005) (with Julia Mandaña)

=== National championships ===
Beach volleyball
Gold medal in the Spanish A-2 Championship (Cambrils, 2004)
Silver medal in the Spanish Championship (Ayamonte, 2006)
Silver medal in the Spanish Championship (Laredo, 2007)
Bronze medal in the Spanish Championship (Fuengirola, 2016)
Semifinalist in the Spanish Championship (Fuengirola, 2019)
