= Fonts Ufanes =

Coordinates: 39°48′14″N 2°57′44″E

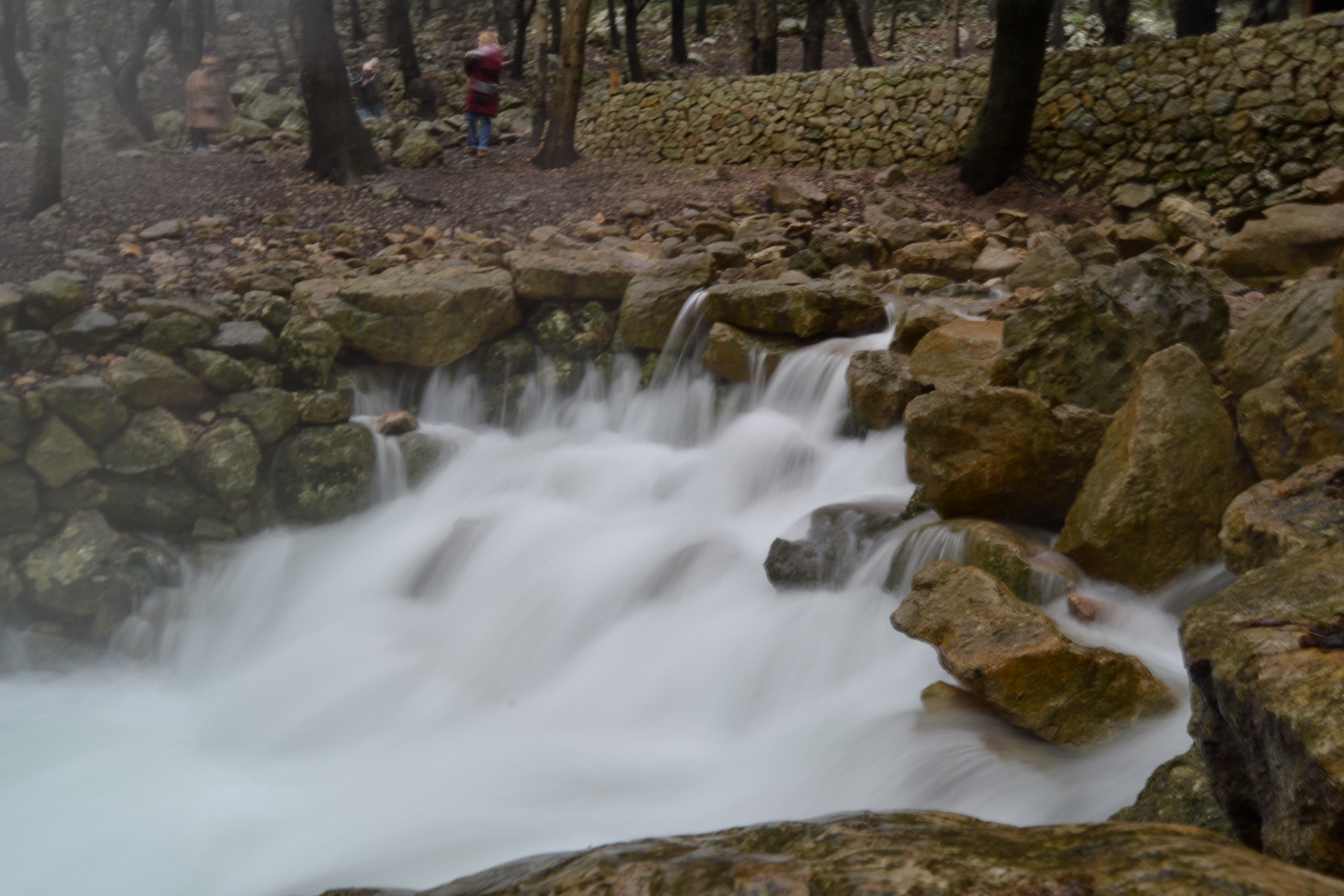
Fonts Ufanes

Fonts Ufanes is an intermittent spring located near the Sant Miquel hermitage, in Campanet municipality of the north of Mallorca. The underground water flows from the mountains (Puig Tomir) to Sant Miquel stream, which l'Albufera is the base level.

This spring is the main source of water of l'Albufera, an important natural reserve of the Balearic Islands.

== See also ==
- Serra de Tramuntana
