= Inca, Spain =

Inca
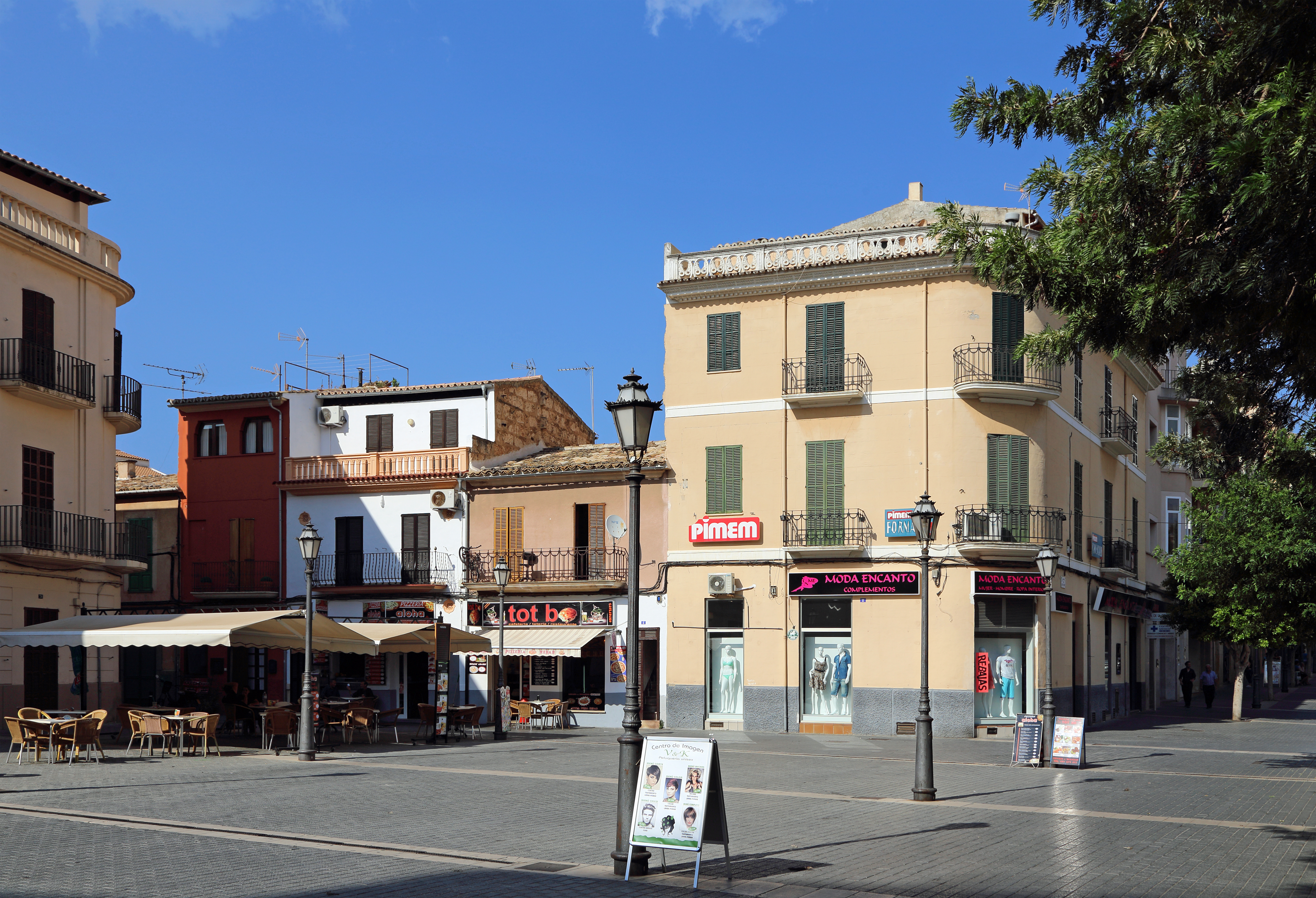

- Flag Coat of arms
- Nickname: Capital del Raiguer

- Location in Mallorca Inca (Balearic Islands) Inca (Spain)
- Coordinates: 39°43′N 2°55′E
- Country: Spain
- Autonomous community: Balearic Islands
- Province: Balearic Islands
- Comarca: Raiguer
- Judicial district: Inca

Government
  - Mayor: Virgílio Moreno (PSOE)
  - Deputy Mayor: Xisca García (INDI); Alicia Weber (MES)

Area
  - Metro: 58.34 km^{2} (22.53 sq mi)
- Elevation: 120 m (390 ft)

Population (2025-01-01)
  - City: 36,262
  - Density: 8.70/km^{2} (22.53/sq mi)
- CP: 07300
- Website: http://incaciutat.com/es/

Inca (Balearic Catalan: [ˈiŋkə]) is a town on the Spanish island of Mallorca. The population of the municipality is 32,137 (2018) in an area of 58.4 km^{2}.

There is a junction station on Mallorca's rail network with trains to Palma, the island's capital, to Sa Pobla, and to Manacor.

Inca is home of the footwear company "Camper".

Inca was known for its wine cellars. The town, like its neighboring municipality Binissalem, was a mass producer of wine from the 17th to 19th centuries when phylloxera destroyed the industry and its inhabitants turned to other activities such as tanning and leather craftsmanship. Many old wine cellars are being used as restaurants for serving traditional Mallorcan dishes like sopes mallorquines, tombet and gató d'ametlles.

== Twin towns – sister cities ==
Inca is twinned with:

- Lompoc, United States
- Telpaneca, Nicaragua
