= Miguel Martorell =

Spanish cyclist (1937–2021)

Personal information
- Born: 24 November 1937 Lloseta, Spain
- Died: 14 August 2021 (aged 83) Lloseta, Spain

Cycling career
- Sport: Cycling

Miguel Martorell (24 November 1937 – 14 August 2021) was a Spanish cyclist. He competed in the team pursuit at the 1960 Summer Olympics.
