= Track gauge in Spain =

Traditionally, the track gauge in Spain now managed by Adif, is 1,668 mm (5 ft 5 21/32 in), known as Iberian gauge. This gauge (originally 1,674mm but then reduced slightly to allow interoperability with Portugal) was decided upon by a Parliamentary committee, after a report known as the Informe Subercase (named for its principal author) in 1844. Spain has 11,791 km of track with this gauge.

Since 1992, all high-speed rail lines in Spain have been built to 1,435 mm (4 ft 8 1/2 in) standard gauge, providing direct connections without break-of-gauge with the French railway system. The high speed line that was projected to run from Madrid to Lisbon was also to have been built at this gauge.

A large metre gauge network also exists in the north of the country, linking Hendaye (in France) with León and Asturias. Some isolated metre-gauge railways also exist in Murcia, Catalonia and the Valencian Community. This was previously operated by FEVE (Ferrocarriles de Via Estrecha, Narrow Gauge Railways), but was taken over by Renfe in 2012.

The Madrid Metro is built to a gauge of 1,445mm, slightly wider than standard gauge.

The Barcelona Metro is built to standard gauge, except line 1, which was designed for through running of trains from the national network.

== Iberian gauge (1,668mm) ==
- Adif lines formerly belonging to Renfe
- Ferrocarrils de la Generalitat de Catalunya – line from Lleida to La Pobla de Segur (formerly owned by Renfe, transferred in 2005)
- Barcelona metro line 1 (this line is still built to the original gauge of 1,674mm, within engineering tolerances)

== Standard gauge (1,435mm) ==
- High-speed lines (LAVs) belonging to Adif
  - Madrid – Córdoba – Seville/Málaga
  - Madrid – Toledo
  - Madrid – Zaragoza – Barcelona – French border
  - Madrid – Valencia – Alicante/Alacant
  - Madrid – Valladolid – Leon
- Ferrocarrils de la Generalitat de Catalunya – lines from Barcelona to Terrassa and Sabadell
- Barcelona metro (all lines except line 1)

== Metre gauge (1,000mm) ==
- Lines formerly belonging to FEVE, including Euskotren Trena
  - Lines around Cartagena
  - Lines from Ferrol and León to Bilbao, San Sebastián and Hendaye
- Ferrocarrils de la Generalitat de Catalunya – line from Barcelona to Manresa and Igualada
- Ferrocarrils de la Generalitat Valenciana – including the Valencia metro system
- Renfe – Line C-9 of Cercanías Madrid, from Cercedilla to Cotos
- Serveis Ferroviaris de Mallorca

== Other gauges ==
- Ferrocarril de Sóller, Mallorca – 914mm
- Madrid Metro – 1,445mm

== See also ==
- Rail transport in Spain
