= Binissalem =

- Municipality and town
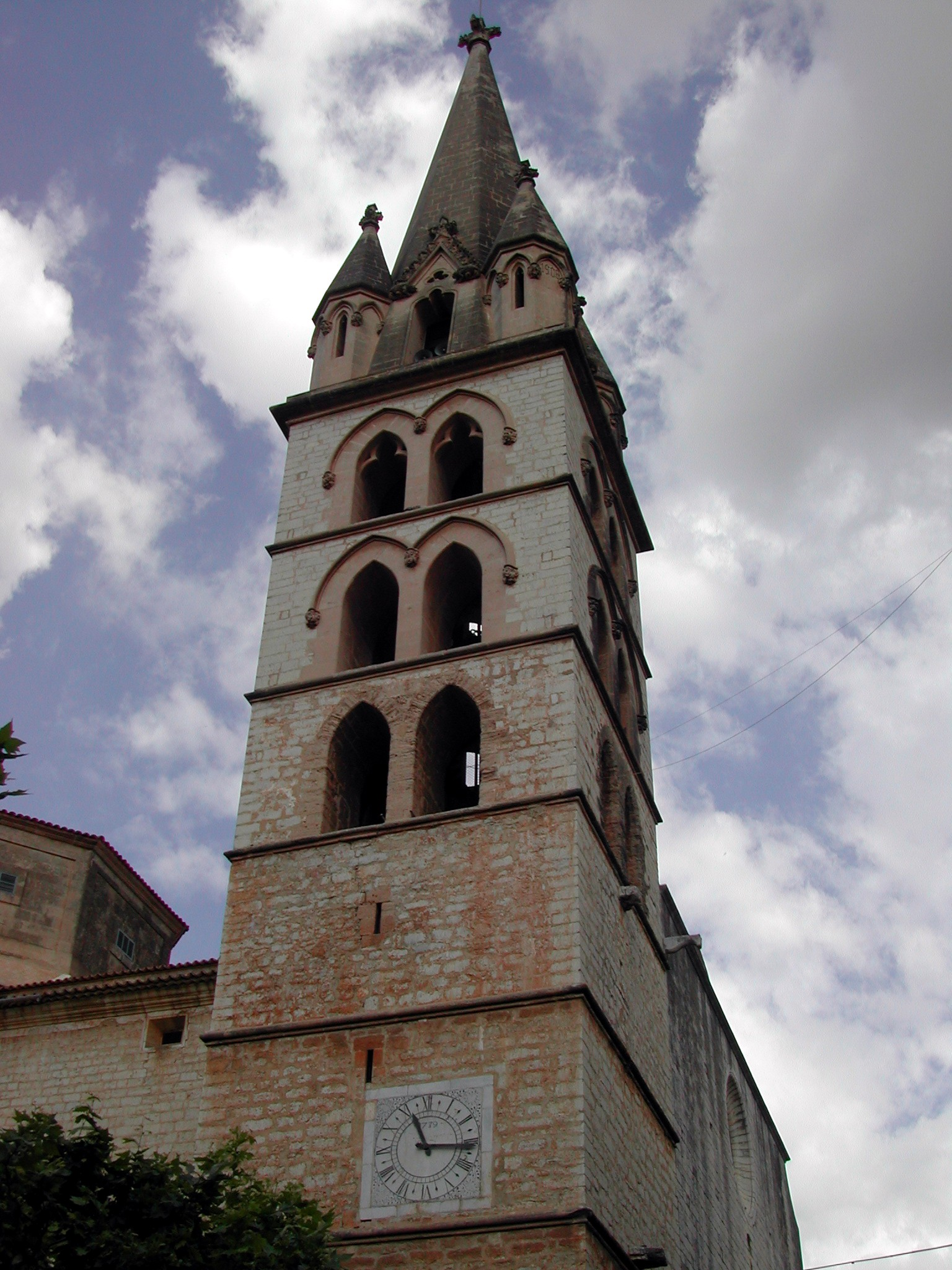

- Coat of arms

- Municipal location

- Location of the town in Mallorca Binissalem (Balearic Islands) Binissalem (Spain)
- Coordinates: 39°40′59″N 2°49′59″E
- Country: Spain
- Autonomous Community: Balearic Islands
- Province: Balearic Islands
- Island: Mallorca
- Comarca: Raiguer

Government
  - Mayor (2007–): Jeroni Salom Munar

Area
  - Total: 11.49 sq mi (29.77 km^{2})
- Elevation: 456 ft (139 m)

Population (2025-01-01)
  - Total: 9,350
  - Density: 813/sq mi (314/km^{2})
- Time zone: UTC+1 (CET)
  - Summer (DST): UTC+2 (CEST)

Binissalem (Balearic Catalan: [binisəˈlɛm]) is a municipality in the district of Raiguer on Mallorca, one of the Balearic Islands, Spain. It is the centre of the island's wine region of Binissalem DOP.

== Transport ==
Binissalem's railway station is served by frequent services from Palma to Inca and on to Sa Pobla and Manacor.

== Notable people ==
- Miguel Ángel Moyà (born 1984), footballer
- Alba Torrens (born 1989), basketball player

== See also ==
- List of municipalities in Balearic Islands
