= Raiguer =

Comarca in the Balearic Islands, Spain

Coordinates: 39°42′44″N 2°53′09″E

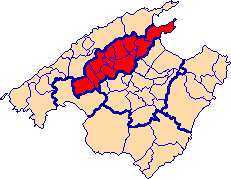
Location of Raiguer

Raiguer (Balearic Catalan: [rəjˈɣe], also [rəjˈʝe]; Catalan for "the foot of a mountain") is a comarca (county) located in the north-central part of Mallorca, one of the Balearic Islands. It runs parallel to the Serra de Tramuntana district from the town of Marratxí to the town of Sa Pobla. Like the rest of the Mallorcan districts, it is only recognized at a geographic level.

Raiguer includes the following municipalities:

- Alaró
- Alcúdia
- Binissalem
- Búger
- Campanet
- Consell
- Inca
- Lloseta
- Mancor de la Vall
- Marratxí
- Sa Pobla
- Santa Maria del Camí
- Selva
