= Son Bonet Aerodrome =

Son Bonet Airport Mallorca Airport
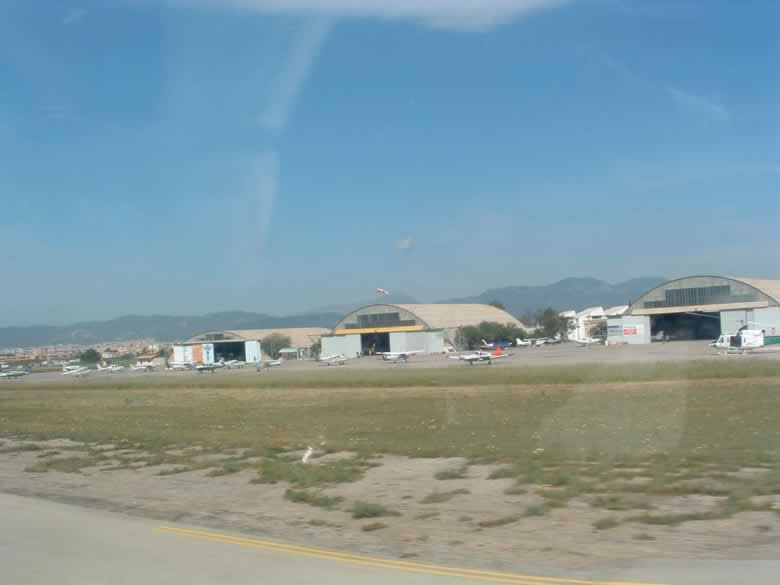
- IATA: SBO; ICAO: LESB

Summary
- Airport type: Public
- Operator: AENA
- Location: Palma de Mallorca, Spain
- Elevation AMSL: 154 ft (47 m)
- Coordinates: 39°35′56″N 02°42′10″E

Map
- Location within Spain

Runways
Direction	Length		Surface
Direction	ft	m	Surface
05/23	4,340	1,323	Asphalt

Son Bonet Aerodrome (Catalan: Aeròdrom de Son Bonet, Spanish: Aeródromo de Son Bonet) (ICAO: LESB) was the first civil airfield on Mallorca, Spain. Originally built during the 1920s as an alternative to the military airport at Son Sant Joan, the first commercial flight was in 1927 and a flying school established in 1935. The airfield is located in the Marratxí municipality between Pont d'Inca and Pla de Na Tesa, which is in close proximity to Palma (5½ km northeast from the town centre). During the Spanish Civil War it was adapted for both civilian and military purposes. The Italian air force briefly used the airport as one of their bases to launch bomber raids over the mainland.

During 1946, Son Bonet was equipped as a customs airport and opened to domestic and international traffic in July. Over the following decade, the airport traffic increased, which facilitated modernisation and improvements to be made. However, the airport could neither accommodate larger aircraft nor could the runway be extended, so these services were transferred to the island's main airport in July 1959. Today it is primarily used for general and leisure aviation, with approximately 75,000 flights per year.
