= Selva, Mallorca =

Selva
- Municipality
- Coat of arms

- Location within Mallorca

- Location in Mallorca Selva (Balearic Islands) Selva (Spain)
- Coordinates: 39°45′18″N 2°54′03″E
- Country: Spain
- Autonomous community: Balearic Islands
- Province: Balearic Islands
- Comarca: Raiguer

Area
  - Total: 48.75 km^{2} (18.82 sq mi)

Population (2025-01-01)
  - Total: 4,326
  - Density: 88.74/km^{2} (229.8/sq mi)
- Time zone: UTC+1 (CET)
  - Summer (DST): UTC+2 (CEST)

Selva (Balearic Catalan: [ˈsəlvə], locally [ˈsəwvə]) is a small municipality in the district of Raiguer on Mallorca, one of the Balearic Islands, Spain. The population is just over 4,000 people.
