= Mancor de la Vall =

- Municipality
- Coat of arms

- Location within Mallorca

- Location in Mallorca Mancor de la Vall (Balearic Islands) Mancor de la Vall (Spain)
- Coordinates: 39°44′59″N 2°52′18″E
- Country: Spain
- Autonomous community: Balearic Islands
- Province: Balearic Islands
- Comarca: Raiguer

Area
  - Total: 19.89 km^{2} (7.68 sq mi)

Population (2025-01-01)
  - Total: 1,692
  - Density: 85.07/km^{2} (220.3/sq mi)
- Time zone: UTC+1 (CET)
  - Summer (DST): UTC+2 (CEST)

Mancor de la Vall (Balearic Catalan: [mənˈkɔ ðə lə ˈvaʎ]) is a municipality in the district of Raiguer on Mallorca, one of the Balearic Islands, Spain. It had a population of 1321 people by 2013.
