= Lloseta =

- Municipality
- Coat of arms

- Location within Mallorca

- Location in Majllorca Lloseta (Balearic Islands) Lloseta (Spain)
- Coordinates: 39°43′N 2°52′E
- Country: Spain
- Autonomous community: Balearic Islands
- Province: Balearic Islands
- Comarca: Raiguer

Population (2025-01-01)
  - Total: 6,463
- Time zone: UTC+1 (CET)
  - Summer (DST): UTC+2 (CEST)

Lloseta (Balearic Catalan: [ʎoˈzətə], locally [ʎoˈzɛtə]) is a municipality in the district of Raiguer on Mallorca, one of the Balearic Islands, Spain. There is a theatre which showcases alternative music and traditional acts. Olympic cyclist Miguel Martorell was born here.
