= Búger =

Municipality and town in Balearic Islands, Spain

- Municipality and town
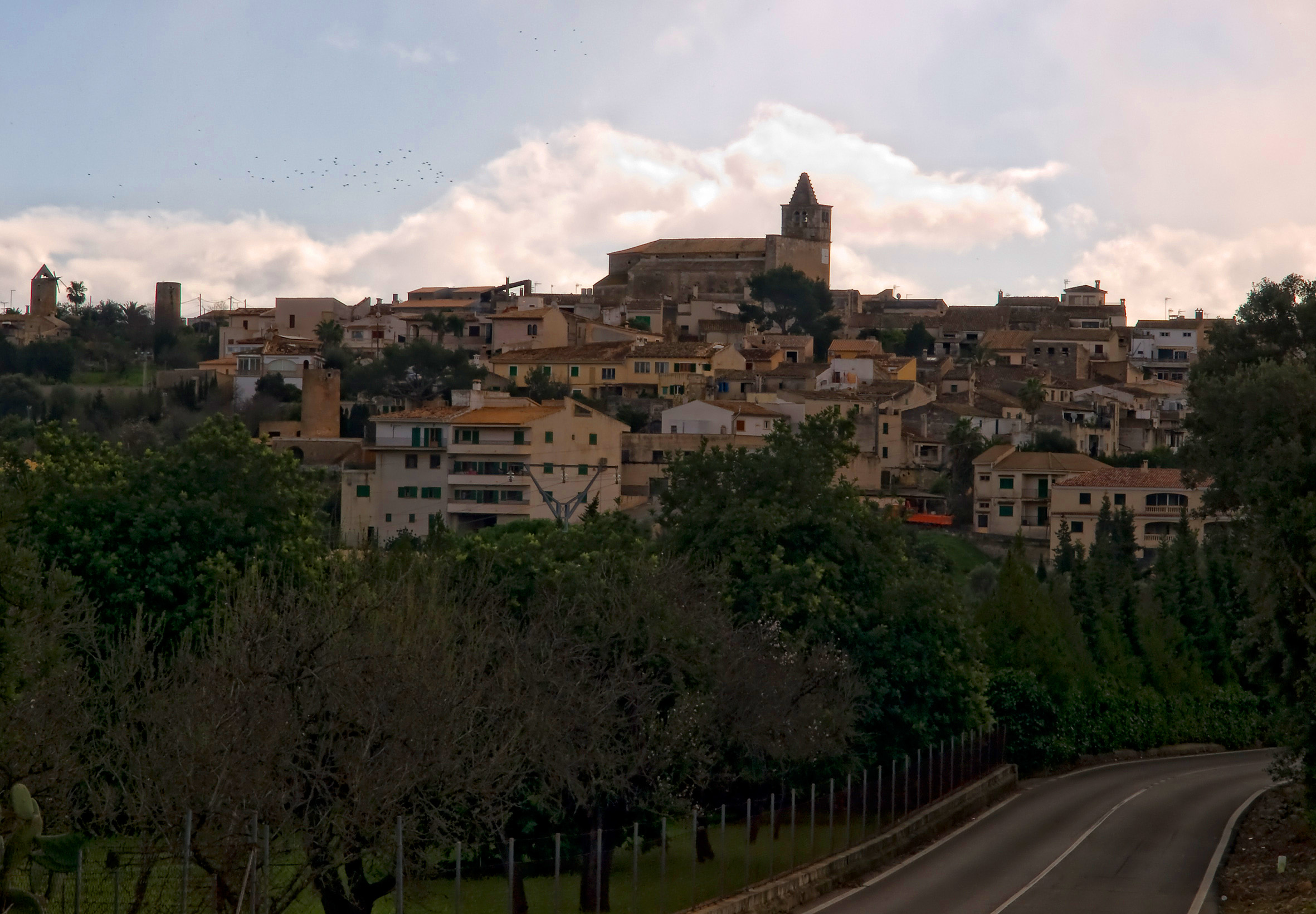

- Coat of arms

- Municipal location

- Location of the town in Mallorca Búger (Balearic Islands) Búger (Spain)
- Coordinates: 39°45′N 2°59′E
- Country: Spain
- Autonomous Community: Balearic Islands
- Province: Balearic Islands
- Island: Mallorca
- Comarca: Raiguer

Area
  - Total: 3.20 sq mi (8.29 km^{2})

Population (2025-01-01)
  - Total: 1,215
  - Density: 380/sq mi (147/km^{2})
- Time zone: UTC+1 (CET)
  - Summer (DST): UTC+2 (CEST)

Búger (Balearic Catalan: [ˈbuʒə]) is a municipality in the district of Raiguer on Mallorca, one of the Balearic Islands, Spain.

== See also ==
- List of municipalities in Balearic Islands
