= Marratxí =

- Municipality and town
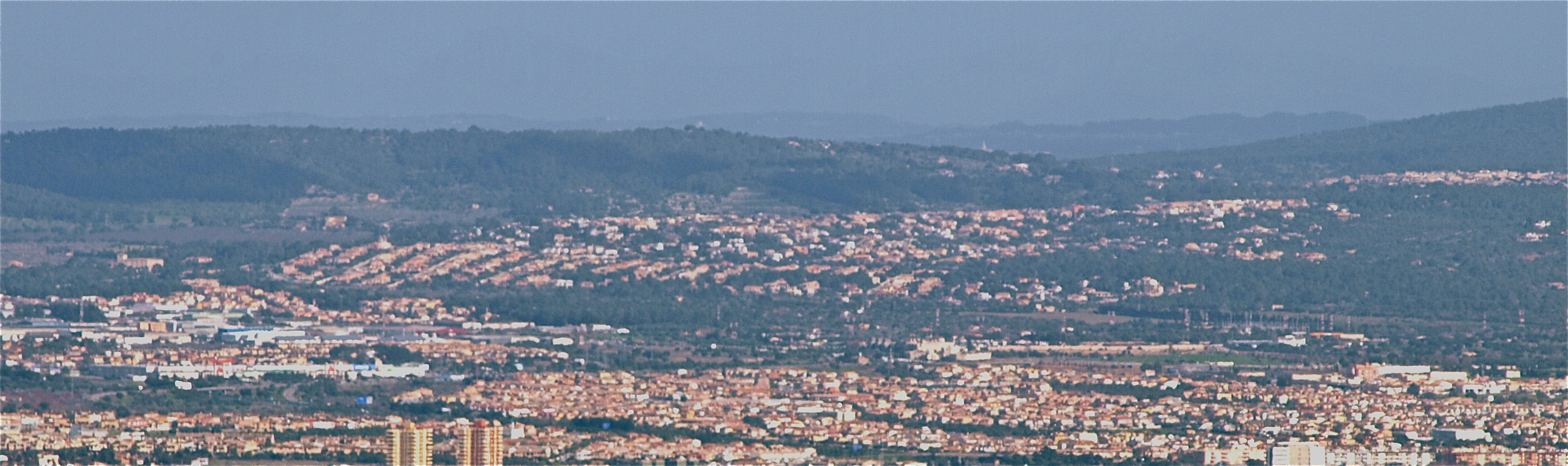

- Coat of arms

- Municipal location

- Location of the town in Mallorca Marratxí (Balearic Islands) Marratxí (Spain)
- Coordinates: 39°37′19″N 2°45′0″E
- Country: Spain
- Autonomous Community: Balearic Islands
- Province: Balearic Islands
- Island: Mallorca
- Comarca: Raiguer

Government
  - Mayor (from 2023): Jaume Llompart (PP)

Area
  - Total: 21 sq mi (54 km^{2})

Population (2025-01-01)
  - Total: 40,422
- Time zone: UTC+1 (CET)
  - Summer (DST): UTC+2 (CEST)

Marratxí (Balearic Catalan: [mərəˈtʃi]) is a municipality in the Raiguer region of Mallorca, one of the Balearic Islands of Spain. It has about 40,000 inhabitants and an area of 54 km^{2}. It is also a station on the Mallorca rail network. It became a municipality on 9 November 1932.

There is no central town in the municipality; instead, it is an agglomeration of the villages of Pont d'Inca (16,518), Pla de na Tesa (3,304), Pòrtol (2,640) and Sa Cabaneta (5,748) - where the district council buildings are located.

== Economy ==
The local economy is dominated by agriculture; however, significant employment is provided by traditional pottery manufacture and the large shopping complex at Pont d’Inca.

Marratxí's population has increased rapidly since the mid-1990s due to the proliferation of new developments around the historical villages, since the municipality has good road—and to a lesser extent rail—links to nearby Palma.

== Notable landmarks ==
Marratxí Church dates to the early 18th century, built during the Cotoner era. The Caulles Festival Park lies to the south.

The first civil airfield on Majorca was Aeródromo de Son Bonet, which is located between Pont d’Inca and Pla de Na Tesa.

== Notable people ==
- Cata Coll (born 2001), goalkeeper for Barcelona and the Spain national team
