= Santa Maria del Camí =

- Municipality
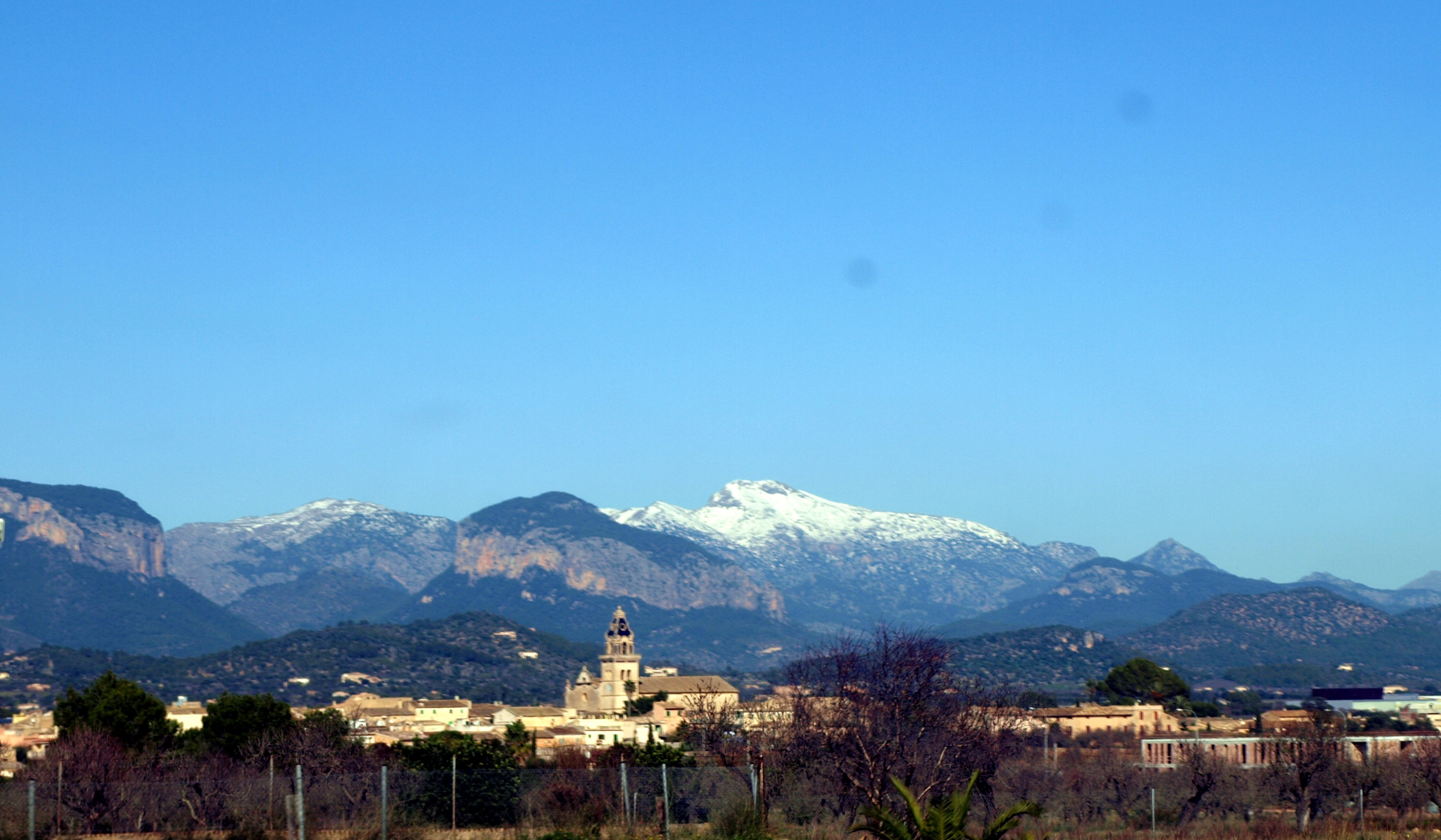
- Santa Maria del Camí and Puig de Massanella

- Coat of arms

- Location of Santa Maria del Camí in Mallorca

- Location in Mallorca Santa Maria del Camí (Balearic Islands) Santa Maria del Camí (Spain)
- Coordinates: 39°39′4″N 2°46′23″E
- Country: Spain
- Autonomous community: Balearic Islands
- Province: Balearic Islands
- Comarca: Raiguer
- Judicial district: Palma de Mallorca

Government
  - Mayor: María Rosa Vich Vich

Area
  - Total: 37.62 km^{2} (14.53 sq mi)
- Elevation: 132 m (433 ft)

Population (2025-01-01)
  - Total: 7,744
  - Density: 205.8/km^{2} (533.1/sq mi)
- Demonym: Santamariers
- Time zone: UTC+1 (CET)
  - Summer (DST): UTC+2 (CEST)
- Postal code: 07320

Santa Maria del Camí (Balearic Catalan: [səntə məˈɾi.ə ðəl kəˈmi], also [səntə məˈɾi.ə ðəl cəˈmi]) is a municipality in the Comarca of Raiguer on Mallorca, one of the Balearic Islands, Spain. It is located about 17km north east of the island's capital, Palma de Mallorca. Santa Maria del Camí was an important stop along the Camí Reial, which linked Palma with Inca and other towns in the region. This heritage is visible in the town's medieval architecture and the preserved stone streets. The central square, Plaça de la Vila, is a focal point with buildings dating back to the 17th century, including the historic Town Hall and the Santa Maria Church, a landmark established in the 13th century.
