= Balearic Islands =

Spanish archipelago in the Mediterranean

Balearic Islands (Note: Pronunciation English: /ˌbæliˈærɪk/ BAL-ee-ARR-ik or /bəˈlɪərɪk/ bə-LEER-ik Catalan: Illes Balears Balearic Catalan pronunciation: [ˈiʎəz bəleˈas] Spanish: Islas Baleares Spanish pronunciation: [ˈislas βaleˈaɾes]) Illes Balears (Catalan) Islas Baleares (Spanish)
- Autonomous community and province
- Flag Coat of arms
- Anthem: La Balanguera
- Location of the Balearic Islands in Spain
- Interactive map of Balearic Islands
- Coordinates: 39°30′N 3°00′E
- Country: Spain
- Formation: Main events: 1276 (Kingdom of Mallorca); 1715 (Nova Planta); 1833 (Regionalization); 1983 (Autonomous community)
- Statute(s) of Autonomy: Statute(s): 1983 (First Statute); 2007 (Second Statute)
- Capital (and largest city): Palma
- Province(s): Balearic Islands

Government
  - Type: Devolved government in a constitutional monarchy
  - Body: Govern de les Illes Balears
  - President: Marga Prohens (PP)
  - Speaker: Gabriel Le Senne (Vox)
  - Legislature: Parliament of the Balearic Islands

Area
  - Total: 4,991.70 km^{2} (1,927.31 sq mi)
  - Rank: 17th in Spain
- 1.0% of Spain

Population (2025)
  - Total: 1,249,844
  - Rank: 12th in Spain
  - Density: 250.384/km^{2} (648.493/sq mi)
- 2.5% of Spain
- Demonyms: Balearic • balear; baleàric, -a (Cat.) • balear, baleárico/a (Sp.)
- Official language(s): Catalan; Spanish

GDP
  - Total: €44.693 billion (2024)
  - Per capita: €35,783 (2024)

HDI
  - HDI (2022): 0.879 (very high · 14th)
- Time zone: UTC+1 (CET)
  - Summer (DST): UTC+2 (CEST)
- Postal code prefixes: 07XXX (IB)
- Telephone code: +34 971
- ISO 3166 code: ES-IB
- Currency: Euro (€) (EUR)
- Official holiday: March 1
- Website: caib.es

The Balearic Islands are an archipelago in the western Mediterranean Sea, off the eastern coast of the Iberian Peninsula, constituting an autonomous community and province of Spain, with Palma as their capital and largest city. With a population of 1,249,844, they are the 6th least populous autonomous community of Spain, and with an area of 4,991.70 square kilometres (1,927.31 sq mi), the smallest.

Historically part of the Kingdom of Majorca, the archipelago was established as a Spanish province and historic region in the 19th century and achieved self-government under its Statute of Autonomy in 1983. In the 2007 statute reform, the autonomous community of the Balearic Islands was defined as a "nationality" of Spain. The co-official languages are Catalan and Spanish.

The archipelago is divided into two main groups: the western Pityusic Islands (comprising Ibiza, Formentera, and smaller surrounding islets) and the eastern Gymnesian Islands (principally Mallorca and Menorca). Notable minor islands include Cabrera, Dragonera, and S'Espalmador. The Balearic Islands form the second most populous and second-largest archipelago in Spain, after the Canary Islands.

The region experiences a Mediterranean climate, and the four principal islands are major international tourist destinations. Ibiza has developed a prominent electronic music and nightlife industry, attracting internationally touring DJs to its nightclubs.

== Etymology ==
The islands are called in Catalan Illes Balears, and in Spanish Islas Baleares.

The ancient Greeks usually used local place names, but they called the islands Γυμνησίαι/Gymnesiai. No record of the native name survives, but the Carthaginians called them Βαλεαρεῖς, and the Romans Baleares.

The term Balearic may derive from Greek (Γυμνησίαι/Gymnesiae and Βαλλιαρεῖς/Balliareis). In Latin, it was Baleares.

Classical sources give two theories for the origins of Gymnasiae and Baleares. According to Lycophron's Alexandra verses, the islands were called Γυμνησίαι/Gymnesiae (γυμνός/gymnos, meaning 'naked' in Greek) because the inhabitants were often nude in the balmy climate. But Strabo thought that Gymnesiai probably referred to the light equipment used by Balearic troops γυμνῆται/gymnetae.

Most ancient Greek and Roman writers thought the name of the people, (βαλεαρεῖς/baleareis, from βάλλω/ballo, meaning 'to launch'), came from their skill as slingers, but Strabo thought the name was of Phoenician origin. He observed that it was the Phoenician word for lightly armoured soldiers, which the ancient Greeks called γυμνῆτας/gymnetas. The root bal suggests a Phoenician origin; in Volume III, Book XIV of his Geography, Strabo suggests that the name comes from the Phoenician balearides.

== History ==
=== Ancient history ===
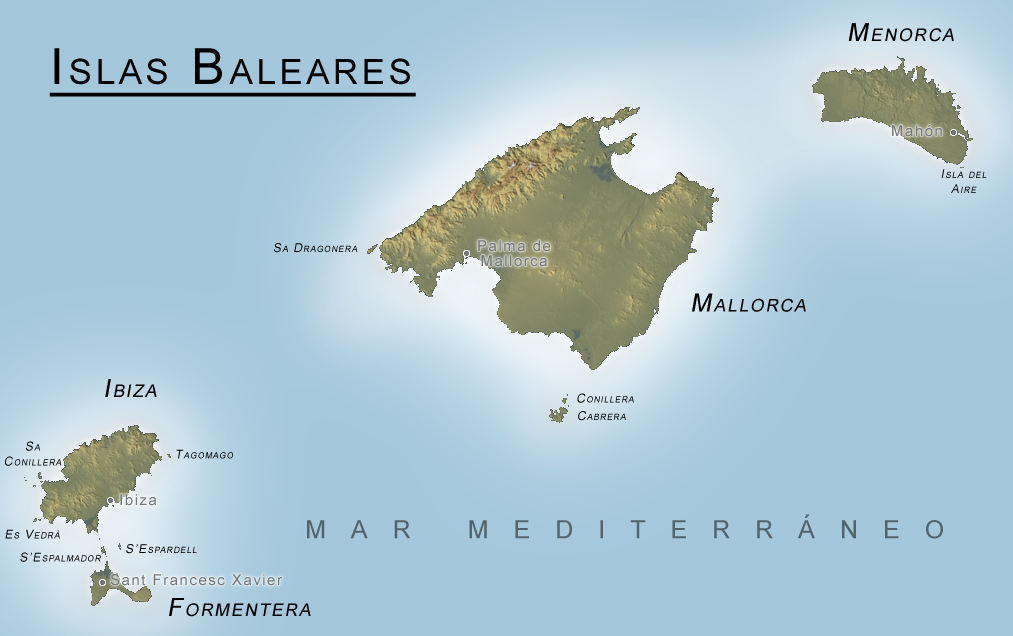
Map of the Balearic Islands, c. 2006

The earliest known evidence of habitation of the Balearic Islands dates to the 3rd millennium BC (around 2500–2300 BC) from the Iberian Peninsula or southern France, by people associated with the Bell Beaker culture.

Little is recorded about the inhabitants of the islands during classical antiquity, though many legends exist. The story, preserved by Lycophron, that certain shipwrecked Greek Boeotians were cast nude on the islands, was evidently invented to account for the name Gymnesiae (Ancient Greek: Γυμνήσιαι). In addition, Diodorus Siculus writes that the Greeks called the islands Gymnesiae because the inhabitants were naked (γυμνοί) during summer. Also, a tradition holds that the islands were colonized by Rhodes after the Trojan War.

Some stories describe them as having unusual habits. For instance, some accounts state that the inhabitants lived in hollow rocks and artificial caves, that their men were remarkable for their love of women and would trade three or four men to ransom one woman, that they had no gold or silver coin, and forbade the importation of the precious metals—so that those of them who served as mercenaries took their pay in wine and women instead of money. The Roman Diodorus Siculus described their marriage and funeral customs (v. 18 book 6 chapter 5), noting that Roman observers found those customs peculiar.

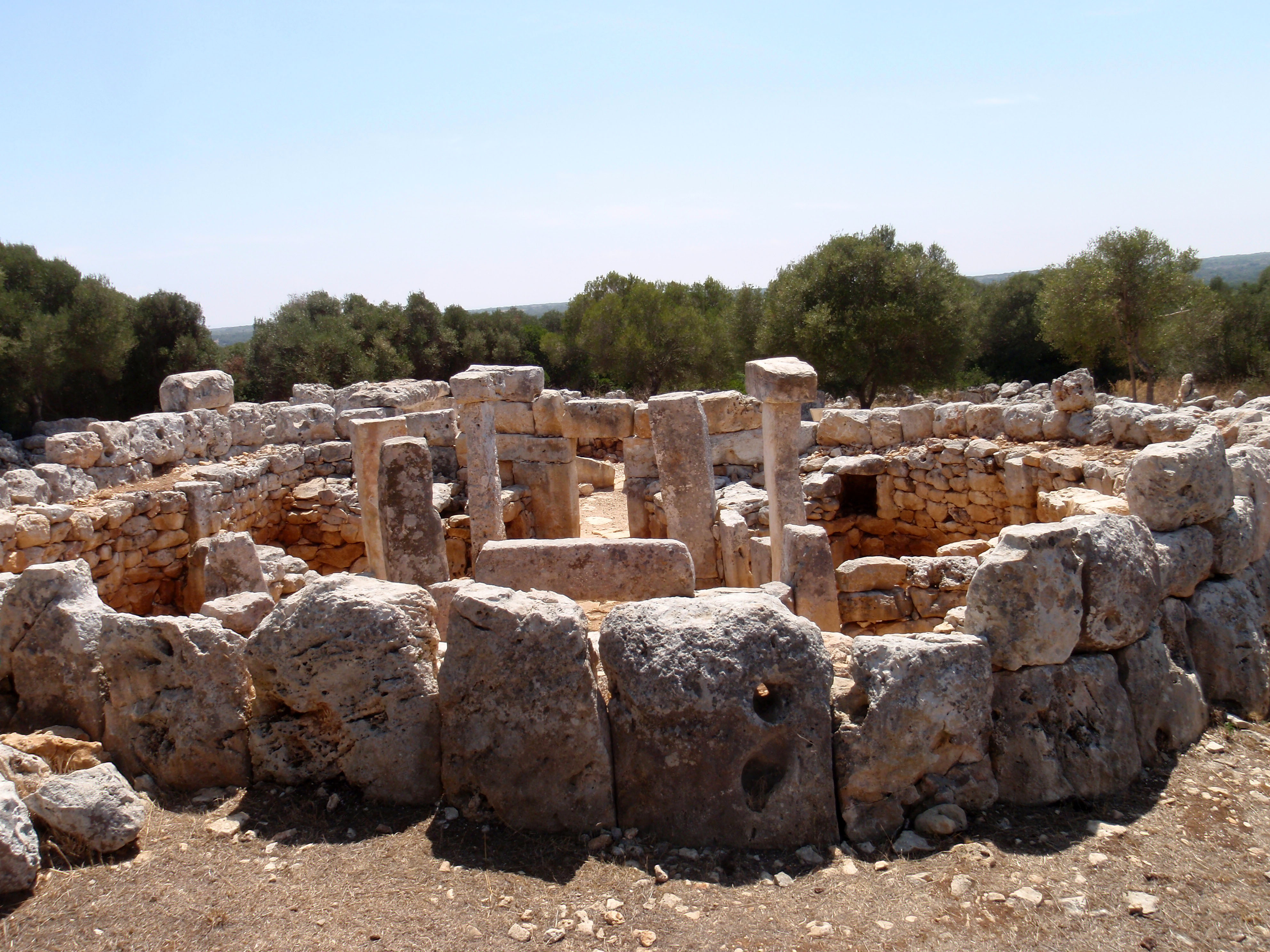
Torre d'en Galmés, 2011

In ancient times, the islanders of the Gymnesian Islands (Illes Gimnèsies) constructed talayots, and were famous for their skill with slings. As slingers, they served as mercenaries, first under the Carthaginians, and later under the Romans. They went into battle ungirt, with only a small buckler, and a javelin burnt at the end, and in some cases tipped with a small iron point; but their effective weapons were their slings, of which each man carried three, wound round his head (Strabo p. 168; Eustath.), or, as seen in other sources, one round the head, one round the body, and one in the hand. (Diodorus) The three slings were of different lengths, for stones of different sizes; the largest they hurled with as much force as if it were flung from a catapult; and they seldom missed their mark. To this exercise, they were trained from infancy, in order to earn their livelihood as mercenary soldiers. It is said that the mothers allowed their children to eat bread only when they had struck it off a post with the sling.

The Phoenicians took possession of the islands in very early times; a remarkable trace of their colonisation is preserved in the town of Mago (Mahón in Menorca). After the fall of Carthage in 146 BC, the islands seem to have been virtually independent. Notwithstanding their celebrity in war, the people were generally very quiet and inoffensive. The Romans, however, easily found a pretext for charging them with complicity with the Mediterranean pirates, and they were conquered by Q. Caecilius Metellus, who was subsequently given the surname Balearicus, in 123 BC. Metellus settled 3,000 Roman and Hispanic colonists on the larger island, and founded the cities of Palma and Pollentia.

The islands belonged, under the Roman Empire, to the conventus of Carthago Nova (modern Cartagena), in the province of Hispania Tarraconensis, of which province they formed the fourth district, under the government of a praefectus pro legato. An inscription of the time of Nero mentions the PRAEF. PRAE LEGATO INSULAR. BALIARUM. (Orelli, No. 732, who, with Muratori, reads pro for prae.) They were afterwards made a separate province, called Hispania Balearica, probably in the division of the empire under Constantine.

The two largest islands (the Balearic Islands, in their historical sense) had numerous excellent harbours, though rocky at their mouth, and requiring care in entering them (Strabo, Eustath.; Port Mahon is one of the finest harbours in the world). Both were extremely fertile, except for wine and olive oil production. They were celebrated for their cattle, especially for the mules of the lesser island; they had an immense number of rabbits, and were free from all venomous reptiles. Amongst the snails valued by the Romans as food was a species from the Balearic Isles called cavaticae because they were bred in caves. Their chief mineral product was the red earth, called sinope, which was used by painters. Their resin and pitch are mentioned by Dioscorides. Diodorus gives the population of the two islands as 30,000.

The part of the Mediterranean east of Spain, around the Balearic Isles, was called Mare Balearicum, or Sinus Balearicus.

=== Medieval period ===
==== Late Roman and early Islamic eras ====
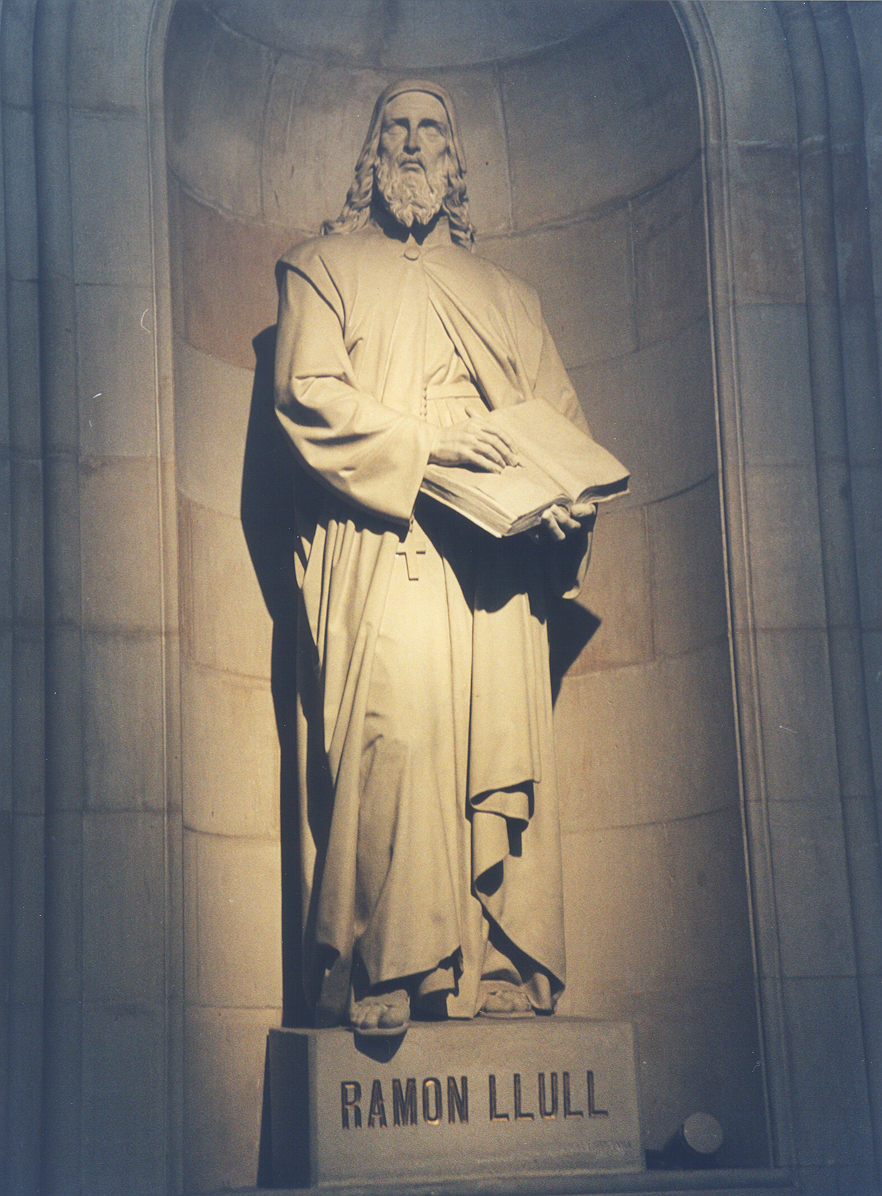
Ramon Llull

The Vandals under Genseric conquered the islands sometime between 461 and 468 during their war on the Roman Empire. However, in late 533 or early 534, following the Battle of Ad Decimum, the troops of Belisarius reestablished control of the islands for the Romans. Imperial power declined rapidly in the western Mediterranean after the fall of Carthage and the Exarchate of Africa to the Umayyad Caliphate in 698, and in 707 the islands submitted to the terms of an Umayyad fleet, which allowed the residents to maintain their traditions and religion as well as a high degree of autonomy. Now nominally both Byzantine and Umayyad, the de facto independent islands occupied a strategic and profitable grey area between the competing religions and kingdoms of the western Mediterranean. The prosperous islands were thoroughly sacked by the Swedish Viking King Björn Ironside and his brother Hastein during their Mediterranean raid of 859–862.

The heavy use of the islands as a pirate base provoked the Emirate of Córdoba, nominally the island's overlords, to invade and incorporate the islands into their state. In 903, the Muslims under the Arab commander Issam al-Khawlani defeated the Franks and captured the Balearic Islands.

Later, the Cordoban emirate disintegrated in civil war and partition in the early eleventh century, breaking into smaller states called taifas. Mujahid al-Siqlabi, the ruler of the Taifa of Dénia, sent a fleet and seized control of the islands in 1015, using it as the base for subsequent expeditions to Sardinia and Pisa. In 1050, the islands' governor Abd Allah ibn Aglab rebelled and established the independent Taifa of Mallorca.

==== The Crusade against the Balearics ====
Catalan Atlas, by the sefardi Cresques Abraham

For centuries, the Balearic sailors and pirates had been masters of the western Mediterranean. But the expanding influence of the Italian maritime republics and the shift in power on the Iberian Peninsula from the Muslim states to the Christian states left the islands vulnerable. A crusade was launched in 1113. Led by Ugo da Parlascio Ebriaco and Archbishop Pietro Moriconi of the Republic of Pisa, the expedition included 420 ships, a large army and a personal envoy from Pope Paschal II. In addition to the Pisans (who had been promised suzerainty over the islands by the Pope), the expedition included forces from the Italian cities of Florence, Lucca, Pistoia, Rome, Siena, and Volterra, from Sardinia and Corsica. Catalan forces under Ramon Berenguer, Hug II of Empúries, and Ramon Folc II of Cardona came from the Iberian peninsula and Occitan forces under William V of Montpellier, Aimery II of Narbonne, and Raymond I of Baux came from France. The expedition also received strong support from Constantine I of Logudoro and his base of Porto Torres.

The crusade sacked Palma in 1115 and caused widespread destruction, ending their period as a great sea power, but then withdrew. Within a year, the now shattered islands were conquered by the Berber Almoravid dynasty, whose aggressive, militant approach to religion mirrored that of the crusaders and departed from the island's history as a tolerant haven under Cordoba and the taifa. The Almoravids were conquered and deposed in North Africa and on the Iberian Peninsula by the rival Almohad dynasty of Marrakesh in 1147. Muhammad ibn Ganiya, the Almoravid claimant, fled to Palma and established his capital there. His dynasty, the Banu Ghaniya, sought allies in their effort to recover their kingdom from the Almohads, leading them to grant Genoa and Pisa their first commercial concessions on the islands. In 1184, an expedition was sent to recapture Ifriqiya (the coastal areas of what is today Tunisia, eastern Algeria, and western Libya) but ended in defeat. Fearing reprisals, the inhabitants of the Balearics rebelled against the Almoravids and accepted Almohad suzerainty in 1187.

==== Reconquista ====
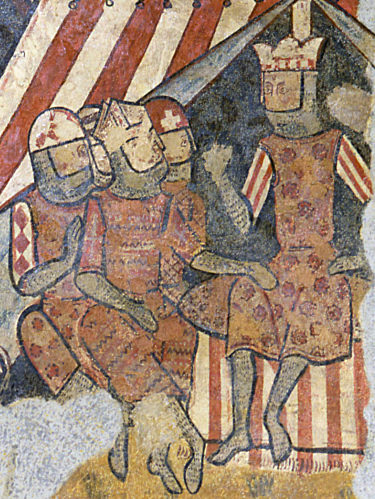
King James I of Aragon (furthest right) during his conquest of Mallorca in 1229.

On the last day of 1229, King James I of Aragon captured Palma after a three-month siege. The rest of Mallorca quickly followed. Menorca fell in 1232 and Ibiza in 1235. In 1236, James traded most of the islands to Peter I, Count of Urgell in exchange for Urgell, which he incorporated into his kingdom. Peter ruled from Palma, but after his death without issue in 1258, the islands reverted by the terms of the deal to the Crown of Aragon.

Flag of the medieval Kingdom of Majorca (1229–1715), which encompassed all Balearic Islands.

James died in 1276, having partitioned his domains between his sons in his will. The will created a new Kingdom of Mallorca from the Balearic islands and the mainland counties of Roussillon or Montpellier, which was left to his son James II. However, the terms of the will specified that the new kingdom be a vassal state to the Crown of Aragon, which was left to his older brother Peter. Chafing under the vassalage, James joined forces with Pope Martin IV and Philip III of France against his brother in the Aragonese Crusade, leading to a 10-year Aragonese occupation before the islands were restored in the 1295 Treaty of Anagni. The tension between the kingdoms continued through the generations until James's grandson James III was killed by the invading army of Peter's grandson Peter IV at the 1349 Battle of Llucmajor. The Balearic Islands were then incorporated directly into the Crown of Aragon.

=== Early modern period ===
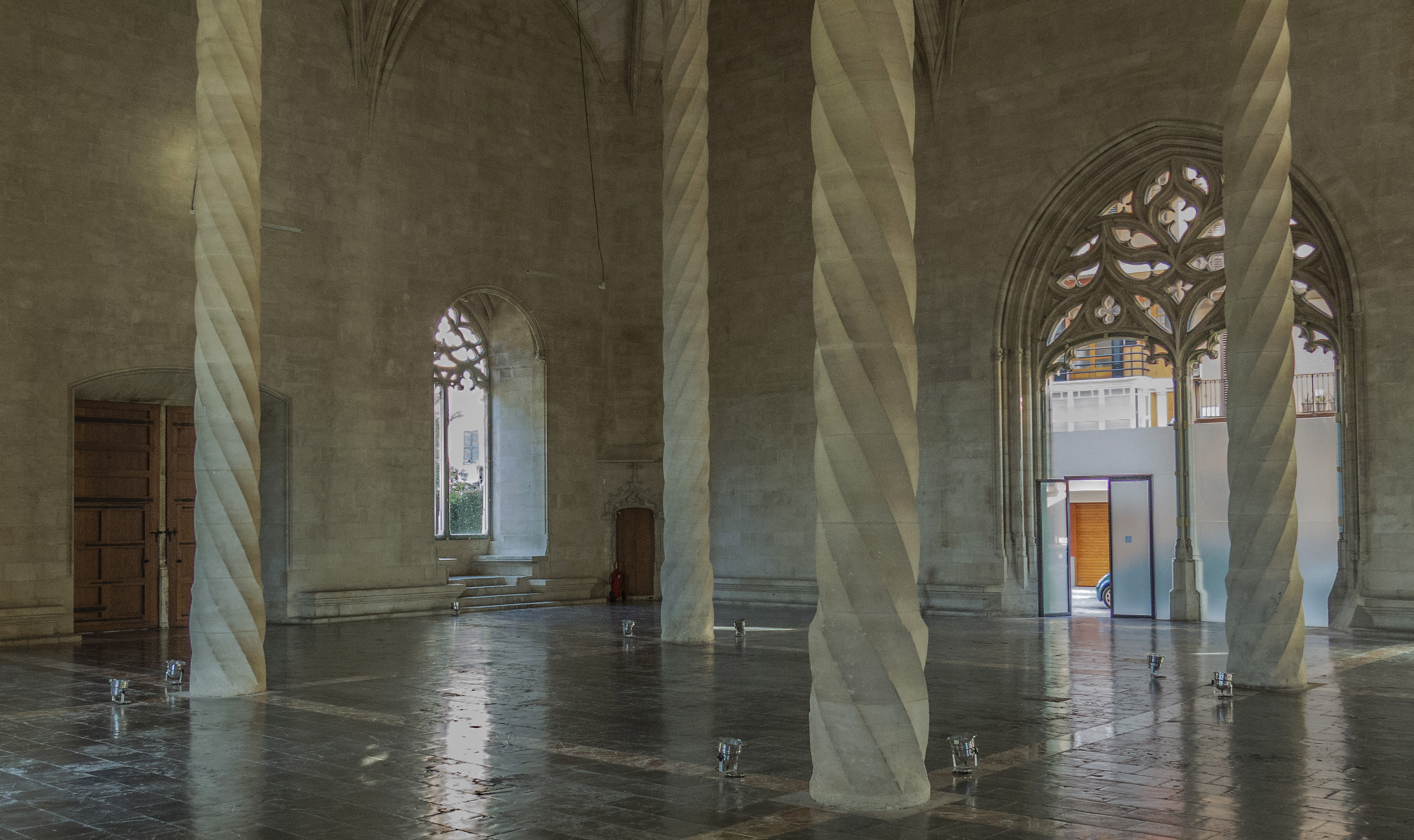
Llotja de Palma, 15th century

In 1469, Ferdinand II of Aragon (king of Aragon) and Isabella I of Castile (queen of Castile) were married. After their deaths, their respective territories (until then governed separately) were governed jointly, in the person of their grandson, Emperor Charles V.

The Balearic Islands were frequently attacked by the Ottomans and Barbary pirates from North Africa; Formentera was even temporarily abandoned by its population. In 1514, 1515 and 1521, the coasts of the Balearic Islands and the Spanish mainland were raided by Turkish privateers under the command of Ottoman admiral, Hayreddin Barbarossa. The Balearic Islands were ravaged in 1558 by Ottoman corsair Turgut Reis, and 4,000 people were enslaved.

==== Menorca ====
The island of Menorca was a British dependency for most of the 18th century as a result of the 1713 Treaty of Utrecht. This treaty—signed by the Kingdom of Great Britain and the Kingdom of Portugal as well as the Kingdom of Spain, to end the conflict caused by the War of the Spanish Succession—gave Gibraltar and Menorca to the Kingdom of Great Britain, Sardinia to Austria (both territories had been part of the Crown of Aragon for more than four centuries), and Sicily to the House of Savoy. In addition, Flanders and other European territories of the Spanish Crown were given to Austria. The island fell to French forces, under Armand de Vignerot du Plessis in June 1756 and was occupied by them for the duration of the Seven Years' War.

The British re-occupied the island after the war but, with their military forces diverted away by the American War of Independence, it fell to a Franco-Spanish force after a seven-month siege (1781–82). Spain retained it under the Treaty of Paris in 1783. However, during the French Revolutionary Wars, when Spain became an ally of France, it came under French rule.

Menorca was finally returned to Spain by the Treaty of Amiens during the French Revolutionary Wars, following the last British occupation, which lasted from 1798 to 1802. The continued presence of British naval forces, however, meant that the Balearic Islands were never occupied by the French during the Napoleonic Wars.

=== 20th century ===
The islands saw limited fighting in the 1936–1939 Spanish Civil War, with Menorca and Formentera staying loyal to the Republican Spanish Government, while the rest of the Balearic Islands supported the Spanish Nationalists. The Republican forces recaptured Ibiza early in the conflict, but were unable to take control of Mallorca in the Battle of Majorca in August 1936, an amphibious landing aimed at driving the Nationalists from the island and reclaiming it for the Republic. After the battle, Nationalist forces re-took Ibiza in September 1936. Menorca would be occupied by the Nationalists in February 1939 after the Battle of Menorca.

== Geography ==
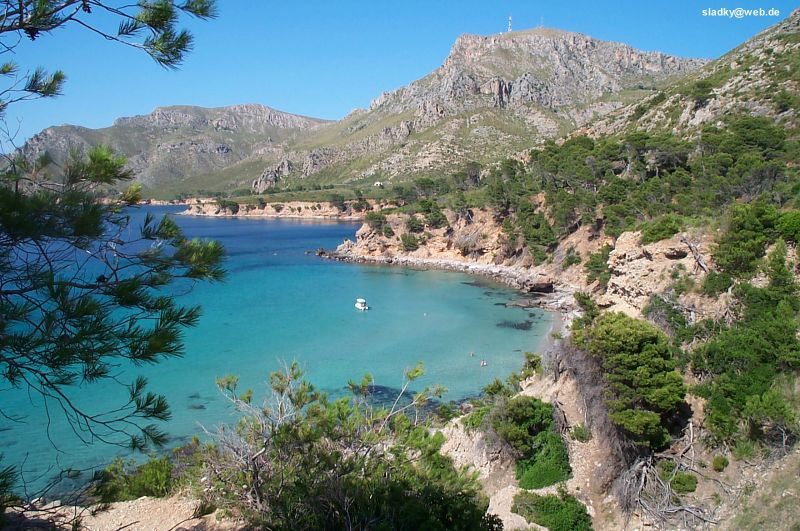
Mallorca in 2007

The autonomous community's main islands are Mallorca/Majorca (Mallorca), Menorca/Minorca (Menorca), Ibiza (Eivissa/Ibiza), and Formentera, all popular tourist destinations. Among the minor islands is Cabrera, the location of the Cabrera Archipelago Maritime-Terrestrial National Park. The Balearic Islands are bordered by Algeria to the south, Spain's Catalonia and Valencian Community to the west, France to the north, and Corsica and Sardinia to the east. The province has the longest coastline of any in Spain, at 1,428 kilometres.

The Balearic Islands are on a raised undersea platform called the Balearic Promontory, and were formed by uplift. They are cut by a network of northwest–southeast faults.

The islands can be further grouped into Mallorca, Menorca, and Cabrera as the Gymnesian Islands (Illes Gimnèsies), and Ibiza and Formentera as the Pityusic Islands (Illes Pitiüses in Catalan, sometimes called the Pine Islands in English). Many minor islands or islets are close, such as Es Conills, Es Vedrà, Sa Conillera, Dragonera, S'Espalmador, S'Espardell, Ses Bledes, Santa Eulària, Plana, Foradada, Tagomago, Na Redona, Colom, and L'Aire.

The Balearic Front is a sea density regime north of the Balearic Islands on their shelf slope that is responsible for some of the surface-flow characteristics of the Balearic Sea.

=== Wildlife ===
At the time of human arrival, the only terrestrial mammals native to the Balearic Islands were the dwarf goat-antelope Myotragus, the giant dormouse Hypnomys, and the shrew Nesiotites hidalgo which were found on Mallorca and Menorca, which became extinct shortly after human arrival. The only other terrestrial vertebrates native to the islands are Lilford's wall lizard, which today is confined to offshore islets surrounding Mallorca and Menorca, the Ibiza wall lizard native to the Pityusics, and the Majorcan midwife toad, today only found in the mountains of Mallorca. An extinct dwarf subspecies of Lataste's viper, Vipera latastei ebusitana, was also native to the Pityusics until it became extinct after human settlement. The hare Lepus granatensis solisi, a subspecies of the Granada hare, was also known to be native to Mallorca and is now considered extinct by the IUCN. The Balearic warbler is an endemic bird species found on the islands excluding Menorca. Seabirds nesting on the islands include the Balearic shearwater, European storm petrel, Scopoli's shearwater, European shag, Audouin's gull and the yellow-legged gull.

=== Climate ===
The islands mostly have typical hot-summer Mediterranean climates (Köppen: Csa) with some high-altitude areas having a Warm-summer Mediterranean climate (Köppen: Csb). The semi-arid climate (Köppen: BSh and BSk) is also found, mostly on Ibiza and Formentera but also in southern Mallorca.

Climate data for Palma, Port (1981–2010) 3 metres (9.8 feet) (Satellite view)
Month	Jan	Feb	Mar	Apr	May	Jun	Jul	Aug	Sep	Oct	Nov	Dec	Year
Mean daily maximum °C (°F)	15.4 (59.7)	15.5 (59.9)	17.2 (63.0)	19.2 (66.6)	22.5 (72.5)	26.5 (79.7)	29.4 (84.9)	29.8 (85.6)	27.1 (80.8)	23.7 (74.7)	19.3 (66.7)	16.5 (61.7)	21.8 (71.2)
Daily mean °C (°F)	11.9 (53.4)	11.9 (53.4)	13.4 (56.1)	15.5 (59.9)	18.8 (65.8)	22.7 (72.9)	25.7 (78.3)	26.2 (79.2)	23.5 (74.3)	20.2 (68.4)	15.8 (60.4)	13.1 (55.6)	18.2 (64.8)
Mean daily minimum °C (°F)	8.3 (46.9)	8.4 (47.1)	9.6 (49.3)	11.7 (53.1)	15.1 (59.2)	18.9 (66.0)	21.9 (71.4)	22.5 (72.5)	19.9 (67.8)	16.6 (61.9)	12.3 (54.1)	9.7 (49.5)	14.6 (58.3)
Average precipitation mm (inches)	43 (1.7)	37 (1.5)	28 (1.1)	39 (1.5)	36 (1.4)	11 (0.4)	6 (0.2)	22 (0.9)	52 (2.0)	69 (2.7)	59 (2.3)	48 (1.9)	449 (17.7)
Average precipitation days (≥ 1 mm)	6	6	5	5	4	2	1	2	5	7	6	7	53
Mean monthly sunshine hours	167	170	205	237	284	315	346	316	227	205	161	151	2,779
Source: Agencia Estatal de Meteorología

Climate data for Ibiza Airport (1981–2010) 6 metres (20 feet)
Month	Jan	Feb	Mar	Apr	May	Jun	Jul	Aug	Sep	Oct	Nov	Dec	Year
Mean daily maximum °C (°F)	15.7 (60.3)	15.9 (60.6)	17.7 (63.9)	19.7 (67.5)	22.7 (72.9)	26.8 (80.2)	29.7 (85.5)	30.3 (86.5)	27.7 (81.9)	24.0 (75.2)	19.6 (67.3)	16.7 (62.1)	22.2 (72.0)
Daily mean °C (°F)	11.9 (53.4)	12.1 (53.8)	13.7 (56.7)	15.6 (60.1)	18.6 (65.5)	22.6 (72.7)	25.6 (78.1)	26.3 (79.3)	23.8 (74.8)	20.2 (68.4)	15.9 (60.6)	13.1 (55.6)	18.3 (64.9)
Mean daily minimum °C (°F)	8.1 (46.6)	8.3 (46.9)	9.6 (49.3)	11.4 (52.5)	14.6 (58.3)	18.4 (65.1)	21.4 (70.5)	22.2 (72.0)	19.9 (67.8)	16.5 (61.7)	12.3 (54.1)	9.5 (49.1)	14.3 (57.7)
Average precipitation mm (inches)	37 (1.5)	36 (1.4)	27 (1.1)	31 (1.2)	27 (1.1)	11 (0.4)	5 (0.2)	18 (0.7)	57 (2.2)	58 (2.3)	53 (2.1)	52 (2.0)	413 (16.3)
Mean monthly sunshine hours	162	166	211	246	272	299	334	305	236	205	157	151	2,744
Source: Agencia Estatal de Meteorología

Climate data for Menorca Airport (1981–2010) 91 metres (299 feet)
Month	Jan	Feb	Mar	Apr	May	Jun	Jul	Aug	Sep	Oct	Nov	Dec	Year
Mean daily maximum °C (°F)	14.1 (57.4)	14.2 (57.6)	15.9 (60.6)	18.0 (64.4)	21.6 (70.9)	25.8 (78.4)	28.9 (84.0)	29.2 (84.6)	26.2 (79.2)	22.7 (72.9)	18.1 (64.6)	15.2 (59.4)	20.8 (69.4)
Daily mean °C (°F)	10.8 (51.4)	10.8 (51.4)	12.3 (54.1)	14.3 (57.7)	17.8 (64.0)	21.8 (71.2)	24.9 (76.8)	25.4 (77.7)	22.6 (72.7)	19.4 (66.9)	14.9 (58.8)	12.1 (53.8)	17.2 (63.0)
Mean daily minimum °C (°F)	7.5 (45.5)	7.4 (45.3)	8.6 (47.5)	10.6 (51.1)	13.9 (57.0)	17.8 (64.0)	20.8 (69.4)	21.5 (70.7)	18.9 (66.0)	16.1 (61.0)	11.6 (52.9)	9.0 (48.2)	13.6 (56.5)
Average precipitation mm (inches)	52 (2.0)	54 (2.1)	38 (1.5)	45 (1.8)	37 (1.5)	14 (0.6)	3 (0.1)	20 (0.8)	61 (2.4)	78 (3.1)	88 (3.5)	61 (2.4)	546 (21.5)
Mean monthly sunshine hours	144	146	202	222	270	311	347	312	225	183	142	130	2,632
Source: Agencia Estatal de Meteorología

== Demographics ==
Historical population
Year	Pop.	±%
1842	228,590	—
1857	262,893	+15.0%
1877	291,934	+11.0%
1887	313,480	+7.4%
1900	316,306	+0.9%
1910	335,850	+6.2%
1920	350,943	+4.5%
1930	375,199	+6.9%
1940	411,273	+9.6%
1950	419,628	+2.0%
1960	441,732	+5.3%
1970	532,946	+20.6%
1981	655,909	+23.1%
1991	709,138	+8.1%
2001	841,669	+18.7%
2011	1,100,503	+30.8%
2021	1,183,415	+7.5%
Source: INE

As of 2025, the population is 1,249,844, of which 49.8% are males, and 50.2% are females. Minors make up 16.5% of the population, and seniors make up 16.8%.

Due to the mass tourist appeal of the Balearic Islands and the establishment of connections already from the 1950s, the archipelago has become popular with German tourists. Many Germans own second homes or reside permanently on the islands.

The population distribution on the four island groups is as follows:

Island group (official name in Catalan, Spanish equivalent in brackets)	Population (2025)	% of total	Area (km^{2})	Density (inh./km^{2})
Mallorca (Mallorca)	971,068	77.7	3,640.21	266.8
Ibiza (Eivissa/Ibiza)	164,265	13.1	572.56	286.9
Menorca (Menorca)	102,821	8.2	695.70	147.8
Formentera (Formentera)	11,690	0.9	83.24	140.4

=== Religion ===
Roman Catholicism is by far the largest religion in the Balearic Islands. In 2012, the proportion of Balearic residents who identify as Roman Catholic was 68.7%. Xueta Christianity is a syncretic religion on the island of Mallorca, Spain, followed by the Xueta people, who are supposedly descendants of persecuted Jews who were converts to Christianity.

=== Immigration ===
Foreign population by country of birth (2025)
Country of birth	Population
Colombia	41,900
Argentina	38,485
Morocco	34,243
Germany	21,723
United Kingdom	18,374
Ecuador	18,012
Italy	13,271
Romania	10,537
Venezuela	9,812
Cuba	9,057
France	8,693
Uruguay	8,597
Paraguay	8,275
Bolivia	8,081
Peru	7,993

As of 2025, immigrants make up 28.7% of the population, the highest share among Spain's autonomous communities. The 5 largest foreign countries of birth are Colombia, Argentina, Morocco, Germany, and the United Kingdom.

== Administration ==
Each of the four islands is administered, along with its surrounding minor islands and islets, by an insular council (consell insular in Catalan) of the same name. These four insular councils are the first level of subdivision in the autonomous community (and province) of Illes Balears.

Before administrative reform in 1977, Ibiza and Formentera formed a single insular council, covering the whole of the Pitiusic islands.

The insular council of Mallorca is further subdivided into six comarques; three other comarques cover the same territory as the three remaining insular councils.

These nine comarques are then subdivided into municipalities (municipis), with the exception of Formentera, which simultaneously an insular council, a comarca, and a municipality.

The maritime and terrestrial natural reserves in the Balearic islands are not owned by the municipalities, even if they fall within their territory, but are owned and managed by the respective insular councils.

Those municipalities are further subdivided into civil parishes (parròquies) that are slightly larger than the traditional religious parishes.

On Ibiza and Formentera parishes are further divided into administrative villages (named véndes in Catalan); each vénda groups and number of houses and is considered an economic unit. In the past, these units were often formed around defensive structures, such as towers, which were used for protection against pirate attacks. They remain an important feature of Formentera's tradition settlement pattern.

=== Administrative divisions ===
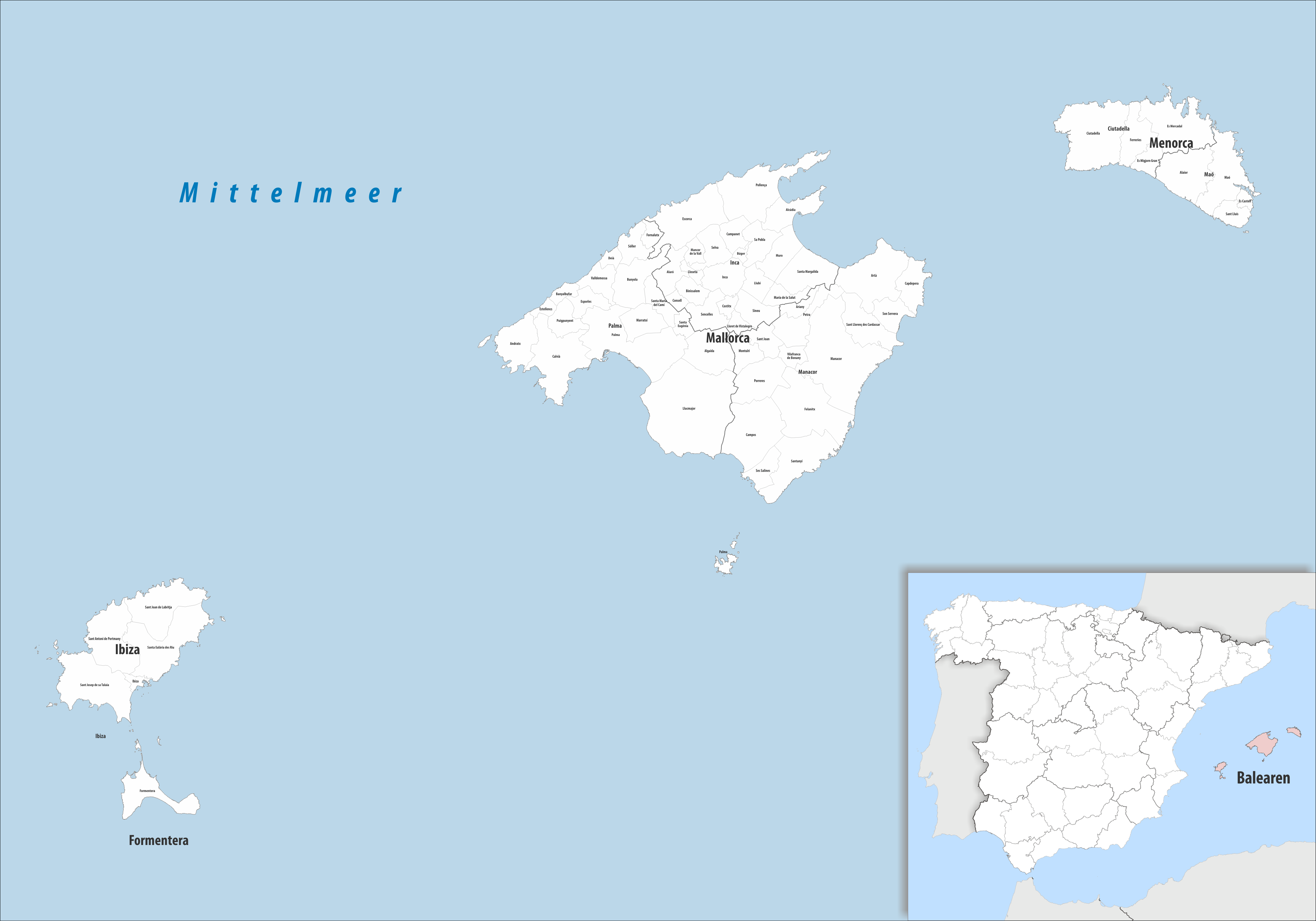
Map of the comarques and municipalities of the Balearic Islands

The Balearic Islands are divided into 9 comarques/comarcas:

Name	Capital	Population (2025)	Area (km^{2})	Density (inh./km^{2})	Municipalities
Formentera	Formentera	11,690	83.24	140.4	1
Ibiza	Ibiza	164,265	572.56	286.9	5
Llevant	Manacor	107,468	666.17	161.3	6
Pla de Mallorca	Petra	53,521	651.21	82.2	15
Menorca	Mahón	102,821	695.70	147.8	8
Migjorn	Llucmajor	90,304	810.79	111.4	5
Palma de Mallorca	Palma de Mallorca	443,196	208.63	2,124.3	1
Raiguer	Inca	158,493	471.66	336.0	13
Serra de Tramuntana	Sóller	118,086	831.75	142.0	13

==== Municipalities ====
The Balearic Islands are also further divided into 67 municipalities:

- Alaior
- Alaró
- Alcúdia
- Algaida
- Andratx
- Ariany
- Artà
- Banyalbufar
- Binissalem
- Búger
- Bunyola
- Calvià
- Campanet
- Campos
- Capdepera
- Ciutadella de Menorca
- Consell
- Costitx
- Deià
- Es Castell
- Es Mercadal
- Es Migjorn Gran
- Escorca
- Esporles
- Estellencs
- Felanitx
- Ferreries
- Formentera
- Fornalutx
- Ibiza
- Inca
- Lloret de Vistalegre
- Lloseta
- Llubí
- Llucmajor
- Mahón
- Manacor
- Mancor de la Vall
- Maria de la Salut
- Marratxí
- Montuïri
- Muro
- Palma
- Petra
- Pollença
- Porreres
- Puigpunyent
- Sa Pobla
- Sant Antoni de Portmany
- Sant Joan de Labritja
- Sant Joan
- Sant Josep de sa Talaia
- Sant Llorenç des Cardassar
- Sant Lluís
- Santa Eugènia
- Santa Eulària del Riu
- Santa Margalida
- Santa Maria del Camí
- Santanyí
- Selva
- Sencelles
- Ses Salines
- Sineu
- Sóller
- Son Servera
- Valldemossa
- Vilafranca de Bonany

== Culture ==
=== Cuisine ===
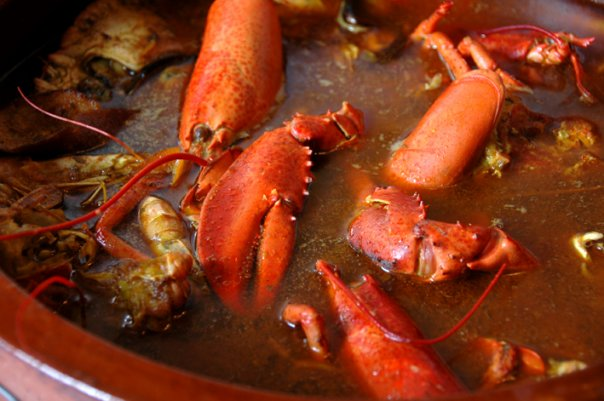
A lobster stew from Menorca, 2009

The cuisine of the islands can be grouped as part of wider Catalan, Spanish or Mediterranean cuisines. It features much pastry, cheese, wine, pork and seafood. Sobrassada is a local pork sausage. Lobster stew (so-called caldereta) from Menorca, is one of their most sought-after dishes. Mayonnaise is said to originate from the Menorcan city of Mahón, which also produces its own Mahón cheese. Local pastries include Ensaïmada, Flaó and Coca.

=== Languages ===
Both Catalan and Spanish are official languages in the islands. Virtually all residents of the Balearic islands speak Spanish fluently. Most of the native speakers of Spanish in the islands have family roots elsewhere in Spain.

Catalan is designated as a llengua pròpia, literally own language in its statute of autonomy. The Balearic dialect features several differences from standard Catalan. Typically, speakers of Balearic Catalan call their own language with a name specific to each island: Mallorquí, Menorquí, Eivissenc, Formenterenc. In 2003 74.6% of the islands' residents could speak Catalan (either Balearic or mainland) and 93.1% could understand it. The 2011 census, using slightly different phrasing, reported that 63.4% could speak fluently and 88.5% could understand Catalan.

Other languages, such as English, French, German and Italian, are also often spoken by residents, especially those who work in the tourism industry.

== Economy ==
The gross domestic product (GDP) of the autonomous community was 32.5 billion euros in 2018, accounting for 2.7% of Spanish economic output. GDP per capita adjusted for purchasing power was 29,700 euros or 98% of the EU27 average in the same year.

The real estate market in Mallorca, which accounts for the majority of property transactions in the Balearic Islands, has shown long-term resilience through major global economic shocks. This stability is driven largely by sustained international demand, cash-rich buyers, and limited housing supply.

== Transport ==
=== Water transport ===
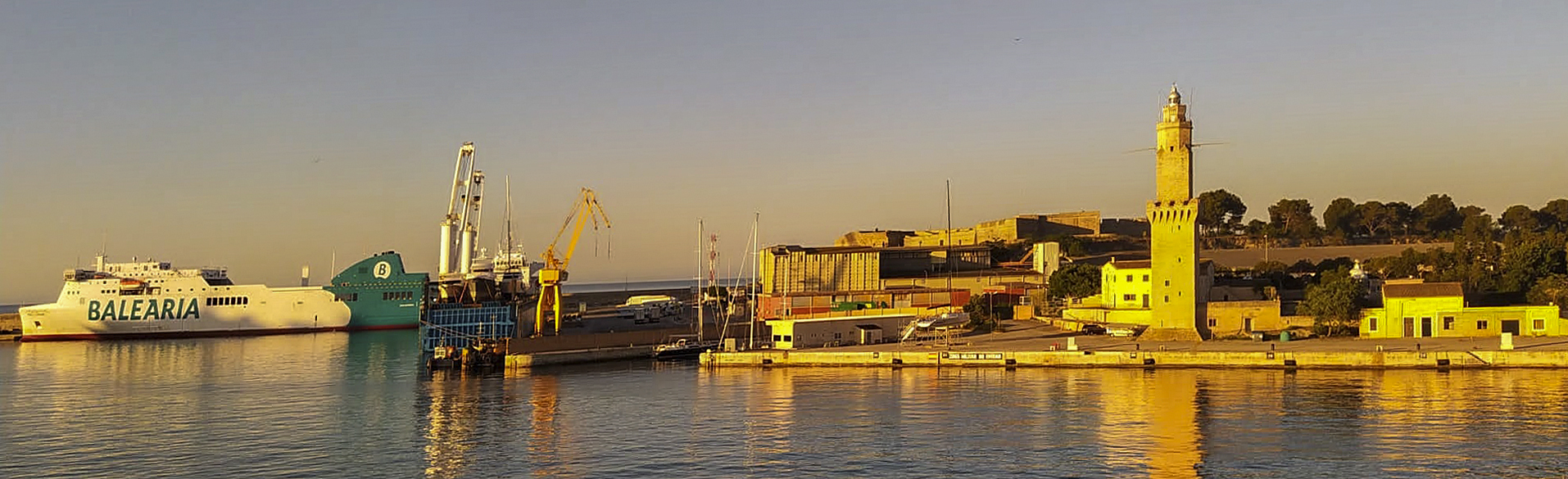
Baleària inside the port of Palma

There are approximately 150 ferries between Mallorca and other destinations every week, most of them to mainland Spain.

- Baleària
  - to the Balearic Islands from Dénia, Valencia and Barcelona
- Trasmediterránea
  - Mainland-Baleares: regular lines, in both directions, from:
    - Barcelona to Palma, Ibiza and Mahón.
    - Valencia to Palma, Ibiza and Mahón.
    - Gandia to Palma and Ibiza.
- Grandi Navi Veloci
  - to Palma from Valencia and Barcelona
- Corsica Ferries
  - Toulon (France) to Palma and Alcudia

=== Air ===
The islands have 3 main commercial airports:

- Palma de Mallorca Airport (serving Mallorca)
- Mahón Menorca Airport (serving Menorca)
- Ibiza Airport (serving Ibiza)

== Sport ==
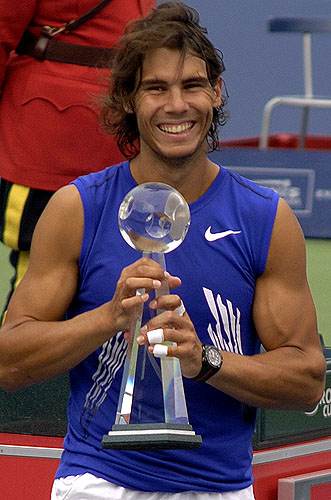
Tennis champion Rafael Nadal of Mallorca

=== Association football ===
The islands' most prominent football club is RCD Mallorca from Palma. Founded in 1916, it is the oldest club in the islands and its team currently (2025–26) plays in the top-tier La Liga. RCD Mallorca won the 2003 Copa del Rey, their sole major honour. They were runners-up in the 1999 European Cup Winners' Cup and the 2024 Copa del Rey. They contest the long-standing Palma derby with the other established team on the islands, CD Atlético Baleares.

The islands also have several professional football clubs, including UD Ibiza, a phoenix club of UD Ibiza-Eivissa, itself a phoenix of SD Ibiza, CE Constància from Inca, which despite playing in Tercera Federación, used to play in Segunda División in the early 1940s and the first half of the 1960s, with their best-ever placing being third in two consecutive seasons: 1942-43 Segunda División and 1943-44 Segunda División, and the now defunct CF Sporting Mahonés, the only club in Menorca to have reached Segunda División B.

There is also the Balearic Islands autonomous football team, and an unofficial Menorcan national team that plays in the International Island Games. Local clubs play in the regional divisions managed by the Balearic Islands Football Federation.

=== Basketball ===
In basketball, the islands haven't had much success. Menorca Bàsquet was the only basketball team to play in Liga ACB, spending 5 seasons in the league before disbanding in 2012.

Now there are 2 clubs from the Balearic Islands that have been in the second division LEB Oro in the last 5 years, CB Bahía San Agustín from Palma de Mallorca, relegated from LEB Oro at the 2021-22 LEB Oro season, and Menorca Bàsquet's phoenix club, CB Menorca, which made its debut in the 2023-24 LEB Oro season, finishing 12th in the league table and failing to get into promotion playoff spots.

Several basketball players have come from the Balearic Islands, including Rudy Fernández, Sergio Llull, Joan Sastre and Sergi García, with Llull and Fernández being the two most successful ones, having won the Eurobasket and the FIBA Basketball World Cup.

=== Individuals ===
Tennis player Rafael Nadal, winner of 22 Grand Slam single titles, and former world no. 1 tennis player Carlos Moyá are both from Mallorca. Rafael Nadal's uncle, Miguel Ángel Nadal, is a former Spanish international footballer. Other famous sportsmen include basketball player Rudy Fernández and motorcycle road racers Jorge Lorenzo, who won the 2010, 2012 and 2015 MotoGP World Championships, and Joan Mir, who won the 2020 MotoGP World Championship.

=== Watersports ===
Ibiza is one of the world's top yachting hubs attracting a wide assortment of charter yachts.

== See also ==
- Formentera
- Ibiza
- Instagram tourism
- Mallorca
- Menorca

== Further references ==
- Guide to yacht clubs and marinas in Spain: Costa Blanca, Costa del Azahar, Islas Baleares (Madrid: Ministry of Transportation, Tourism and Communications, General Office of the Secretary of Tourism, General Office of Tourism Companies and Activities, 1987)
