= Consell =

- Municipality
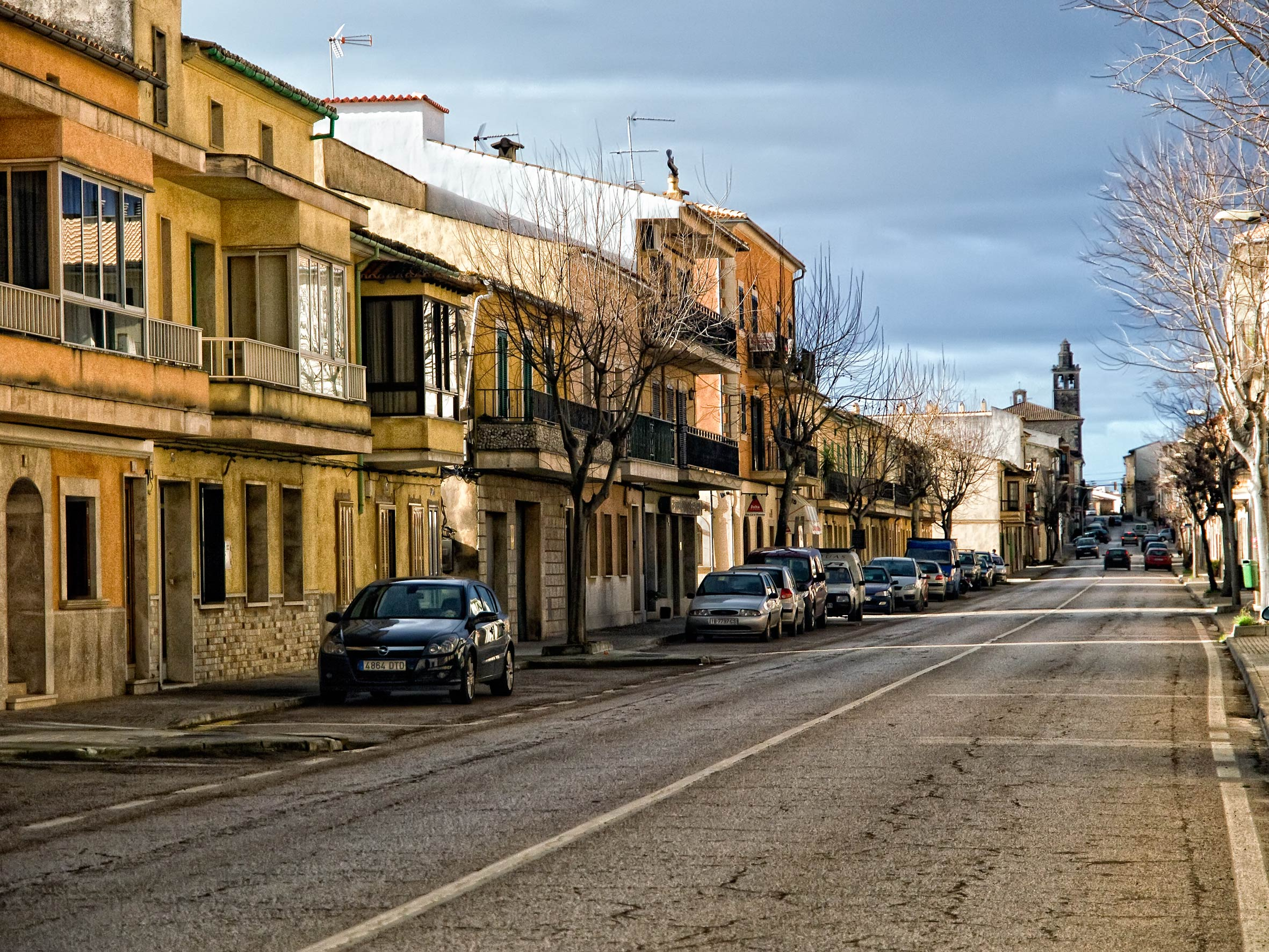
- Consell streets

- Coat of arms

- Location within Mallorca

- Location in Mallorca Consell (Balearic Islands) Consell (Spain)
- Coordinates: 39°40′09″N 2°48′44″E
- Country: Spain
- Autonomous community: Balearic Islands
- Province: Balearic Islands
- Comarca: Raiguer

Government
  - Mayor: Andreu Isern (PSOE)

Area
  - Total: 13.70 km^{2} (5.29 sq mi)

Population (2024)
  - Total: 4,304
  - Density: 314.2/km^{2} (813.7/sq mi)
- Time zone: UTC+1 (CET)
  - Summer (DST): UTC+2 (CEST)
- Website: ajconsell.net

Consell (Balearic Catalan: [konˈsəʎ], also [konˈsəj]) is a municipality in the district of Raiguer on Mallorca, one of the Balearic Islands, Spain.

== See also ==
- List of municipalities in Balearic Islands
