= Sa Pobla =

Sa Pobla La Puebla
- Municipality
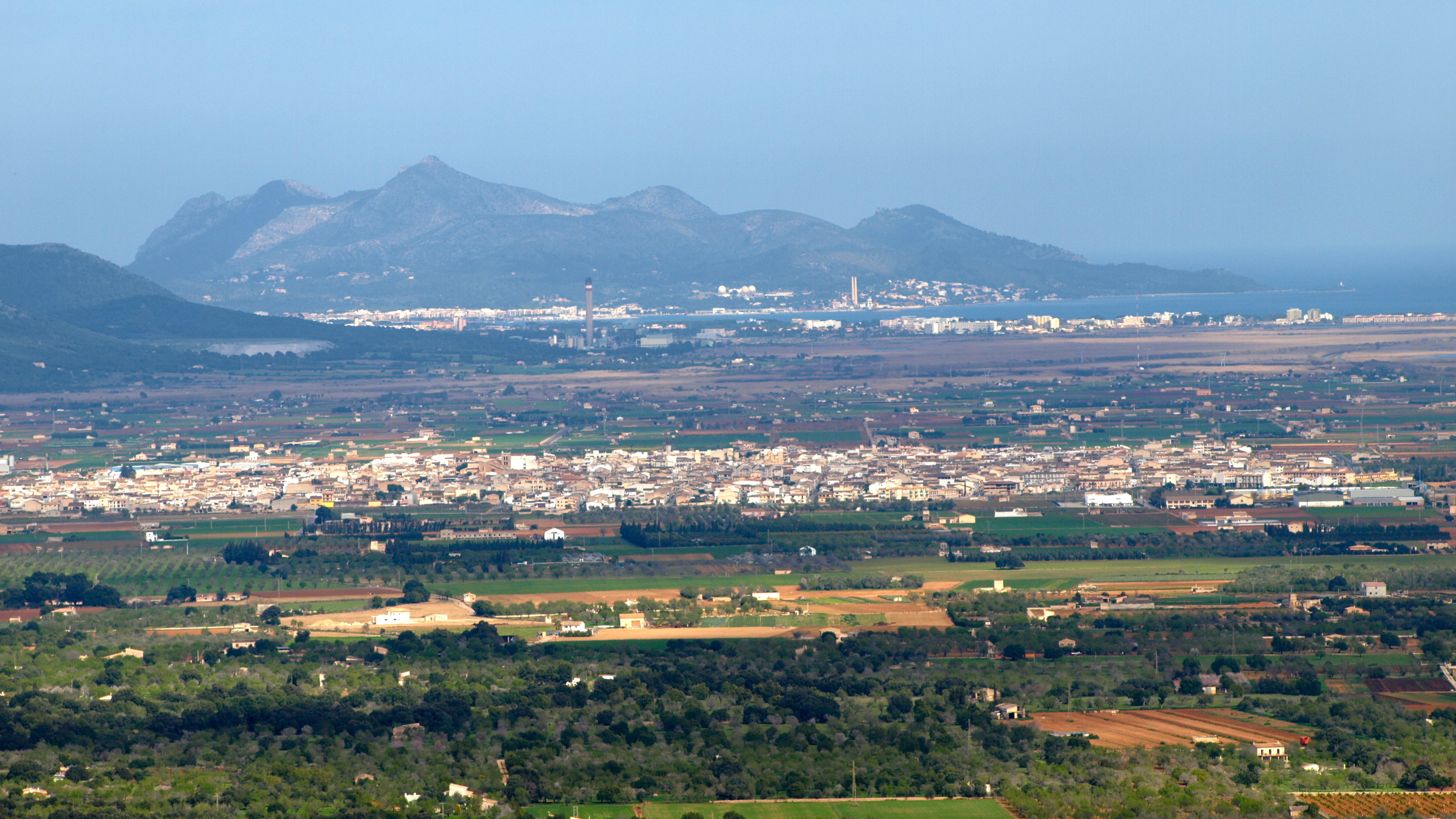

- Flag Coat of arms

- Location of Sa Pobla in Mallorca

- Location in Mallorca Sa Pobla (Balearic Islands) Sa Pobla (Spain)
- Coordinates: 39°46′9″N 3°1′21″E
- Country: Spain
- Autonomous community: Balearic Islands
- Province: Balearic Islands
- Comarca: Raiguer
- Judicial district: Inca

Government
  - Mayor: Joan Comas Reus

Area
  - Total: 48.59 km^{2} (18.76 sq mi)
- Elevation: 28 m (92 ft)

Population (2025-01-01)
  - Total: 14,990
  - Density: 308.5/km^{2} (799.0/sq mi)
- Demonym: Poblers
- Time zone: UTC+1 (CET)
  - Summer (DST): UTC+2 (CEST)
- Postal code: 07420

Sa Pobla (Balearic Catalan: [sə ˈpobːlə]) is a municipality in the district of Raiguer on Mallorca, one of the Balearic Islands. It is a terminus on the Mallorca rail network.

The town is in the north of the island. It has an area of 48.53 square kilometres (18.74 sq mi), stretching from the Serra de Tramuntana, the Plan and the Bay of Alcúdia. It comprises three very different areas: the Marjal, fertile plains in large part devoted to irrigated agriculture; l 'lagoon, a large area of scenic and ecological value where the streams and San Miguel de Muro (of Almadrà).
