= Felanitx dialect =

Mallorcan dialect

Felanitx
- felanitxer
- Native to: Spain
- Region: Felanitx
- Language family: Indo-European: Italic; Romance; Western Romance; Gallo-Romance; Occitano-Romance; Catalan; Eastern; Insular; Balearic; Mallorcan; Felanitx
- Early forms: Proto-Indo-European: Proto-Italic; Old Latin; Vulgar Latin; Proto-Romance; Old Occitan; Old Catalan

Language codes
- ISO 639-3: –
- Glottolog: None
- Map of Felanitx in Mallorca.

Felanitx is a dialect of Catalan that is part of the Mallorcan subdialect, the Balearic dialect and the eastern block of Catalan. It is spoken in the town of Felanitx as well as in the various towns that make up the municipality: Cas Concos des Cavaller, es Carritxó, s'Horta and Portocolom. Like all dialect variants, there are a series of lexical, morphological and phonetic-phonological features that characterize it, but, mainly, Felanitx is characterized from the rest of the Mallorcan dialects by the vowel system, which is shared by other towns in Mallorca such as Maria de la Salut or Sant Joan, where it was probably exported from Felanitx at the time these towns were established.

== Vocalism ==
=== Tonic Vocalism ===
Felanitxer vowel system.

The vocalism of Felanitx is based on the general Mallorcan vowel system, which in historical times was shared by the four islands and by all of continental Eastern Catalan: three back vowels (/u/, /o/ and /ɔ/), three front vowels (/i/, /e/ and /ɛ/) and two central vowels (/a/ and the neutral /ə/). In Felanitx, this system has been modified and one element has been deleted, so that /ɔ/ has become more open and a little more centered, /a/ has become more closed and a little more anterior and /ɛ/ has become more closed to the point of converging with /e/. This is why, in Felanitx, no difference is made between the open e and the closed e, God and the number ten are pronounced the same: ['dew].

On the other hand, when followed by implosive /l/, /a/ has a much later realization that is closer to /ɔ/: ['ɔltɾə] altre (other), ['dɔlt] dalt (up).

In diachronic terms, it is difficult to say which of the three movements came first: whether it was the extreme opening of /ɔ/ that caused a chain reaction of /a/ and /ɛ/ or whether it was /a/ that closed, causing /ɛ/ to also close and converge with /e/, and then /ɔ/ to open to fill the gap caused by the closing of /a/. In general, in the rest of Mallorca it is observed that /ɔ/ is rather open and /a/ rather anterior, but, on the other hand, /ɛ/ is shown to be quite open, unlike in Felanitx.

Thus, in Felanitx people pronounce ['pɒɾtə] porta (door), [sɒl] sol (sun), so that someone who is not familiar with this speech could perceive parta and sal. In the same way, people pronounce ['pæstə] (pasta), [po'zæ] posar (to put), also ['terə] terra (earth) and [cə'fe] cafè (coffee).

=== Atonal Vocalism ===
The vocalism of Felanitx is the same as that of general Mallorcan: /a/ and /e/ (remember that, in Felanitx, there is no /ɛ/) become [ə] in unstressed position, but /ɔ/ and /o/ do not become [u], as a general rule.

On the contrary, the closure of /o/ and /ɔ/ into [u] does occur when the following syllable contains /i/ or /u/: [kumfi'tuɾə] confitura (jam), [kus'tum] costum (custom). This phenomenon also occurs throughout Eastern Catalan, but not in Palma de Mallorca or in neighboring Manacor or in the towns of northern Mallorca.

In Felanitx, the elision of /ə/ is not performed in unstressed finals in /iə/: memòria, gàbia, gràcies, and not memori, gabi, gracis, as is common in the rest of Mallorca.

== Other linguistic features ==
In Felanitx, as in other towns on Mallorca such as Palma, Pollença or the neighbouring towns of Santanyí and Manacor, the consonants /k/ and /g/ have a much more advanced articulation when they are followed by a non-back vowel, that is, [i], [e], [ə] and [a] (it should be remembered that in Felanitx the /ɛ/ has converged with /e/), also when they take their approximant equivalent. Thus, casa is pronounced ['cazə] and gat ['ɟat].

It also highlights some local pronunciation, such as fermatge formatge (cheese), and some local words, the best known of which is estiregassó pèsol (pea).

== Relationship with other languages ==
In addition to the town of Felanitx, the towns of Maria de la Salut and Sant Joan are also characterized by the confusion of /e/ and /ɛ/, so that God and the number ten are pronounced the same: ['dew]. Despite the fact that the three towns are not adjacent, it could be that this is a single phenomenon, in the event that the establishment and colonization of Maria de la Salut and Sant Joan was carried out, in part, by a population of Felanitx origin. This hypothesis would place the appearance of the phenomenon at a point as far back in time as the 16th century.

== Bibliography ==
- Bibiloni, Gabriel (2016). El català de Mallorca. La fonètica. Palma de Mallorca: Lleonard Muntaner editor. ISBN 978-84-16554-04-1.
- Grimalt, Josep (1972). El vocalisme de Felanitx (PDF). Mayurqa.
- Moll, Francesc de Borja (2006). El parlar de Mallorca. València: Universitat de València. ISBN 978-84-370-6412-3.
- Puigròs Caldentey, Maria Antònia (2001). Anàlisi del sistema vocàlic balear. Llengua & literatura. ISSN 0213-6554.
- Veny, Joan (1978). Els parlars catalans. Barcelona: Dopesa. ISBN 84-7235-388-5.
