= Palma dialect =

Mallorcan dialect

Palma
- Palma de Mallorca
- Native to: Spain
- Region: Palma de Mallorca
- Ethnicity: Mallorcans
- Language family: Indo-European: Italic; Romance; Western Romance; Gallo-Romance; Occitano-Romance; Catalan; Eastern; Insular; Balearic; Mallorcan; Palma
- Early forms: Proto-Indo-European: Proto-Italic; Old Latin; Vulgar Latin; Proto-Romance; Old Occitan; Old Catalan

Language codes
- ISO 639-3: –
- Glottolog: None
- Map of Palma de Mallorca in Mallorca.

Palma is a dialect of Catalan that is part of the Mallorcan subdialect, the Balearic dialect and the eastern block of Catalan. It is spoken in the city of Palma de Mallorca. It is a speech with heterogeneous characteristics and in a process of change so accelerated that the features that characterized it are on the verge of disappearing.

== Social, historical and geographical factors ==
The city of Palma, historically, was formed by a walled urban core (the center), some suburbs (such as Jonquet or Hostalets d'en Canyelles) and a large agricultural area (the entire area irrigated by the Font de la Vila and all of Prat de Sant Jordi). Therefore, not the entire area of the capital was urban, a fact that conditions the sociology of the population and, consequently, their speech.

Palma was established, over the centuries, as one of the identity traits of the people of Palma that distinguished them from people from outside the city. The perception that there was a social difference between urban Mallorcans and rural Mallorcans was the reason that led both to make their speech a symbol that identified them as a social group. Several phenomena of hypercorrection seem to indicate that the people of Palma tried to avoid those traits that they associated with inhabitants from outside the city. However, since the municipality of Palma also included rural areas, Palma was not a homogeneous reality, but rather varied depending on the neighborhood; and even more so when, throughout the 19th and 20th centuries, a whole series of new towns began to appear, such as Sant Jordi, Son Ferriol, Gènova, el Viver and all the neighborhoods resulting from the demolition of the walls and the expansion of the Palma under the Calvet Plan. All these new towns were born with people mainly from Palma, but also from other localities: for example, the population of Sant Jordi comes from the towns of Llucmajor and Algaida. Thus, Palma varied greatly depending on the neighborhood: whether it was urban or rural, whether its inhabitants came from Palma or other towns and, ultimately, on the speaker himself. One of the neighborhoods where all the traits of the people of Palma took on greater strength was that of Santa Catalina, possibly due to its firmly working-class and humble character.

Apart from the more general speech of the city, other sociolects also existed in Palma, such as the speech of the Xueta or that of the Botifarra.

Just as in Palma Catalan began to coexist with Spanish (starting with Francoist Spain through some middle and upper class families who abandoned Catalan and, later, through Spanish immigration), Palma entered a process of Hispanicization which, together with the fact that internal mobility on Mallorca has been very strong at the end of the 20th century, has almost led to the death of all the features that characterized it. The people of Palma began to abandon their distinctive features towards the middle of the century, and some of them are difficult to find among speakers born after the 1950s. Most of the people of Palma have adopted a more neutral and, in many cases, more hispanicized Mallorcan.

== Features ==
In Palma, as in other towns such as Manacor, Pollença, Felanitx or Santanyí, the consonants /k/ and /g/ have a much more advanced articulation when followed by a non-back vowel, that is, [i], [e], [ə], [ɛ] and [a]. Thus, casa is pronounced ['cazə] and gat, ['ɟat]. This feature has been lost among most speakers born after the 1980s.

Like the speech of other towns such as Manacor, Pollença or Inca, the Palma dialect does not reduce the /o/ to [u] even when /i/ or /u/ appears in an adjacent syllable, in words such as coixí or comú. Furthermore, there is a great tendency to open the /u/ to [o] in these same contexts by hypercorrection, and thus estudiar, fugir, humit and curiós become estodiar, fogir, homit and coriós. This phenomenon still shows considerable vitality, even among the youngest.

The /a/ that is in contact with one or two palatal sounds becomes [ɛ] in many words, such as butxaca [bu'tʃɛcə], canya ['cɛɲə], diari [di'ɛɾi], llarg ['ʎɛɾk], quasi ['cɛzi], and viatge [vi'ɛdʒə]. This feature can still be heard in some words among young people. On the other hand, the phenomenon becomes the same in the town of Lloret de Vistalegre, and, to a greater extent, in that of Sineu.

The neutral vowel [ə], in contact with a palatal consonant, tends to close into [i] in certain words, such as esqueixar [əsci'ʃa], ganxet [ɟiɲ'tʃət], galleta [ɟi'ʎətə] or cagar [ci'ʝa]. This phenomenon occurs throughout Mallorca, but in the capital, traditionally, it takes on more strength, although it is gradually being lost among the younger generations.

In the past, in Palma there was an assimilation caste that affected sibilants followed by a consonant, and thus people said vaig fer ['va'f:e] and es cap [ə'c:ap]. This phenomenon, which was not general, has disappeared today, although it has reappeared among speakers who are more hispanicized due to the influence of the southern varieties of Spanish.

The intervocalic /w/ does not become [v], as it does in much of Mallorca. This phenomenon, in Palma, traditionally went further, and (possibly by hypercorrection) the /w/ was recovered in words like blaua blava (blue), noua nova (new), the possessives meua, teua and seua and, even, in the imperfects: anaua, cantaua. This phenomenon is difficult to detect in speakers born after the 1950s.

Particular pronunciation of some words: tothom [tu'tɔm] (and not [to'tɔm], as in the rest of Mallorca) and the particular doblers and vostè, which in Palma are still pronounced with an unstressed open o: [dɔ'b:es], [vɔs'tə].

Some particular lexical element, such as sofrito ceba tendra (tender onion), called grell in the rest of Mallorca.

== Hispanicization ==
In Francoist Spain, some wealthy families and middle-class families with aspirations of social ascension started speaking Spanish to their children appeared as a result of the prestige that Spanish enjoyed with the new regime. Years later, the arrival of large waves of Spanish-speaking immigration stopped this fashion. Since then the fact of speaking Spanish began to be associated with the lower classes of Spanish-speaking immigration, which all left a trace in those who had adopted a more hispanicized speech, which were the generations of the 1960s and 1970s. This speech was known as parlar bleda, and was characterized, among several features, by the fact that the l was not velarized, as the Catalan l is , but imitated the Spanish one.

Today, that first bleda speech has not been transmitted, but this has not stopped the Hispanicization. Among young people, the Yesism is very widespread, as is the pronunciation of the l without velarization, among other features originating from Spanish.

== Bibliography ==
- Bibiloni, Gabriel (2016). El català de Mallorca. La fonètica. Palma de Mallorca: Lleonard Muntaner editor. ISBN 978-84-16554-04-1.
- Joan Veny i Clar (1978). Els parlars catalans (in Catalan). Barcelona: Dopesa. ISBN 84-7235-388-5.
- Francesc de Borja Moll i Casasnovas (1980). El parlar de Mallorca (in Catalan). Palma: Moll. ISBN 8427306334.
