= Pollencí dialect =

Mallorcan dialect

Pollencí
- Pollença
- pollencí
- Native to: Spain
- Region: Pollença
- Language family: Indo-European: Italic; Romance; Western Romance; Gallo-Romance; Occitano-Romance; Catalan; Eastern; Insular; Balearic; Mallorcan; Pollencí
- Early forms: Proto-Indo-European: Proto-Italic; Old Latin; Vulgar Latin; Proto-Romance; Old Occitan; Old Catalan

Language codes
- ISO 639-3: –
- Glottolog: None
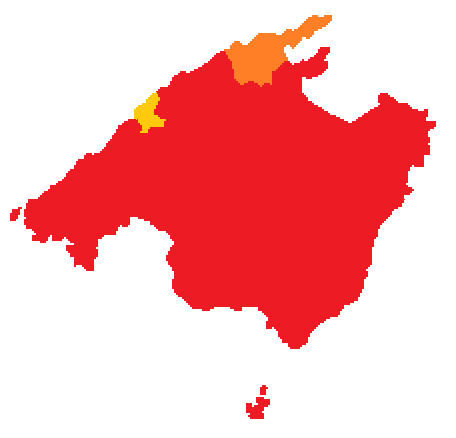
- Map of the Mallorcan dialects, including Pollencí in orange.

Pollencí or Pollença is a dialect of Catalan that is part of the Mallorcan subdialect, the Balearic dialect and the eastern block of Catalan. It is spoken in the town of Pollença, in the north of Mallorca, and its main characteristic is that it is the only Balearic dialect that does not use the article salat (a system of articles derived from Latin ipse); instead it uses the article derived from the Latin ille, like the rest of Catalan.

The linguistic uniqueness of Pollencí may have been favored by the fact that it is a peripheral locality, partially surrounded the Serra de Tramuntana and that until the 20th century was poorly connected to the rest of the island.

== Morphology ==
The definite article of Pollencí is the article derived from the Latin ille, unlike the rest of Mallorca. However, in oral use, and unlike the rest of Catalan, Pollencí has vocalized the implosive l of the masculine, so that some particular forms have resulted. Thus, the singular [əl] el has evolved to [əw] eu and later to [u] u, while the plural [əls] els has evolved to [əws] eus and later to [us] us. Furthermore, when the masculine plural article is followed by a consonant, the s of the plural is elided. On the other hand, followed by the preposition with amb takes the form lo, as does the rest of Mallorcan with so.

	Masculine + consonant	Masculine + vowel	Feminine + consonant	Feminine + vowel
Singular	u Standard Catalan: el carro ("the cart"); Pollencí: [u 'caro]	l l'home ("the man") [l 'ɔmo] (article as standard Catalan)	lə la cama ("the bed") [lə 'camə] (article as standard Catalan)	l l'espatla ("the shoulder") [l əs'pallə] (article as standard Catalan)
amb…	lo Standard Catalan: amb el carro ("with the cart"); Pollencí: [ən lo 'caro]	l l'home ("the man") [l 'ɔmo] (article as standard Catalan)	lə la cama ("the bed") [lə 'camə] (article as standard Catalan)	l l'espatla ("the shoulder") [l əs'pallə] (article as standard Catalan)
Plural	u Standard Catalan:els carros ("the carts"); Pollencí: [u 'caros]	uz Standard Catalan:els homes ("the men") Pollencí:[uz 'ɔmos]	ləs les cames ("the beds") [ləs 'caməs] (article as standard Catalan)	ləz les espatles ("the shoulders") [ləz əs'palləs] (article as standard Catalan)
amb…	los Standard Catalan: amb els carros ("with the carts"); Pollencí: [ən los 'caros]	uz Standard Catalan:els homes ("the men") Pollencí:[uz 'ɔmos]	ləs les cames ("the beds") [ləs 'caməs] (article as standard Catalan)	ləz les espatles ("the shoulders") [ləz əs'palləs] (article as standard Catalan)

The fact that the article salat is not used in Pollença has often been interpreted as a fact due to the historical vicissitudes of repopulation; thus, the contingent of repopulators from the eastern part of the Principality of Catalonia (where, at that time, the article salat was still alive) could have been smaller than in the rest of the island, while, on the other hand, there would have been more settlers from the western part of the Principality than in the rest of the island. This fact has not been proven.

== Other linguistic features ==
In Pollencí, as in the speech of other Mallorcan localities such as Palma de Mallorca, Manacor or Felanitx. The consonants /k/ and /g/ have a much more advanced articulation when they are followed by a non-back vowel, that is, [i], [e], [ɛ], [ə] and [a], so that they are pronounced [c] and [ɟ]. Thus, casa is pronounced ['cazə] and gat, ['ɟat].

Pollencí is also the only Mallorcan variety that knows the noun xic/a (boy/girl). It shares this feature with Western Catalan.

== Bibliography ==
- Bibiloni, Gabriel (2016). El català de Mallorca. La fonètic. Palma de Mallorca: Lleonard Muntaner editor. ISBN 978-84-16554-04-1.
- Moll, Francesc de Borja (1980). El parlar de Mallorca. Palma de Mallorca: Moll. ISBN 8427306334.
- Salom Mir, Andreu (2006). El parlar de Pollença. Llengua Nacional. p. 12.
- Veny, Joan (1982). Els parlars catalans. Palma de Mallorca: Moll. ISBN 9788447542017.
- Veny, Joan (1978). Estudis de geolingüística catalana. Barcelona: Edicions 62.
