= Sóller dialect =

Mallorcan dialect

Sóller
- solleric
- Native to: Spain
- Region: Sóller and Fornalutx
- Ethnicity: Sollerians
- Language family: Indo-European: Italic; Romance; Western Romance; Gallo-Romance; Occitano-Romance; Catalan; Eastern; Insular; Balearic; Mallorcan; Sóller
- Early forms: Proto-Indo-European: Proto-Italic; Old Latin; Vulgar Latin; Proto-Romance; Old Occitan; Old Catalan

Language codes
- ISO 639-3: –
- Glottolog: None
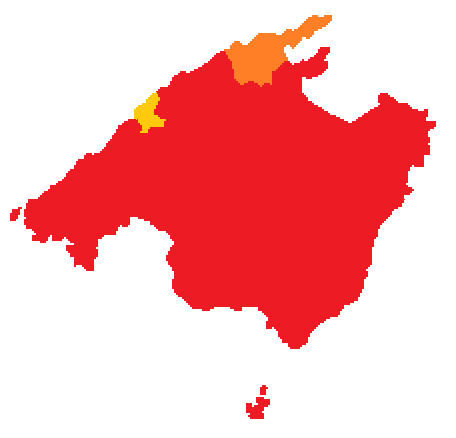
- Map of the Mallorcan dialects, including Sóller in yellow.

Sóller is a dialect of Catalan that is part of the Mallorcan subdialect, the Balearic dialect and the eastern block of Catalan. It is spoken in the Vall de Sóller, which includes the towns of Sóller, Fornalutx and Biniaraix. It is fundamentally characterized by its unstressed vowels, which, unlike the rest of Mallorca and like the other Balearic Islands and all of Central Catalan, contains only three elements, that is, it neutralizes unstressed /ɔ/, /o/ and /u/ into [u]; and by a whole series of lexical and, to a lesser extent, phonetic elements, which are the result of commercial contact with France at the beginning of the 20th century and the isolation of the valley from the rest of the island.

It has been observed that the language of Sóller is quite close to the language of Ciutadella de Menorca, as they share many of the features that differentiate them from the rest of the towns on their respective islands. However, it does not seem that the causes of this fact go beyond chance.

== History ==
It is a dialect that is quite different from the rest of Mallorcan and there is a very strong awareness of this fact, both among the Sollerians, who see in their own dialect one of the main signs of Sollerian identity and among the rest of Mallorcans, who can quickly identify the conversation of a Sollerian. Among the causes of this fact, it must be taken into account that Sóller is a fairly isolated town within the island itself, since the valley is surrounded by the Serra de Tramuntana and has a single access point, the Coll de Sóller, which did not have a road for carts until the time of Isabella II. At that time, it is said that it was easier to go from Palma de Mallorca to Sóller by sea than by land. This situation began to change in 1912 with the construction of the Ferrocarril de Sóller and was definitively modified in 1997, when the Sóller tunnel, the longest tunnel in Mallorca, was built.

On the other hand, as a result of an agricultural crisis that affected the town's orange groves (at that time the main engine of the local economy), many Sollerians emigrated to France and settled in various areas of Languedoc and France. There were many who went there as adults, but also as young people and many were born in the France. This conditioned the dialect of these Sollerians: some borrowed many words from French, while those who were born there adopted certain aspects of French phonetics. All of this profoundly affected Sóller when throughout the 20th century the Sollerians who emigrated began to return home. Many of these linguistic features have been lost but many others are preserved as dialectal features that are very much alive among the entire population: above all they are of a phonetic and lexical type.

== Vocalism ==
=== Unstressed vocalism ===
Sóller's vocalism is mainly characterized because it is the only dialect spoken throughout Mallorca that contains only three elements in the unstressed vowel system. In the same way as Central Catalan, Northern Catalan, Ibizan and Menorcan, when they are in unstressed position, the vowels /ɔ/ and /o/ close to [u], so that they are indistinguishable from /u/. Thus, comprar is pronounced [kumprá] (buy) i botó, [butó] (button).

This is a phonetic change that brings it closer to the rest of the dialects of Eastern Catalan and separates it from the rest of Mallorcan, the only eastern dialect that does not suffer this reduction. It is worth noting, however, that the phenomenon is not inherited from the speech of the peninsular settlers, but occurs later and in four different foci: Ibizan, Menorcan, Sóller and the mainland dialects. In the case of Sóller, the moment of the change can be placed around the 17th century, so that the dialectal feature would be about 400 years old.

Among the internal causes of the phenomenon, we must consider the leveling of the unstressed vowel system: once the vowels /a/, /ɛ/, /e/ and /ə/ in unstressed position were neutralized in [ə], that is, the entire previous series, the language could try to do the same in the subsequent series. As for the external causes, we must take into account that this is a fairly isolated speech within the island itself, since the valley is surrounded by mountains and has a single access point, the Coll de Sóller, which did not have a carriage road until the time of Isabel II. This fact could have reinforced internal innovations and neutralized foreign influences so as not to innovate.

The trait remains alive in the population of all ages, but it seems to have stagnated: it has ceased to be productive and neologisms do not suffer this vowel reduction.

=== Tonic vocalism ===
The tonic vowel system of Sóller is the same as that of the other dialects: it is formed by eight vowels, among which is the neutral /ə/. This vocalism is the stage before the evolved vocalism of Central Catalan, Ibizan and Menorcan and the stage after the vocalism of all Western Catalan.

== Consonants ==
Sóller, like Menorcan and certain towns in Mallorca such as Llucmajor, Campos, Santa Margalida and Sa Pobla, mutes the intervocalic /j/, so that fulla (leaf) and palla (straw) has the sound fua and paa [páə]. The result is a vowel contact that is resolved with a hiatus if the two vowels are different, but is resolved with elision of one of the two elements if the vowel is the same: deia [də], ovella [u'və].

Due to the influence of French, many speakers, young and old, articulate the double r, [r], as a uvular, [ʀ]. This does not affect the simple r, which remains [ɾ] and is quite different from the vibrant one. Also due to the influence of French, many speakers articulate the double l, /ʎ/, as an approximant, /j/; thus, callar and estrella are pronounced caiar and estreia. However, these features are not generalized and not all Sollerians speak this way, but a very significant number do. The second phenomenon is gaining ground because it is a convergent solution with Spanish.

== Morphology ==
The verb ser has three different forms in the present indicative: sonc (and not som, as is common in Mallorca), ets, és, sem (and not som), seu (and not sou), són.

The personal pronouns of the 1st and 2nd person plural are naltros and valtos. This fact brings it closer to Menorcan and distances it from the rest of Mallorcan, which has noltros and voltros.

== Lexicon ==
Sóller presents a series of innovations and lexical borrowings from French that make it very characteristic. As a result of immigration to the France, there are many French words, such as arramassar (to gather, to put together), burèu (desk), carrota (carrot), memé (grandmother), panaixé (mixed beer with lemon), peixe (peach), posta (post office), sac (bag). However, many French words are now out of use, only used by older people or only by people who have lived in France. Some of the most vivid French words in Sóller are arramassar, carrota, peixe and sac. This phenomenon of lexical borrowing from French due to contact with France also occurred in the town of S'Arracó in Andratx, where there was also a lot of immigration to the France.

In Sóller there are also a handful of own words that are not borrowed from French, such as albaïna (fine rain), babaiana (butterfly) and the expression fer una sota (to submerge in water, to throw oneself headlong). Other words known outside the town have a local pronunciation, such as cotrell (neck), xítxol (pea) (in other towns in Mallorca, xítxero) or bofoga (bump, blister).

== Bibliography ==
- Bibiloni, Gabriel (2016). El català de Mallorca. La fonètica. Palma de Mallorca: Lleonard Muntaner editor. ISBN 978-84-16554-04-1.
- Corbera, Jaume (1981). Els gal·licismes a la Vall de Sóller. Randa.
- Moll, Francesc de Borja (1990). El parlar de Mallorca. Palma de Mallorca: Moll. ISBN 8427306334.
- Montoya & Corbera, Brauli & Jaume (1998). L'efecte retorn dels antics emigrants mallorquins a França sobre el parlar de l'Arracó. Randa.
- Ramis Escanelles, Laia (2013). Els usos lingüístics en la parla de la Vall de Sóller (PDF). Coneixements, usos i representacions socials de la llengua catalana.
- Puigròs Caldentey, Maria Antònia (2001). Anàlisi del sistema vocàlic balear. Llengua & literatura. ISSN 0213-6554.
- Veny, Joan (1978). Els parlars catalans. Barcelona: Dopesa. ISBN 84-7235-388-5.
- Veny & Massanell, Joan & Mar (2015). Dialectologia catalana: aproximació pràctica als parlars catalans. Publicacions i Edicions de la Universitat de Barcelona. ISBN 9788447542017.
