= Sineu dialect =

Mallorcan dialect

Sineu
- sineuer
- Native to: Spain
- Region: Sineu
- Language family: Indo-European: Italic; Romance; Western Romance; Gallo-Romance; Occitano-Romance; Catalan; Eastern; Insular; Balearic; Mallorcan; Sineu
- Early forms: Proto-Indo-European: Proto-Italic; Old Latin; Vulgar Latin; Proto-Romance; Old Occitan; Old Catalan

Language codes
- ISO 639-3: –
- Glottolog: None
- Map of Sineu in Mallorca.

Sineu is a dialect of Catalan that is part of the Mallorcan subdialect, the Balearic dialect and the eastern block of Catalan. It is spoken in the town of Sineu and is characterized by vocalism, greatly affected by adjacent palatal consonants.

== Phonetics ==
=== Vocals ===
In Sineu, the palatal consonants (the /ɲ/ of canya, the /ʎ/ of callar, the /ʃ/ of caixa and the /ʒ/ of joc), the /k/, the /g/ and the vowels /ɛ/, /e/ and /i/ (also when not syllabic, as in (jo) of i a) systematically modify the sounds [a] and [ə] (the neutral vowel) when they precede them. In the case of the /a/ (which, as in the rest of Mallorcan and the entire Eastern bloc, only appears in tonic position), it closes in /ɛ/, while the [ə] (which, as in much of Balearic, appears in both tonic and unstressed positions) is advanced to [e]. Thus, the following results are obtained:

- /a/ tonic becomes /ɛ/: [ku'ɲɛðə] cunyeda cunyada (sister-in-law), ['ʎɛmp] lèmp llamp (lightning), [bə'ʃɛ] baixè baixar (to go down), ['ʒɛwmə] Jèume Jaume (James), ['kɛzə] quésa casa (house), ['gɛβi] guèbi gàbia (cage), [kɾi'ɛðə] crièda criada (maid), [be'ɛtə] beèta beata (blessed), [tə'ɛðə] taèda tallada (cut).
- /ə/ tonic becomes /e/: [bo'ɲet] bonyet, [ge'ʎet] gallet, [pə'ʃet] peixet, [pə'ʒes] pagès, [ri'kezə] riquesa, [əmi'ɣet] amiguet, [miɾəet] mirallet.
- [ə] unstressed becomes [e]: ['rəɲen] (ells) renyen (they) scold, ['eʎe] ella she, ['baʃen] (ells) baixen (they) go down, ['puʒen] (ells) pugen (they) go up, [kepə'ʎɛ] capellà priest, [əɣe'fa] agafar take, [mə'ɾie] Maria Mary, ['kɾeen] (ells) creen (they) create, [gi'nɛe] Guinea, ['ʒɔe] joia jewel.

It seems to be a phenomenon that appeared around the 17th century and was already consolidated by the 18th century.

A similar phenomenon to the closure of /a/ occurs in the Palma dialect, in which words such as ['ɟɛʎ] gall, ['cɛzi] quasi, [vi'ɛd͡ʒə] viatge or [di'ɛɾi] diari are pronounced with an open e, but here the phenomenon is not systematic, and does not occur with words such as ['camə] cama or [bə'ʃa] baixar. In the town of Lloret de Vistalegre, which was part of the municipality of Sineu until it became independent in 1922, the phenomenon has the same scope as in Palma de Mallorca, but does not reach as far as in Sineu.

=== Consonants ===
Contrary to what has often been said, in Sineu there is no palatalization of velar stops before a previous vowel and in final position (as it does in Palma de Mallorca, Manacor, Felanitx and the neighboring Lloret de Vistalegre and Sant Joan). However, it seems that it must be considered that, in the past, there was; this would explain why the aforementioned phonetic phenomena occur before sounds that are articulated with the palate very closed but also before /k/ and /g/, which are velars and, in the first place, there would be no reason for them to produce a closure of the following vowel.

Sineu, like in Balearic, is an iodized language. In addition, like Menorcan and certain towns in Mallorca such as Llucmajor, Campos, Sóller and Sa Pobla, it mutes the intervocalic /j/, so that words like cremalló and vermellura sound like cremaó and vermeüra. However, the /j/, before dropping, has had time to produce the phenomena of vowel closure described in the vocalism section; thus, palla has gone through the stages ['pajə] and ['paje] before becoming ['pae].

== Bibliography ==
- Bibiloni, Gabriel (2016). El català de Mallorca. La fonètica. Palma de Mallorca: Lleonard Muntaner editor. ISBN 978-84-16554-04-1.
- Caimari Frau, Francesca (1983). El vocalisme de Sineu (PDF). Maina.
- Puigròs Caldentey, Maria Antònia (2001). Anàlisi del sistema vocàlic balear. Llengua & literatura. ISSN 0213-6554.
- Veny & Massanell, Joan & Mar (2015). Dialectologia catalana: aproximació pràctica als parlars catalans. Publicacions i Edicions de la Universitat de Barcelona. ISBN 9788447542017.
