= Mallorcan dialect =

Dialect of Catalan spoken in Mallorca, Spain

Mallorcan
- Majorcan
- mallorquí
- Native to: Spain
- Region: Mallorca
- Language family: Indo-European: Italic; Romance; Western Romance; Gallo-Romance; Occitano-Romance; Catalan; Eastern; Insular; Balearic; Mallorcan
- Early forms: Proto-Indo-European: Proto-Italic; Old Latin; Vulgar Latin; Proto-Romance; Old Occitan; Old Catalan
- Dialects: Pollencí; Sóller; Felanitx; Sineu; Argentina; Palma; Botifarra †
- Writing system: Catalan

Language codes
- ISO 639-3: –
- ISO 639-6: mlrq
- Glottolog: mall1248 Mallorquí
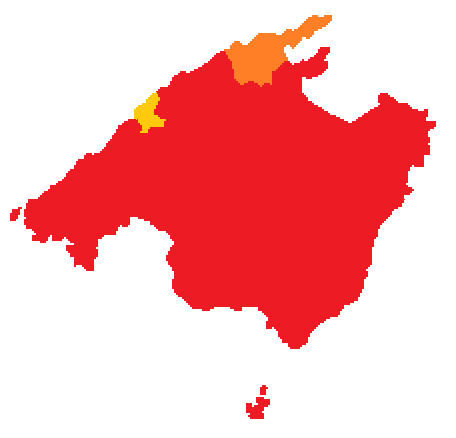
- Map of the main varieties of Mallorcan.

Mallorcan or Majorcan (Catalan: mallorquí) is the subdialect of Balearic spoken on the island of Mallorca, which is part of the Balearic dialect and the eastern block of Catalan. Balearic as a whole is a consecutive dialect formed by colonization of the Central Catalan area. Like Menorcan, Ibizan and Algherese, its isolation makes it a lateral area, which has meant that it has not been affected by many innovations from the continent and, on the contrary, contains a good number of active dialectalisms unknown outside the island.

== History ==
The substrate of Mallorcan Catalan is different from that of continental Catalan in terms of pre-Roman material, since it comes from the Talaiotic culture, but there are only limited remains of it in the toponymy. It is not known for sure whether, among the toponymy, there is anything Germanic (Vandalic) and Greek (from the Roman domination of the East). Many more toponyms remain from the Arabic element than from the pre-Roman substrates, but there was possibly not much influence of Insular Arabic on the current Catalan of Mallorca due to the fact that, possibly, most of the Arabisms of Mallorcan were imported during the repopulation. Alongside the Arabisms there is the Berber element, increasingly known, coming from the first Muslim colonization and the subsequent Almoravid and Almohad dominations. As for the remains of Latin, the last stage of which disappeared with Arabization, they are also abundant in toponymy, under the increasingly criticized name of Mozarabisms; they have recently been revised and their number has decreased, as well as in the common lexicon, where their identification is not always certain. All this means that three strata can be identified in the Mallorcan toponymy before the Conquest: a final Arab stratum (to which some Amazigh element can be added), an earlier stratum belonging to the Latin toponyms before the Islamic conquest, and a first stratum to which the pre-Roman toponyms belong.

The Catalan repopulation of Mallorca from 1229 onwards led to a change in the population that marginalised the native population capable of transmitting the remains of the previous languages, not only of the common lexicon but also of the toponymy: many toponyms were forgotten or were replaced by Catalan toponyms, and in other cases the location was wrong or they were poorly transmitted through transcriptions in Latinised forms. The dialectal features of Mallorcan are, therefore, mostly passive , coming mainly from the salty Empordà Catalan and, a minority, from the relations with the Catalan counties of the North Pyrenees, which were within the Crown of Mallorca. The origin of some of these dialectalisms, however, could be the relations with the Occitan properties of the Crown of Mallorca itself, especially with Montpellier. As for active dialectalisms, their study will have to determine their origin (the influence of the medieval Italian colonies in the city of Mallorca has not yet been evaluated).

Knowledge of the formation of the Mallorcan dialect therefore depends on historical studies, especially from sources that report informal oral records, and especially royal court books and data and receipts. These sources, and some formal ones, give us news of the existence of dialectal features that have disappeared today. The most interesting object of study is the origin and chronology of the dialectalisms active in the phonetic system, none of which has a general diffusion on the island.

From a chronological point of view, some passive dialectalisms represent medieval stages of the general language or Eastern Catalan, therefore identified with the classical language.

The existence of some Mallorcanisms is already attested to in the Regles d'esquivar vocables o mots grossers o pagesívols (c. 1492), alongside the existence of forms specific to other regions, characteristic of vulgar language. Alongside this identification, however, there are testimonies of the consideration of the purity of the Catalan language in the Balearic Islands, in the Crònica of the Empordà native Ramon Muntaner, and in the work of the Tortosa native Cristòfor Despuig Los Col·loquis de la insigne ciutat de Tortosa (1557), which attributes it to geographical isolation.

The existence of dialectal features was not reflected in the appearance of a specific name for the dialectal variety. The first name of the Catalan language with the Mallorcan gentilic appears in the prologue of the translation of Cicero's Paradoxes by Ferran Valentí . Valentí contrasts the popular, local and familiar character of Catalan to the universality of the Latin language, which he calls "vulgar materno e Mallorquí segons la ciutat on só nat e criat e nodrit" (1450). "Mallorquí" therefore refers to the Catalan of the city of Mallorca, learned by Valentí from his mother and from the streets and squares. Furthermore, in the same work, Valentí makes an explicit statement of the Catalanity of the Mallorcan Ramon Llull, the Valencian Nicolau Quilis and the Barcelonan Bernat Metge, whom he considers to be of the same nationality. The later texts in which the name Mallorcan and the Mallorcan language appear do not present dialectal features; these names are therefore a reflection of the administrative organization, of the title of Kingdom of Mallorca. This is a parallel case to the use of the name Valencian and the Valencian language in the Kingdom of Valencia.

== Phonetics ==
=== Vocalism ===
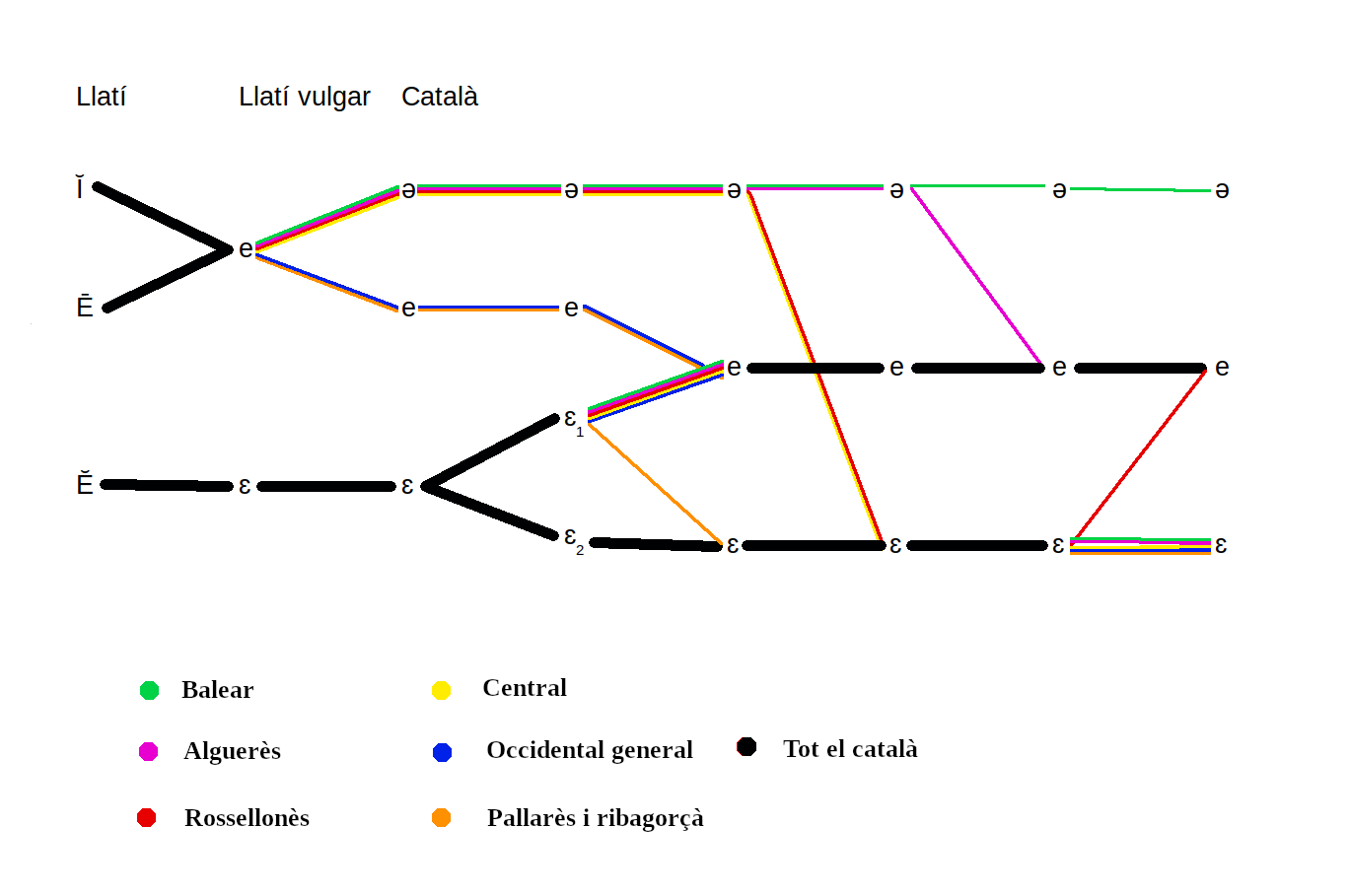
Evolution of the e in Catalan.

Mallorcan has eight stressed vowels. The stressed vowels of Mallorcan are the original system of the Eastern block , which has remained unchanged. Thus, Latin Ē and Ĭ (the closed e /e/ of Vulgar Latin) are /ə/ in Mallorcan (PLĒNUM > pl[ə], PĬRA > p[ə]ra), while, as in the rest of Catalan, part of Latin Ĕ (the open e /ɛ/ of Vulgar Latin) is /ɛ/ (TĔRRA > t[ɛ]rra) and the other is /e/ (TĔMPUS > t[e]mps). The preservation of this vowel system is shared with Eastern Ibizan and Western Menorcan . In turn, the towns of Alaró, Binissalem and Lloseta have followed the example of central Catalan and the eastern half of Menorca and the western half of Ibiza and have evolved the system, so that the neutral e has become open /ɛ/ in tonic position.

In general, the open e /ɛ/ and the open o /ɔ/, as in Valencian, are slightly more open than in Central Catalan.

Regarding unstressed vocalism:

- The o does not suffer vowel reduction in unstressed position, unlike the rest of the eastern dialects and like the western dialects; in fact, Mallorcan is the only dialect of the eastern block with this characteristic. In Mallorcan, therefore, dove is pronounced [kolóm]. However, in the dialect of Sóller there is reduction of o to u in unstressed position.
- In certain localities, however, the o does close in u in unstressed position when i or u appears in an adjacent syllable; thus, coixí and comú, in certain towns are pronounced [kuʃí] and [kumú]. This phenomenon, a vowel harmony caste , is shared by most of Western Catalan and is already detected in the old language. On the contrary, in the town of Manacor and in the traditional speech of Palma de Mallorca there is a tendency to overcorrect this phenomenon, and thus pronunciations such as fogir and estodiar are frequent.
- Although, like the entire eastern block of Catalan, /a/, /ɛ/, /e/ and /ə/, in unstressed position, are neutralized into [ə], there is a certain tendency not to neutralize /e/. Thus, in those cases in which the morphology allows the recovery of the timbre /e/ in stressed position, /e/ often does not suffer vowel reduction, and one says [pe'ɣa] pegar, [kɾe'ma] cremar and [pe'ʃət] peixet. This phenomenon is exclusive to Mallorcan among all the eastern dialects, but does not occur systematically.
- The neutral vowel, in contact with a palatal consonant, tends to close in i in certain words, such as [ki'ʃal] queixal, [ʒi'kətə] jaqueta, [gi'ʎətə] galleta. This phenomenon is partially shared with Northwestern Catalan and it is not a systematic phenomenon either.

Share with all Balearic Catalan :

- The neuter vowel is delayed to o when o appears in an adjacent syllable: home and knee (genoll) become homo and jonoll.
- Unstressed finals in /iə/ suffer the dropping of the final /ə/, and thus memória and gràcia become memori and graci. However, it does not occur in the town of Felanitx.
- The group /wə/ becomes /o/, and thus aigua, quaranta and llengua become aigo, coranta and llengo.

=== Consonantism ===
Mallorcan has several features that it shares with all Balearic Catalan:

- Iodization, that is, which distinguishes the Latin groups LL, which becomes /ʎ/ (GALLUM > ga[ʎ]), with respect to C'L, G'L and LI, which become /j/ (AURĬC'LA > ore[j]a). It is worth noting that this /j/ falls between certain vowels and, in some towns, is completely elided (as in Menorca): palla is ['paə] and orella is [o'ɾəə] or [o'ɾə]. In the rest of the localities, this /j/ is pronounced noticeably lower, almost like a semi-vowel /e/. The localities that completely elided the /j/ between vowels are Llucmajor, Campos, Porreres, Montuïri, Vilafranca de Bonany, Sineu, Ariany, Maria de la Salut, Santa Margalida, Llubí, Muro, Sa Pobla, Búger, Campanet, Sóller and Fornalutx.
- Distinction between /b/ and /v/.
- Maintenance without palatalization of the old tl group in words like batle and ametla. There are also many geminate l's, such as al·lot, camamil·la and cel·la. In general, in Mallorca, the l is of dental articulation , and not alveolar, as in the rest of Catalan. In implosive position, the l can be vocalized into u, and thus espelma is called espeuma and alzina, auzina; this was already happening in Old Catalan.

Other consonantal phenomena that characterize Mallorcan are:

- As in Menorcan and Valencian, the groups -nt, -rt, -lt, -mp and -nk (jugant, port, alt, camp and blanc) are maintained.
- Drop of almost all r in final position: mar is pronounced [ma] and cor, [kɔ].
- In some speakers, the u intervocalic /w/ can become a fricative : diuen > diven. An antihiatic v can also appear in certain vowel contacts: ravó and cova for ração and coa.
- The s followed by a voiced consonant can become r (rhotacism of the s), and thus bisbe and fantasma can become birbe and fantarma. Also if a word ending in s is followed by a word beginning with a voiced consonant: és meu [əɾmew].
- Metathesis of the r occurs in several words that begin with a bilabial consonant: words like pebre, padrí and podrir can be articulated prebe, pradí and prodir. In pebre and padrí it is more common than in words like pedra and pobre.
- In several localities, the consonants /k/ and /g/ have a much more advanced articulation when followed by a non-back vowel, that is, [i], [e], [ə] and [a], a sound that is usually transcribed [c] and [ɟ] ([ʝ] in the approximate version). Thus, casa, paga and vaquer are pronounced ['cazə], ['paʝə] and [və'ce]. This phenomenon occurs in the towns of Ses Salines, Santanyí, Felanitx, Manacor, Sant Llorenç des Cardassar, Sant Joan, Lloret de Vistalegre, Pollença, Algaida, Valldemossa, Puigpunyent, Calvià, in Marratxí and in the traditional speech of Palma.
- It is very common in Mallorcan, as well as in Menorcan, that there are more consonant assimilations than in the rest of the dialects. Thus, capsa, acció, exèrcit and dissabte are pronounced ['katsə], [ətsi'o], [ə'dzɛɾsit] and [di'satte]; it also occurs between two words: sac buit is [sabbujt] and set carros is [sɛkkaros].

== Morphology ==
Mallorcan shares with all Balearic a series of conservations (possibly due to their insularity) of Old Catalan in terms of morphology.

=== Nominal morphology ===
- The definite article is the article salat (except in the town of Pollença), which takes the forms es in the masculine (pronounced [əd͡z] in the plural before a vowel), sa and ses in the feminine and so and sos in the masculine when it follows the preposition amb (with no sound). However, the literary article is not unknown there, but is used in certain specific cases. The use of the article salat is shared with other Catalan and other Romance languages.
- In front of people, the personal article is used, which takes the forms en (n' in front of a vowel) for the masculine and na for the feminine, a feature shared with all of Balearic Catalan and part of central Catalan.
- Generally, weak pronouns take the full form me, te, se, vos, mos and ne. However, in the past they alternated with the reduced forms after words ending in a vowel, and thus one said me rent sa cara but no (e)m rentaré sa cara; this system, which was typical of Old Catalan and Classical Catalan, has almost disappeared.
- The personal pronouns in the plural are noltros and voltros, as in Menorca.
- Elision of the n in the plurals of flat words, unlike Western and Ibizan: ases and joves, not àsens and jóvens.
- Mallorcan, like Menorcan, has preserved the plurals without epenthesis o of words like bosc and gust, which make the plural boscs and gusts (pronounced [bɔts] and [guts]).
- In weak verb+pronoun clitic groups, the accent falls on the pronoun: escoltar-vós, parlar-nè, agafa-là, entrà-hi (with [ə] stress). This phenomenon serves to avoid esdrúixoles and sobreesdrúixoles.
- On the other hand, Mallorcan has lost the classic weak pronoun combination system that Valencian still preserves, and is unaware of combinations of the type li'l, li la, li ho, which it replaces with l'hi [li].

=== Verbal morphology ===
- Like the rest of Balearic and Alguerese , Mallorcan has preserved the zero morpheme of the 1st person present indicative: jo cant, jo rep, jo dorm. This fact leads to forms of difficult pronunciation such as jo umpl, jo sobr, which are resolved by consonant assimilations.
- Like the rest of Balearic, Mallorcan has also preserved the vowel a for the 1st and 2nd persons of the plural of the indicative in the first conjugation: cantam, cantau (and thus distinguish them from those of the subjunctive: cantem, canteu). In addition, it has also preserved the vowel in the past subjunctive: cantàs instead of cantés; this feature is shared with Ibizan.
- The verbs dir, dur, riure, fer, creure, veure, treure, riure and modernly caure, in the 1st and 2nd persons of the plural of the present indicative, take the forms deim and deis, duim and duis, reim and reis, feim and feis, etc. Vulgarly, the verb estar (esteim and esteis) and the imperfect indicative (dèieis and rèieis instead of dèieu and rèieu) can also take these forms.
- Towards the 19th century, the most rural Mallorcan language preserved almost intact the classical subjunctive of the type que jo cant, que tu cants, que jo puga, que tu pugues. However, the subjunctive in -i was not unknown there, and from very early on it must have been well used in the first conjugation: que jo canti, que tu cantis. In the 2nd and 3rd conjugations, the classical subjunctive was maintained more, but today it is almost never heard, and thus one says que jo pugui, que tu puguis. This subjunctive is common to all of Eastern Catalan, but throughout the territory it is of modern development (although it may be older in origin).
- Inchoative verbs preserve the distinction between velar and palatal forms: jo cresc, tu creixes, ell creix (and, usually, que jo cresqui). This feature is shared with the rest of Balearic and Valencian.

== Syntax ==
Often, the order of weak pronouns is direct object + indirect object: el te duc, les se menjaran, la te'n duràs. This system was typical of Classical Catalan.

In general, Mallorcan has a preference for clitic climbing: el vol comprar is preferred to vol comprar-lo, to the point that a Mallorcan speaker might often consider the second variant as ungrammatical. This contrasts with Valencian , which prefers the other form.

Until the 20th century , the use of the auxiliary ser, typical of Classical Catalan, was preserved instead of haver to create compound tenses with the past participle in verbs of motion, in transitive verbs in reflexive version and in copulative verbs: Som arribat (for He arribat), Ses nines se són vestides (for Ses nines s'han vestit). Currently, it can only be heard in older speakers.

== Lexicon ==
The words that characterize the Mallorcan lexicon can be grouped into three blocks:

- Words that it has preserved from Old Catalan and that most of the other dialects have lost: acotar, adesar 'ordenar', ca, llinatge 'cognom', partir 'anar-se'n'.
- Exclusive words from Mallorcan that are innovations (active dialectalisms): al·lot 'persona jove', atxem 'esternut', aviat 'ràpid', brutor, capfico 'acte de capbussar-se', curolla 'dèria', doi 'estupidesa', horabaixa, importar 'caldre' (only in negative sentences: no importa 'no cal'), nigul 'núvol', tassó 'got', tudar 'malgastar'.
- Words that Mallorcan shares with other dialects:
  - With the Western bloc (or part of it): granera 'escombra', bres, arena 'sorra', calces 'mitges', padrí 'avi'.
  - With Valencian: manco 'menys', escurar 'rentar els plats', fraula 'manduixa', amollar 'deixar anar'.
  - With Balearic, in general: besada 'bes', devora 'al costat', moix 'gat', trempar 'amanir'.
  - With Ibizan: indiot 'gall d'indi', greixonera 'mena de cassola', barral 'garrafa'.
  - It is with the Minorcan that it has the most lexical affinities of all: doblers 'diners', embullar 'embolicar, complicar', empegueir-se 'sentir vergonya', enfora 'lluny', espira 'espurna', frissar 'tenir pressa', llenegar 'relliscar', moscard 'mosquit', renou 'soroll'.

== Dialects ==
=== Evolved tonic vocalism in Mallorcan ===
In the Mallorcan towns of Binissalem, Alaró and Lloseta the typical tonic vowelism of Mallorcan, with eight vowels, has evolved towards a system of only seven tonic vowels, so that the neutral vowel /ə/ has converged into /ɛ/, in the same way as it happened in Western Ibizan , in Maonese and in Central . In Mallorca, the phenomenon is of fairly recent date, as it is thought to have appeared towards the beginning of the 19th century, possibly as an innovation from Alaró. From Alaró it would have spread to Binissalem (from where there is news that, at the beginning of the 19th century, it was not yet done) and Lloseta (which until 1842 depended on Binissalem). On the other hand, there is news that this feature also occurred in the towns of Porreres and Ariany; It is possible that it was a generational phenomenon adopted by the day laborers from Porreres and Ariany who were hired to work on the Alaron and Binissalem estates, and that in their towns of origin it was perceived as a foreign and unprestigious trait and was therefore abandoned. In the village of Biniamar, near Lloseta, it was also done, but today it is never heard of.

Currently, the trait is still alive in the three towns, but it seems to be losing strength due to immigration, both of Catalan speakers from the rest of Mallorca (who do not have this vocalism) and of foreigners who do not speak Catalan. Currently, Alaró and, especially, Lloseta and Binissalem are on the way to becoming a dormitory town for many people from Palma, which means that the natives are not enough to exert pressure that would make the newcomers adapt to the local speech.

The existence of this characteristic is well present in the consciousness of all Mallorcans; thus, the people of Alaron, Binissalem and Llosetín take it as an element that identifies them as a people.

=== Sóller ===
The speech of Sóller is fundamentally characterized because, unlike the rest of Mallorca and like the other three islands and all of central Catalan, it neutralizes unstressed /ɔ/, /o/ and /u/ into /u/. In addition, it has a whole series of particular lexical elements, a good part of which are words borrowed from French at the time when many people from Sóller emigrated to the France to seek their fortune.

=== Pollencí ===
The speech of Pollencí is characterized by the fact that it is the only Balearic speech that does not have the article salat, but uses the article derived from the Latin demonstrative ille, which in Pollencí takes the masculine form u for the singular and u and us for the plural.

=== Felanitx ===
Felanitx speech is characterized by the fact that it has reduced the number of stressed vowels to seven, after converging the open e /ɛ/ and the closed e /e/ into a closed e /e/ and restructuring the vowel triangle, so that in the lower part there are two elements, a /a/ a little more advanced and a little higher and a /ɔ/ a little more central and a little lower.

=== Sineu ===
Sineu's speech is characterized by the fact that he closes the /a/ into /ɛ/ and advances the [ə] into [e] after a palatal consonant or a closed vowel.

=== Palma ===
The traditional speech of Palma is a variety of Mallorcan spoken in Palma de Mallorca, quite heterogeneous, associated with the urban classes and which is on the verge of disappearing to the detriment of a more neutral and, in many cases, more Castilianized Mallorcan.

=== Botifarra ===
The Mallorcan nobility (often called Botifarra) spoke a sociolect that was their own, which, due to the Hispanicization and the collapse of the nobility as a social class, has disappeared today. It was a speech that served as an element of identity of the group and that its speakers used to distinguish themselves from the rest of the urban social classes, especially the mossons.

=== Argentina ===
Argentine Mallorcan is a variant spoken in San Pedro, Buenos Aires, from the late 19th century and into the 20th century, brought by a colony of people from Manacor and Felanitx. In 2014, there were inhabitants who still preserved the language.

Among the phonetic features of Catalan speakers in San Pedro, the most important is the hesitant aspiration of the /s/ in final syllable or word position, in the same way as in Rioplatense Spanish (ca nostra > ca nohtra). Many loanwords from Rioplatense Spanish are also used.

== Bibliography ==
- Bibiloni, Gabriel (2016). El català de Mallorca. La fonètica (in Catalan). Palma: Lleonard Muntaner editor. ISBN 978-84-16554-04-1.
- Grimalt Gomila, Josep (2009). Els articles en el parlar de Mallorca (in Catalan). Vol. 31. Estudis Romànics. pp. 55–75.
- Francesc de Borja Moll i Casasnovas (1980). El parlar de Mallorca (in Catalan). Palma: Moll. ISBN 8427306334.
- Francesc de Borja Moll i Casasnovas (2006). Gramàtica històrica catalana (in Catalan). University of the Balearic Islands. ISBN 978-84-370-6412-3.
- Montoya, Brauli (1995). "L'Observació del canvi fonològic en el català balear". La sociolingüística de la variació (in Catalan). Barcelona: Promociones y Publicaciones Universitarias. pp. 165–220.
- Pol Pons, Mireia (2016). Anàlisi del tractament actual de les 'ə i 'ɛ en el parlar de Binissalem (PDF) (Thesis) (in Catalan). University of the Balearic Islands.
- Puigròs Caldentey, Maria Antònia (2001). Anàlisi del sistema vocàlic balear (in Catalan). Llengua & literatura. pp. 105–125. ISSN 0213-6554.
- Veny & Massanell, Joan & Mar (2015). Dialectologia catalana: aproximació pràctica als parlars catalans (in Catalan). Publicacions i Edicions de la Universitat de Barcelona. ISBN 9788447542017.
- Joan Veny i Clar (1978). Els parlars catalans (in Catalan). Barcelona: Dopesa. ISBN 84-7235-388-5.
