= Botifarra (Mallorca) =

Nobility of Mallorca

Botifarra is the popular name given in Mallorca to any member of the old Mallorcan nobility. It is considered that the name could be a derivation of Botifler, a term used to describe supporters of Philip V of Spain during the War of the Spanish Succession. The generic meaning that the word later took on was due to the position of a significant part of the Mallorcan nobility in favor of Philip V and against the defenders of the liberties and privileges of the Kingdom of Majorca. On the contrary, the Austracist cause had a marked popular character on the island.

== Botifarra dialect ==
Botifarra
- botifarres
- Native to: Spain
- Region: Palma de Mallorca, Mallorca
- Ethnicity: Botifarra
- Extinct: 20th century
- Language family: Indo-European: Italic; Romance; Western Romance; Gallo-Romance; Occitano-Romance; Catalan; Eastern; Insular; Balearic; Mallorcan; Botifarra
- Early forms: Proto-Indo-European: Proto-Italic; Old Latin; Vulgar Latin; Proto-Romance; Old Occitan; Old Catalan
- Writing system: Catalan

Language codes
- ISO 639-3: –
- Glottolog: None

The Mallorcan aristocracy, most of whom resided in Palma de Mallorca, had traditionally been characterized by a sociolect of their own, which distinguished them not only from the common people but also from the enriched Bourgeoisie; in part, the fact of having their own speech that identified them was one of the things that, when the class system of the Ancien régime began to fall,^{[1]} gave them an identity as a social group.

=== Historical factors ===
The Mallorcan nobility, unlike the Valencian or even Barcelonan nobility, became Hispanicized very late, until well into the 20th century, which has allowed their speech to be studied. In terms of their relationships and contacts, the nobility was familiar with the language of the peasants and the countryside, as they all had possessions outside the town that they often visited, as well as being in close contact with the so-called mallorquí de trona, that is, the ecclesiastical estate, and also with the Spanish language,^{[2]} the language of the administration and state officials. On the other hand, the speech of the Mallorcan aristocrats was supposedly far removed from the language of the common people and, especially, of the mossons, the small and middle bourgeoisie with aspirations to rise socially.

=== Linguistic features ===
- The language of the botifarras presented a vowel reduction of the /o/ in contexts such as conill, coixí, costum, pronounced [ku'ni], [kuʃí] and [kumú]. This distanced it from the speech of the people of the plain of Palma, while bringing it closer to the speech of the Part Forana.
- The Mallorcan nobility mostly maintained the classical present subjunctive of verbs of the 2nd and 3rd conjugation: que jo faça, que jo puga, que jo servesca. This fact contrasts with urban speech, which was the first to adopt the new subjunctive in -i in all conjugations.
- It was a speech with a richer range of treatments; thus, the vós was distinguished from the vostè, and various formulas appeared such as vossa mercè.
- In terms of vocabulary, they used certain words that were their own. Thus, the Mallorcan nobility addressed their grandparents as senyoravi (while the people of the plains used padrí), preserved words such as fraula 'maduixa' (strawberry) (which the people of the plains had replaced with the Spanish fressa) and also adopted their own Castilianisms.

== Les Nou Cases ==
The Les Nou Cases were considered to be the nine highest noble families in Mallorca, which is shown in the name translating to "Nine Houses". The concept of nine families comes from legend, which states that the families are descendants of those that benefited from the Conquest of Majorca by James I of Aragon, who divided the island into nine parts, as stated in the Llibre del Repartiment (Majorca).

After the War of Succession, an alliance was formed between the main aristocratic families, which received the name of Les Nou Cases because it was initially made up of nine lineages: the Berga , the Cotoner (Marquises of Ariany), the Dameto (Marquises of Bellpuig), the Safortesa (Marquises of Verger), the Sales , the Sureda and the Sureda de Santmartí (Marquises of Vivot and Marquises of Vilafranca), the Togores (Counts of Aiamans) and the Verí. For a time, these nine families formed the elite of the Mallorcan Botifarra.

== Notes ==
^{1} Llorenç Villalonga i Pons's work entitled Mort de dama is a portrait of this social change.
^{2} The fact that they did not abandon Catalan as a language for internal use and intergenerational transmission does not mean that they did not know Spanish; in fact, it was essential for them to maintain their position of power, since all contacts with the royal power had to be in Spanish. For this reason, the Spanishization of the language of the plain people came, in part, by imitating the language of the aristocrats.
