= Valencian dialects =

Valencian dialects may refer to:

- The Valencian varieties (see also Catalan dialects#Valencian dialects) spoken in the Valencian Community (a.k.a. Valencian Country)
- Restrictively, the Catalan dialects spoken throughout the Catalan-speaking territories
