= Joan Veny i Clar =

Catalan dialectologist

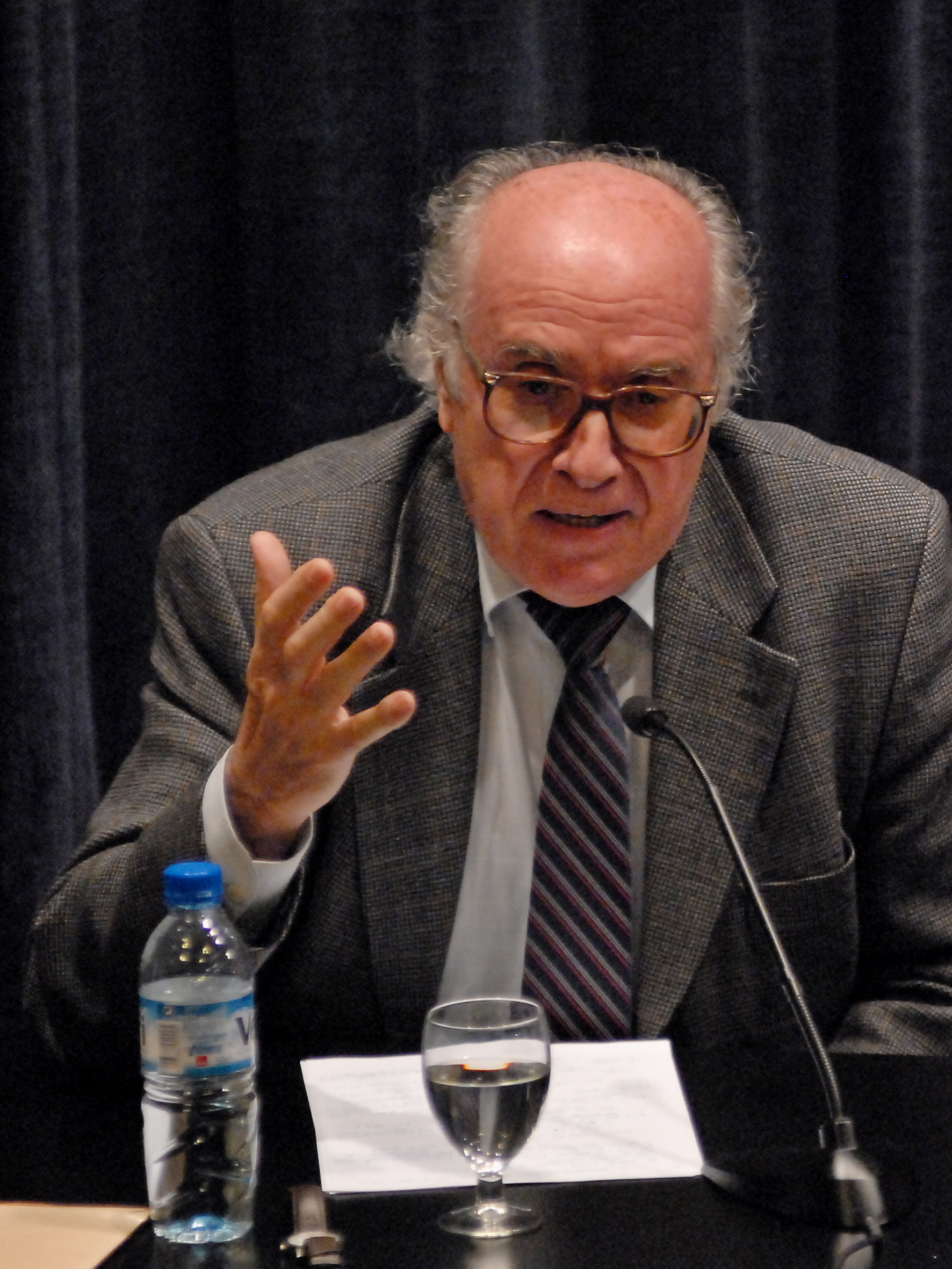
- Born: 22 August 1932; Campos, Majorca
- Occupations: professor, linguist

Joan Veny i Clar (Campos, Majorca, on 22 August 1932) is a linguist and Catalan dialectologist from Majorca, considered one of the most prestigious and renowned of the Catalan Countries. He is the author of Els parlars catalans, an essential book for Catalan dialectology, synthesis of the dialectal variation of the entire space of the Catalan Countries; and furthermore a dense and rich work, made in conjunction with Lydia Pons: Linguistic Atlas of the Catalan Domain.

== Biography ==
He is emeritus professor of Catalan Philology at the University of Barcelona. In addition to this university, he studied at Louvain and Poitiers universities. He received his doctorate in Romance philology in 1956 with the thesis Paralelismos léxicos en los dialectos catalanes directed by Antoni M. Badia i Margarit and published in 1960. His research in the field of dialectology is leading with regard to the Catalan language, especially after edition of Els parlars catalans (in 1978), which establishes a synthesis of the dialectal variation of the Catalan language across his domain. That same year he became a member of the Institute for Catalan Studies. He has been devoted, moreover, to the edition of historical texts (Regiment de preservació de pestilència, by James d'Agramunt, s. XIV, published in 1971) and to the history of the Catalan language, with special attention to etymology. He has published numerous articles on Catalan linguistics, especially on dialectology (Catalan in general and Majorcan in particular), geolinguistics and etymology; in this field, he has devoted several studies to ictonymia (fish and fishing words); he has participated in many congresses.

He is director of the Linguistic Atlas of the Catalan Domain (ALDC), a research project of the Institute for Catalan Studies on dialect diversity, prepared in conjunction with Lydia Pons i Griera and initiated by Antoni Maria Badia i Margarit, the result of which, a nine-volume work, has been in the process of publication since 1998 and can be consulted on (ALDC). He is also one of the most prominent members of the Atlas Linguistique Roman team, as well as responsible for the Catalan part of various international research programs in the field of geolinguistics.

He is a doctor honoris causa by the University of Valencia (2008) and the University of the Balearic Islands (2016). He has been awarded the Creu de Sant Jordi de la Generalitat de Catalunya (1997), the Fundació Institució Catalana de Support a la Recerca award (2004), the Medalla d'Honor de la Xarxa Vives d'Universitats (2013) and the Premi d'Honor de les Lletres Catalanes (2015), among other awards and distinctions. Campos' school is named after him.

== Work ==
- Estudis de geolingüística catalana (1978).
- Els parlars catalans (1978).
- Introducció a la dialectologia catalana (1986).
- Dialectologia filològica. Transfusió lèxica. Llengua escrita i dialectalismes (1993)
- La lliçó lingüística de Maria Antònia Salvà (1995)
- Francesc de B. Moll: ciència i humanitat (1995)
- Onomàstica i dialectologia (1996)
- Aproximació al dialecte eivissenc (1999)
- Llengua històrica i llengua estàndard (2001)
- Contacte i contrast de llengües i dialectes (2006)
- Escrits lingüístics mallorquins (2007)
- De geolingüística i etimologia romànica (2012)
- Linguistic Atlas of the Catalan Domain (ALDC) (2001 – en curs). 7 volumes.
- Petit Atles Lingüístic del Domini Català (2007 – in process). 4 volumes.

== Awards ==
- Creu de Sant Jordi (1997)
- Fundació Catalana per a la Recerca Award(2004)
- Medalla d'Honor de la Xarxa Vives d'Universitats (2013)
- Premi d'Honor de les Lletres Catalanes (2015)
- Medalla d'Or de la Comunitat Autònoma de les Illes Balears (2017)
- Premi Pompeu Fabra (2012)
