= Francesc de Borja Moll i Casasnovas =

Catalan linguist, philologist and editor

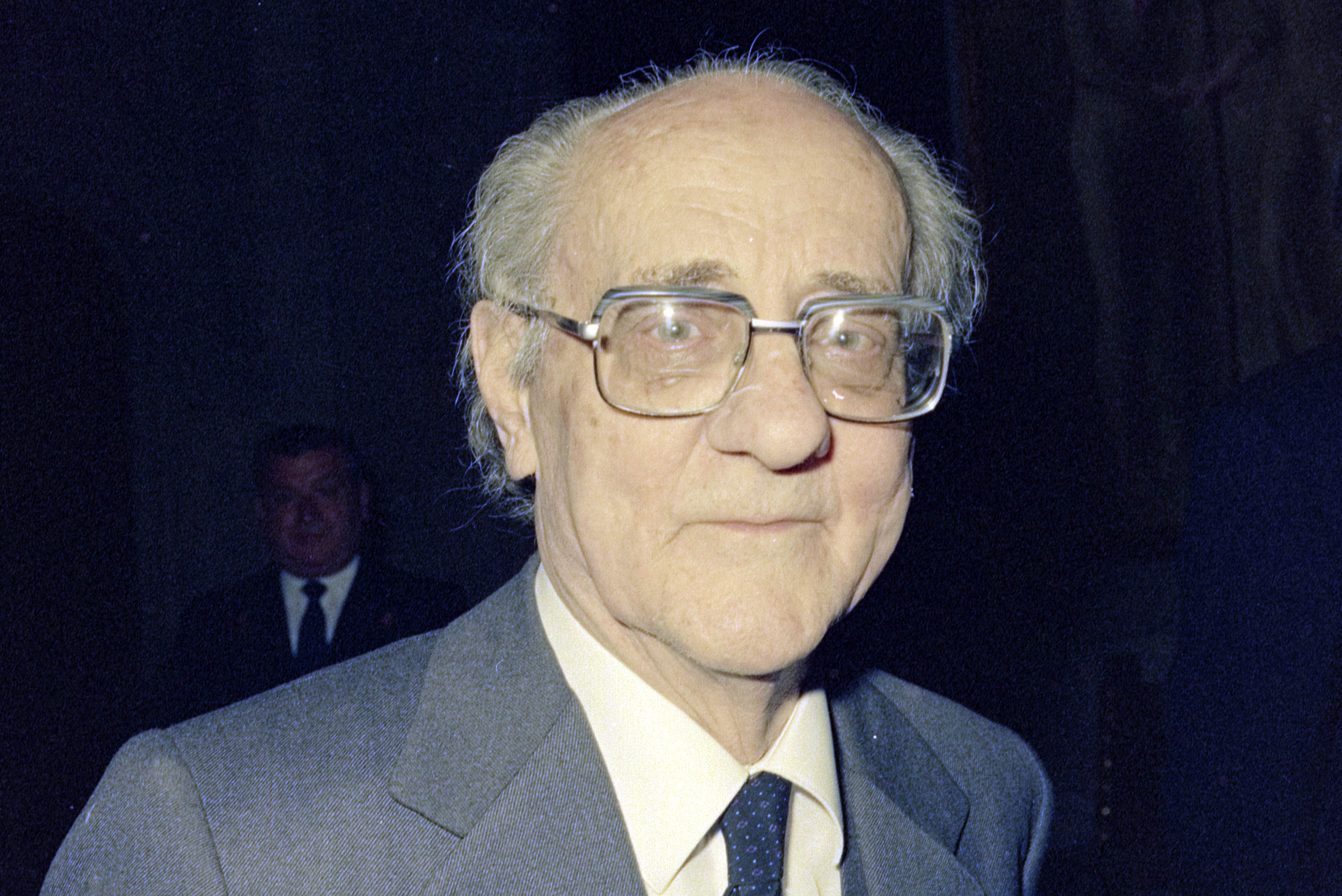
Francesc de Borja Moll i Casasnovas (1983)

Francesc de Borja Moll Casanovas (10 October 1903 – 18 February 1991) was a Catalan linguist, philologist and editor from Menorca. He wrote many books on the Catalan language and its varieties spoken on the Balearic Islands. He was also the main collaborator with Father Antoni Maria Alcover in his Diccionari català-valencià-balear (Catalan-Valencian-Balearic Dictionary).

== Biography ==
Moll was born in 1903 in Ciutadella de Menorca, Balearic Islands, Spain, the seventh child of Josep Moll Vidal and Maria-Anna Casanovas Oliver. As their first five children died before reaching the age of five, Francesc was very protected as a child. In his book Els meus primers trenta anys, he writes that his parents, along with his godmother and brother, were the most important figures in his life.

Between 1908 and 1911, he learnt to read and write with his teacher, Miquel Villalonga, and he began to learn basic drawing skills. His father also played a part in his education, enforcing his love for the Catalan language. In 1912 he enrolled in a school of theology in Ciutadella de Menorca, focusing on the humanities and specialising in Latin. He was only taught in Spanish, and writes in Els meus primers trenta anys that he doesn't remember ever being taught about the Catalan language, history, or culture, and never studied Catalan literature or learned to write Catalan, only learning of the existence of Jacint Verdaguer. As a result, when he began to write professionally, he couldn't imagine doing it in his native Catalan.

The arrival of Father Antoni Maria Alcover at the seminary was a turning point for Moll. Alcover had travelled to Menorca with the intention of studying the different dialects of the island and incorporating them into the dictionary he was writing at the time, which Moll would later become the co-writer of. Although he never studied at university, collaborating with Alcover allowed him to meet German linguists such as Meyer Lübke, Leo Spitzer and Bernhard Schädel. In 1921, he moved to Mallorca to work on the dictionary. Upon the death of Alcover in 1932, Moll continued work on the dictionary and the accompanying Bolletí, to which he applied the orthographical norms of Pompeu Fabra, which Alcover had previously not used due to his disagreement with the Institute of Catalan Studies.

Although Alcover played an important role in Moll's Catalan studies, his strong personality caused problems in the linguistic community. The Institute of Catalan Studies didn't mention the Catalan-Valencian-Balearic Dictionary at all at its launch. Alcover had also created his own publisher, which would later become Editorial Moll.

After being conscripted, he served on the Republican side in the Spanish Civil War.

Moll aimed to make Catalan more appreciated and widely taught, focusing most of his work on grammar, vocabulary and Catalan language courses. He also notably contributed to the founding of the Obra Cultural Balear, an important Catalan language organization on the Balearic Islands.

Moll died in Palma de Mallorca on 18 February 1991.

== Main works ==
- Suplement català al "Romanisches etymologisches wörterbuch" (1931)
- Cançons populars mallorquines (1934)
- Rudiments de gramàtica normativa (1952)
- Gramàtica històrica catalana (1952)
- Els llinatges catalans (1959, ISBN 84-273-0425-0)
- Un home de combat: Mossèn Alcover (1962)
- Epistolari del Bisbe Carsalade a Mossèn Alcover (1965, ISBN 84-273-4042-7)
- Cinc temes menorquins (1979)
- Els meus primers trenta anys 1903-1934 (1970, ISBN 84-273-0201-0)
- Polèmica d'en Pep Gonella (1972).
- L'home per la paraula (1974, ISBN 84-273-0371-8)
- Els altres quaranta anys 1935-1974 (1975, ISBN 84-273-0408-0)
- Diccionari Català-Castellà (1977)
- Diccionari Castellà-Català (1978)
- El parlar de Mallorca (1980, ISBN 84-273-0633-4)
- Textos i estudis medievals (1982, ISBN 84-7202-517-9)
- Aspectes marginals d'un home de combat (Mossèn Alcover) (1983)
- "Autobiografía intelectual", Anthropos 44, 1984, p. 7.
- "L'aventura editorial d'un filòleg", Anthropos44, 1984, p. 17.
- Curso breve de español para extranjeros: elemental (1991, ISBN 84-273-0030-1)
- Curso breve de español para extranjeros: superior (1991, ISBN 84-273-0349-1)
- Promptuari d'ortografia (1999, ISBN 84-273-0032-8)
- Epistolari Joan Coromines-Francesc de Borja Moll (2000)
- Diccionari escolar Català-Castellà, Castellà-Català (2001, ISBN 84-273-0836-1)
- Exercicis de gramàtica (ISBN 84-273-0180-4)
- Gramàtica catalana (ISBN 84-273-0044-1)
- Llengua de les Balears 1 (ISBN 84-273-0002-6)
- Llengua de les Balears 2 (ISBN 84-273-0004-2)
