= Old Catalan =

Medieval form of the Catalan Language

- Medieval Catalan
- catalanesc, catalanesch, romanç
- Pronunciation: [katalaˈnesk], [kətələˈnəsk], [roˈmãnt͡s]
- Region: Principality of Catalonia, Kingdom of Valencia, Balearic Islands, Sardinia
- Era: 9th–16th century, evolved into Modern Catalan by the 16th century
- Language family: Indo-European: Italic; Latino-Faliscan; Romance; Italo-Western; Western; Gallo-Romance; Occitano-Romance; Old Catalan
- Early forms: Old Latin: Vulgar Latin; Proto-Romance; Old Occitan
- Writing system: Latin

Language codes
- ISO 639-3: –
- Glottolog: oldc1251
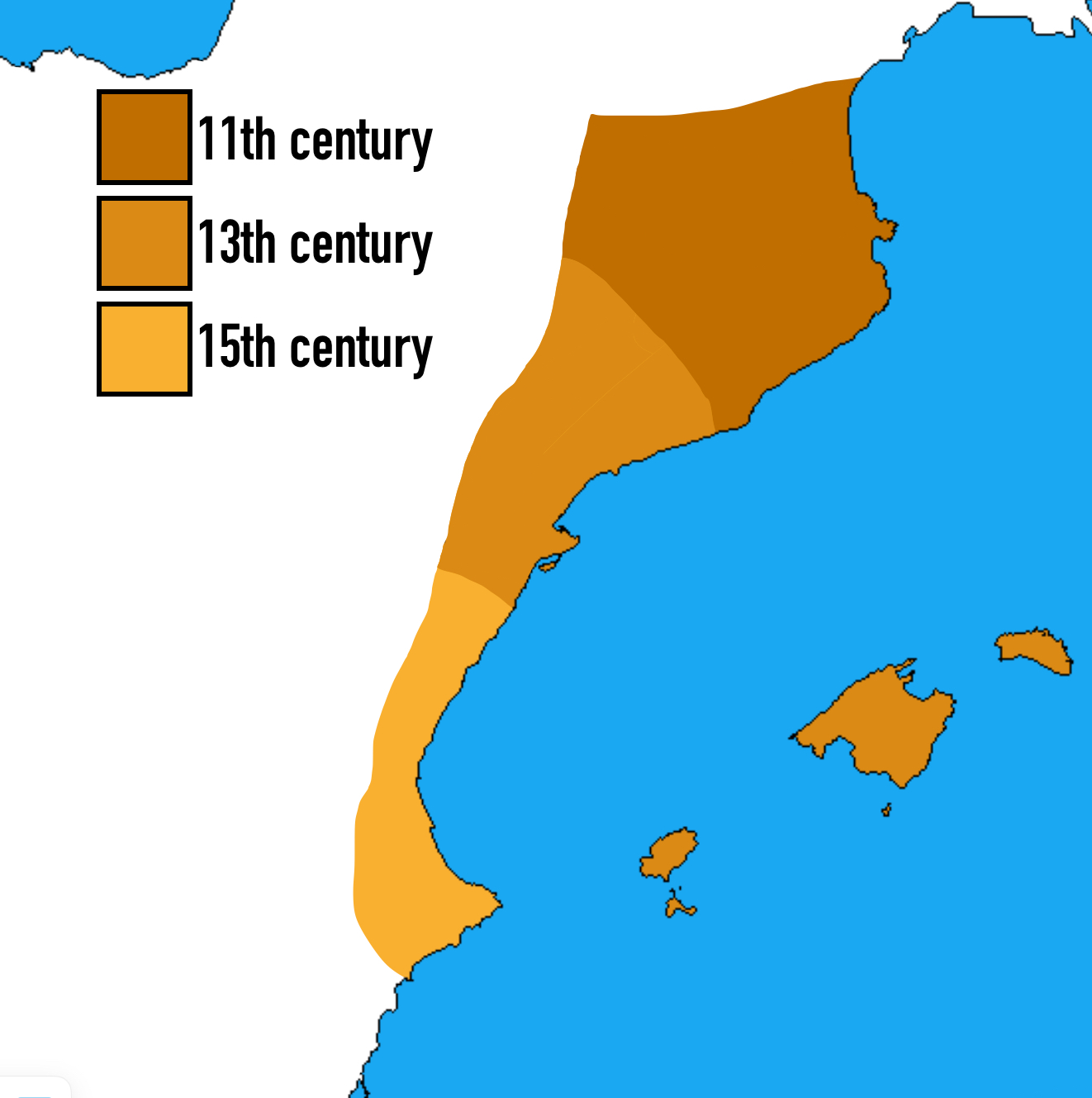
- Probable linguistic expansion of Old Catalan from the 11th to 15th centuries

Old Catalan, also known as Medieval Catalan, is the modern denomination for Romance varieties that during the Middle Ages were spoken in territories that spanned roughly the territories of the Principality of Catalonia, the Kingdom of Valencia, the Balearic Islands, and the island of Sardinia; all of them then part of the Crown of Aragon. These varieties were part of a dialect continuum with what today is called Old Occitan that reached the Loire Valley in the north and Northern Italy in the east. Consequently, Old Catalan can be considered a dialect group of Old Occitan, or be classified as an Occitano-Romance variety side by side with Old Occitan (also known as Old Provençal).

The modern separation of Catalan and Occitan should not be confused with a clear separation between the languages in the mindset of their speakers historically. From the 8th century to the 13th century, there was no clear sociolinguistic distinction between Occitania and Catalonia. For instance, the Provençal troubadour, Albertet de Sestaró, says: "Monks, tell me which according to your knowledge are better: the French or the Catalans? And here I shall put Gascony, Provence, Limousin, Auvergne and Viennois while there shall be the land of the two kings." (Monges, causetz, segons vostre siensa qual valon mais, catalan ho francés?/ E met de sai Guascuenha e Proensa/ E lemozí, alvernh’ e vianés/ E de lai met la terra dels dos reis.) In Marseille, a typical Provençal song is called "Catalan song". Moreover, the dialects of Modern Catalan were still considered to be part of the same language as the dialects of Occitan in the 19th century, when Catalans still could call their language Llengua llemosina, using the name of the Limousin dialect as a metonymy for Occitan.

== Phonology ==
=== Consonants ===
Consonants of Old Catalan
		Labial	Dental/ Alveolar	Palatal	Velar	
		Labial	Dental/ Alveolar	Palatal	plain	labialised
Nasal		m	n	ɲ	(ŋ)	
Stop	voiceless	p	t		k	kʷ
Stop	voiced	b	d		ɡ	ɡʷ
Affricate	voiceless		ts	tʃ		
Affricate	voiced		dz	dʒ		
Fricative	voiceless	f	s	ʃ		
Fricative	voiced	v	z	(ʒ)		
Approximant	central			j		w
Approximant	lateral		l	ʎ		
Rhotic			r ~ ɾ			

==== Laterals ====
It is believed that Old Catalan featured a sequence /jl/ that contrasted with /ʎ/ in non-initial positions. The former came from the Latin groups C'L, G'L, LE, and LI and was written as ⟨yl⟩ and ⟨il⟩, whereas the latter was written ⟨ll⟩. The palatal lateral has remained unchanged in modern Catalan, but the /jl/ sequence has coalesced into /ʎ/ in most dialects (including all the Western bloc and most of Central Catalan) removing the distinction. In a minority of dialects (such as Insular Catalan, where it remains unchallenged and some towns in the provinces of Girona and Barcelona such as Vic and its surrounds and towns in Selva, where it has more or less remained the traditional pronunciation), the /l/ was dropped, yielding a merger with /j/ instead.

Around the 12th century, word-initial /l/ became /ʎ/, but it continued to be spelled as ⟨l⟩ until the 15th century, when it was replaced by the modern ⟨ll⟩ spelling.

Latin words with ⟨ll⟩ would also come to be pronounced /ʎ/ just like in Spanish, but and unlike Spanish /ʎ/ could also appear word-finally.

==== Labiodentals ====
/v/ began to merge into /b/ in some dialects around the 14th century, a process called betacism. Now, the distinction is maintained only in Valencia, the Balearic Islands, and towns in southern Tarragona.

==== Affricates ====
Like other Western Romance languages, soft ⟨c⟩ (i.e. before either ⟨e⟩ or ⟨i⟩) and ⟨ç⟩ was pronounced /ts/, and it would only later merge into /s/. Likewise ⟨z⟩ was pronounced /dz/, and it would only later merge into /z/ (due to final-obstruent devoicing final ⟨z⟩ was also pronounced /ts/, as ⟨ç⟩). Instances of intervocalic /dz/ would be kept although with the rather different ⟨tz⟩ spelling: compare Catalan/Occitan dotze 'twelve', tretze 'thirteen', setze 'sixteen' with Old French doze, treze, seze. Later instances of intervocalic /z/ from Greek and Arabic would also give the rise of a second /dz/, which would keep the ⟨tz⟩ spelling.

Also due to final-obstruent devoicing, word-final instances of /dʒ/ would devoice to /tʃ/ (such as final -⟨ig⟩: puig 'hill', mig 'half'). Other instances of /tʃ/ (mostly borrowed non-native), came to be spelled with the rather different ⟨tx⟩ spelling: fletxa 'arrow' (< Old French fleche, now flèche), botxí 'executioner' ( < Old French bouchier 'butcher'), caputxa 'hood' (< Italian cappuccio), butxaca 'pocket' ( < obscure) and remain with such spelling to this day.

==== Fricatives ====
The affricate /dʒ/ originating from soft ⟨g⟩ and nonvocalic ⟨i⟩ would later deaffricate to /ʒ/.

The phoneme /ʃ/, which would initially only appear in intervocalic and word-final positions, would almost unanimously originate from instances of /ks/ (Latin ⟨x⟩), */sts/ (Latin ⟨sc⟩), */ksts/ (Latin ⟨xc⟩), */ks/ from /ps/ (Latin ⟨ps⟩) and more rarely from palatalized /ss/. Due to the abundance of the first group of words, the spelling ⟨x⟩ would be adopted for /ʃ/, including in intervocalic instances (like in Portuguese but unlike Modern Catalan which spells such instances with ⟨ix⟩). Later /ʃ/ would also appear at word-initial position from palatalized /s/.

Non-geminated intervocalic /s/ was voiced and gave the original /z/ sound (later ⟨z⟩ would also merge with the latter sound). Geminated intervocalic instances of ⟨s⟩, as in ⟨ss⟩, would result in /s/, a spelling still retained to this day.

=== Vowels ===
Vowels of Old Catalan
	Front	Central	Back
Close	i		u
Close-mid	e	ə	o
Open-mid	ɛ	ə	ɔ
Open	a		

The system features a modification of the original Proto-Romance /e/ and /ɛ/. First, /e/ was centralized to /ə/ in Eastern Catalan (but remained /e/ in the Western variety) and then, /ɛ/ was raised to /e/.

In Modern Central Catalan (and in the eastern half of the island of Menorca and most towns of Ibiza including Ibiza City), stressed /ə/ has been fronted to /ɛ/, thus partially inverting the original Proto-Romance distribution still found in Italian and Portuguese. Balearic varieties (such as Majorcan, Minorcan in the western half of the island of Menorca and Ibizan in Sant Antoni de Portmany) still keep stressed /ə/.

It is assumed that during the preliterary period, all Catalan dialects featured a weak realization of the pretonic vowels. Around the 13th century, pretonic /a/ and /e/ began to be confused in writing in the Eastern dialects, and the confusion later spread to all unstressed instances of /a/ and /e/, a process that was almost complete by the 15th century.

Final post-tonic /e, o/ were lost during the formation of Catalan. According to some historic studies, final nasals were velarised and assimilated before being lost in Modern Catalan: pan [ˈpãŋ] → [ˈpã] → [ˈpa] (pa 'bread').

== Orthography ==
Current Catalan orthography is mostly based on mediaeval practice, but some of the pronunciations and conventions have changed.

- Accents (such as ⟨´⟩ and ⟨`⟩) and the diaeresis ⟨¨⟩ were used less frequently.
- The tilde ⟨~⟩ was sometimes used above a vowel to replace a following ⟨m⟩ or ⟨n⟩.
- The interpunct ⟨·⟩ was often used to indicate elision and hyphenation.
- ⟨c⟩ in front of ⟨e⟩, ⟨i⟩; ⟨ç⟩ and final ⟨z⟩ (also spelled ⟨ç⟩, and ⟨s⟩ after merging with /s/) represented /ts/ instead of modern /s/: Old Catalan /ˈtsɛl/, modern cel /ˈsɛl/
- ⟨ch⟩, ⟨ph⟩, ⟨rh⟩ and ⟨th⟩ represented /k/, /f/, /r/ and /t/. Mediaeval scribes often confused them with ⟨c⟩, ⟨f⟩, ⟨r⟩ and ⟨t⟩
- ⟨ch⟩ represented /tʃ/, especially in the Valencian variant
- ⟨ch⟩ at the end of the word was used for /k/ , instead of modern ⟨c⟩, until the early 20th century; for example, modern amic was written amich ("friend").
- ⟨yl⟩, ⟨il⟩, were used for the sequence /jl/. In the modern language, it has come to be pronounced /ʎ/ or /j/ depending on the dialect. Both are now written as ⟨ll⟩: modern mirall was written mirail or mirayl ("mirror"), cf. Latin miraculus.
- Initial /ʎ/, which appeared in the 12th century from initial /l/, was written as ⟨l⟩ until the 15th century to maintain connections with Latin etyma. In the modern language, it is written as ⟨ll⟩: e.g. modern llibre was written libre ("book"). Cf. Latin liber.
- ⟨h⟩ was frequently omitted: modern haver was written aver ("to have"), cf. Latin habere.
- ⟨h⟩ was sometimes used to mark hiatus: modern veí was written vehi ("neighbour")
- Final unvoiced obstruents were often written as such. In the modern language, the characters for their voiced counterparts may be used to reflect Latin etymology: modern fred was written fret ("cold"), cf. Latin frigidus.

== History ==
=== Early Middle Ages ===
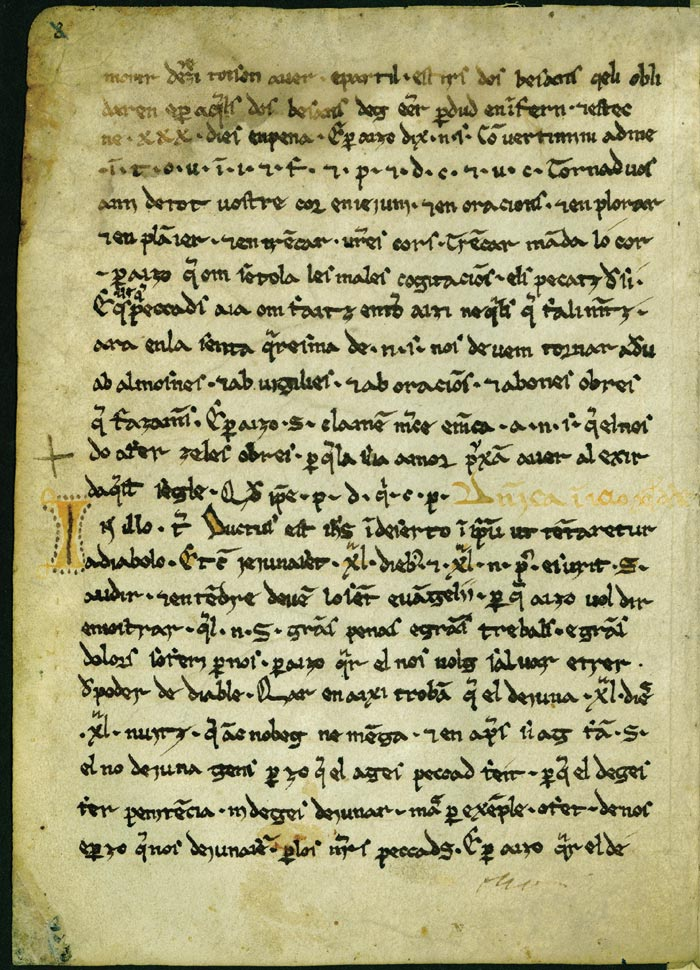
Les Homilies d'Organyà (12th century), first written in Catalan.

By the 9th century, the Catalan language had developed from Vulgar Latin on both sides of the eastern end of the Pyrenees mountains (counties of Rosselló, Empúries, Besalú, Cerdanya, Urgell, Pallars and Ribagorça), as well as in the territories of the Roman province and later archdiocese of Tarraconensis to the south. From the 8th century on, the Catalan counts extended their territory southwards and westwards, conquering territories then occupied by Muslims, bringing their language with them.

This phenomenon gained momentum with the separation of the County of Barcelona from the Carolingian Empire in 988 AD. By the 9th century, the Christian rulers occupied the northern parts of present-day Catalonia, usually termed "Old Catalonia", and during the 11th and 12th centuries they expanded their domains to the region north of the Ebro river, a land known as "New Catalonia". During the 13th century, the Catalans expanded to the Land of Valencia and across to the Balearic Islands and Alghero in Sardinia.

Greuges of Guitard Isarn, Lord of Caboet (c. 1080–1095)

Hec est memoria de ipsas rancuras que abet dominus Guitardus Isarnus, senior Caputense, de rancuras filio Guillelm Arnall et que ag de suo pater, Guilelm Arnall; et non voluit facere directum in sua vita de ipso castro Caputense che li comannà. Et si Guilelm Arnal me facia tal cosa que dreçar no·m volgués ho no poqués, ho ssi·s partia de mi, che Mir Arnall me romasés aisí com lo·m avia al dia che ad él lo commanné. Et in ipsa onor a Guillelm Arnal no li doné negú domenge ni establiment de cavaler ni de pedó per gitar ni per metre quan l·i comanné Mir Arnall.

— Lines 1–4. Passages in Catalan Romance in italics

According to historian Jaume Villanueva (1756–1824), the first attested Catalan sentence is thought to be found in an 8th-century manuscript from Ripoll that has since been lost. It was a whimsical note in 10th- or early 11th-century calligraphy: Magister m[eu]s no vol que em miras novel ("my master does not want you to watch me, newbie").

During the 11th century, several feudal documents (especially oaths and complaints) written in macaronic Latin began to exhibit elements of Catalan, with proper names or even sentences in Romance. Of special historical and linguistic importance is the Memorial of Complaints of Ponç I (c. 1050–1060), featuring whole sentences in Romance. By the end of the 11th century, documents written completely or mostly in Catalan began to appear, like the Complaints of Guitard Isarn, Lord of Caboet (c. 1080–1095), or The Oath of peace and truce of count Pere Ramon (1098). Catalan shares many features with Gallo-Romance languages, which are mostly located in France and Northern Italy. Old Catalan diverged from Old Occitan between the 11th and 14th centuries.

=== Late Middle Ages ===

Catalan lived a golden age during the Late Middle Ages, reaching a peak of maturity and cultural plenitude. Examples of this can be seen in the works of Majorcan polymath Ramon Llull (1232–1315), the Four Great Chronicles (13th–14th centuries), and the Valencian school of poetry which culminated in Ausiàs March (1397–1459).

By the 15th century, the city of Valencia had become the center of social and cultural dynamism, and Catalan was present all over the Mediterranean world. The belief that political splendor was correlated with linguistic consolidation was voiced through the Royal Chancery, which promoted a highly standardized language.

The outstanding novel of chivalry Tirant lo Blanc (1490), by Joanot Martorell, shows the transition from medieval to Renaissance values, something than can also be seen in the works of Bernat Metge and Andreu Febrer. During this period, Catalan was what Costa Carreras terms "one of the 'great languages' of medieval Europe". The flowering of the Renaissance was closely associated with the advent of the printing press, and the first book produced with movable type in the Iberian Peninsula was printed in Valencia in 1474: Trobes en llaors de la Verge maria ("Poems of praise of the Virgin Mary").

== See also ==
- History of Catalan
- Limousin language
- Old Provençal

== Bibliography ==
- Costa Carreras, Joan; Yates, Alan (2009). The Architect of Modern Catalan: Selected Writings/Pompeu Fabra (1868–1948). Instutut d'Estudis Catalans & Universitat Pompeu Fabra & Jonh Benjamins B.V. pp. 6–7. ISBN 978-90-272-3264-9.
- Duarte i Montserrat, Carles; Alsina i Keith, Àlex (1984), Gramàtica històrica del català, Curial, ISBN 8472562344
- Moll, Francesc de B. (1993). Diccionari català-valencià-balear: inventari lexicogràfic i etimològic de la llengua catalana en totes les seves formes literàries i dialectals (10 volumes). Antoni Maria Alcover i Sureda, Manuel Sanchis Guarner and Anna Moll Marquès. Palma: Moll.
- Moran, Josep (1994). Treballs de lingüística històrica catalana (in Catalan). Barcelona: Publicacions de l'Abadia de Monsterrat. pp. 55–93. ISBN 84-7826-568-6.
- Moran, Josep (2004). Estudis d'història de la llengua catalana (in Catalan). Barcelona: Publicacions de l'Abadia de Montserrat. pp. 37–38. ISBN 84-8415-672-9.
- Recasens, Daniel (1996) [1991]. Fonètica descriptiva del català: assaig de caracterització de la pronúncia del vocalisme i el consonantisme català al segle XX (2nd ed.). Barcelona: Institut d'Estudis Catalans. ISBN 9788472833128.
- Riquer, Martí de (1964). Història de la Literatura Catalana (in Catalan). Vol. 1. Barcelona: Ariel.
- Veny, Joan (1997). "greuges de Guitard isarn, Senyor de Caboet (1080–1095)". Homenatge a Arthur Terry. Barcelona: Publicacions de l'Abadia de Montserrat. pp. 9–18. ISBN 84-7826-894-4.
