= Balearic Catalan =

Dialects of Catalan in the Balearic islands

Balearic
- balear
- Native to: Spain
- Region: Balearic Islands
- Speakers of any Catalan dialect in the islands: (746,792 cited 2001)
- Language family: Indo-European: Italic; Romance; Western Romance; Gallo-Romance; Occitano-Romance; Catalan; Eastern; Insular; Balearic
- Early forms: Proto-Indo-European: Proto-Italic; Old Latin; Vulgar Latin; Proto-Romance; Old Occitan; Old Catalan
- Dialects: Mallorcan; Menorcan; Ibizan
- Writing system: Catalan alphabet

Language codes
- ISO 639-3: –
- Glottolog: bale1256
- IETF: ca-u-sd-esib
- The Catalan-speaking territories with the Balearic Islands in red (■)

Balearic (Catalan: balear) (Note: Pronunciation: [bəleˈa]) is the group of dialects of Catalan spoken in the Balearic Islands: mallorquí in Mallorca, eivissenc in Ibiza and menorquí in Menorca.

At the 2011 census, 861,232 respondents in the Balearic Islands claimed to be able to understand either Balearic or mainland Catalan, compared to 111,912 respondents who could not; proportions were similar on each of the islands.

== Dialects ==
The dialects spoken in the Balearic Islands are mallorquí, spoken on Mallorca; menorquí, on Menorca; and eivissenc, on Ibiza and Formentera.

== Features ==
Distinctive features of Catalan in the Balearic Islands differ according to the specific variant being spoken (Mallorcan, Menorcan, or Ibizan).

=== Phonology ===
Vowels

Vowels of Balearic Catalan
	Front	Central	Back
Close	i		u
Close	e	ə	o
Open	ɛ	ə	ɔ
Open	a		

Notes:
- Most variants preserve a vocalic system of eight stressed vowels; /a/, /ə/, /ɛ/, /e/, /i/, /ɔ/, /o/, /u/:
  - The Mallorcan system has eight stressed vowels /a, ə, ɛ, e, i, ɔ, o, u/, reduced to four /ə, i, o, u/ in unstressed position.
    - In the Mallorcan town of Sóller, vowels tend to reduce to three /ə, i, u/, as most Eastern Catalan dialects.
  - The Western Menorcan system has eight stressed vowels /a, ə, ɛ, e, i, ɔ, o, u/, reduced to three /ə, i, u/ in unstressed position.
  - The Eastern Menorcan and partly the Ibizan system have seven stressed vowels /a, ɛ, e, i, ɔ, o, u/ reduced to three /ə, i, u/ in unstressed position (as in Central Catalan). There are differences between the dialect spoken in Ibiza Town (eivissenc de vila) and those of the rest of the island (eivissenc pagès) and Formentera (formenterer).
  - The vowel /a/ is central [ä] in Ibizan (as most Catalan dialects), while it is front [a] in Mallorcan and Menorcan. The higher variant [æ] is found in some towns, like Felanitx.
    - Stressed /a/ can be further retracted to [ɑ] in contact with velar consonants (including the velarized [ɫ]), and fronted to [a] in contact with palatals.
  - The so-called "open vowels" (vocals obertes), /ɛ/ and /ɔ/, are generally as low as /a/ in most Balearic subvarieties. The phonetic realizations of /ɛ/ approaches [æ] (as in American English lad) and /ɔ/ is nearly as open as [ɒ] (as in traditional RP dog) (feature shared with Valencian). In some Mallorcan dialects /ɔ/ can be unrounded to [ɑ].
  - Unstressed /i, u/ can be lower and centralized: [ɪ, ʊ].
  - Unstressed [ə]:
    - In most of parts of Mallorca, words with ante-penultimate stress ending in -ia lose the ⟨a⟩ [ə]; e.g. glòria ('glory') is pronounced as glòri [ˈɡɫɔ̞ɾɪ].

Consonants

Consonants of Balearic Catalan
		Labial	Dental/ Alveolar	Palatal	Velar
Nasal		m	n	ɲ	(ŋ)
Plosive	voiceless	p	t	c ~ k	
Plosive	voiced	b	d	ɟ ~ ɡ	
Affricate	voiceless		t͡s	t͡ʃ	
Affricate	voiced		d͡z	d͡ʒ	
Fricative	voiceless	f	s	ʃ	
Fricative	voiced	v	z	ʒ	
Rhotics	trill		r		
Rhotics	tap		ɾ		
Approximant	median			j	w
Approximant	lateral		l	ʎ	

Notes:
- In Mallorcan and some Menorcan subvarieties /k/ and /ɡ/ become palatal, [c] and [ɟ], before non-back vowels and word-finally; e.g. guerra [ˈɟɛ̞rə] ('war'), casa [ˈcazə] ('house').
- [ɟ] is in free variation with [ʝ].
- A phonemic distinction between /v/ and /b/ is preserved, as in Algherese and Standard Valencian, e.g. viu [ˈviw].
- As Central Catalan /l/ is velarised, [ɫ], in all instances; e.g. tela [ˈtəɫə] / [ˈtɛ̞ɫə] ('cloth', 'fabric'). However the velarised /l/ (also known as dark l) is not used in broader transcriptions (like Help:IPA/Catalan) of any Catalan variety.
- The palatal lateral approximant /ʎ/ is preserved as a distinct phoneme, with absence of ieisme except for the most Castilianised speakers. However, most Mallorcan speakers use [j] rather than /ʎ/ in words that in Latin had /l/ + yod (-li-, -le-), -cvl-, or -tvl-; e.g. palla [ˈpajə] 'straw', from Latin palea. This is known as iodització. Note that this phenomenon is more restricted than ieisme, as /ʎ/ is always used initially e.g. lluna [ˈʎunə] ('moon'), as well as intervocalically in words that had -ll- in Latin.
- Depalatalization of syllable-final /ɲs/ and /ŋks/ with compensatory diphthongization in Mallorcan: anys [ˈajns] ('years'), troncs [ˈtɾojns] ('logs').
- Most Balearic variants preserve final stops in clusters; e.g. [mp], [nt], [ŋk], and [lt]: camp [ˈkamp] 'field' (feature shared with Modern Valencian).
- Balearic variants of Catalan have the strongest tendency not to pronounce historical final ⟨r⟩ in any context; e.g. amor [əˈmo] 'love', cor [ˈkɔ̞] 'heart'.
- Assimilation of intervocalic clusters in some Mallorcan and Menorcan subvarieties:

Cluster assimilations
IPA	word	gloss
/kt/ → [tː]	acte	'act'
/ks/ → [t͡s]	acció excés	'action' 'excess'
/ɡz/ → [d͡z]	examen	'exam'
/pd/ → [dː] /bd/ → [dː] /kd/ → [dː] /ɡd/ → [dː]	propdit abduir anècdota maragda	'before said' 'abduct' 'anecdote' 'emerald'
/bm/ → [mː] /pm/ → [mː] /dm/ → [mː] /tm/ → [mː]	submarí capmoix admet setmana	'submarine' 'crestfallen' 'admitted' 'week'
/bn/ → [nː] /pn/ → [nː] /dn/ → [nː] /tn/ → [nː]	obnoxi apnea adnat cotna	'obnoxious' 'apnea' 'adnate' 'rind'

(Notice some of these assimilations may also occur in continental Catalan: capmoix /ˌkapˈmoʃ/ → [ˌkabˈmoʃ] ~ [ˌkamˈmoʃ] 'crestfallen').

Other assimilations (amongst many) include:

- /fɡ/ → [ɡː] (e.g. afgans 'afghani')
- /ɾl/ → [ɫː] (e.g. Carles 'Carl')

Prosody

- Except in Ibiza, in combinations of verb and weak pronoun (clitics), the accent moves to the final element; e.g. comprar-ne [komˌpɾaˈnə] or [kʊmˌpɾaˈnə] (Standard Central Catalan [kumˈpɾaɾ.nə]).

=== Morphology and syntax ===
- Balearic preserves the salat definite article (derived from Latin ipse/ipsa instead of ille/illa), a feature shared only with Sardinian, some dialects of Abruzzese and Sicilan among extant Romance languages, but which was more common in other Catalan and Gascon areas in ancient times. However, the salat definite article is also preserved along the Costa Brava (Catalonia) and in the Valencian municipalities of Tàrbena and La Vall de Gallinera.
- The personal article en/na, n' is used before personal names.
- The first person singular present indicative has a zero exponent, i.e. no visible ending. For example, what in Central Catalan would be jo parlo ('I speak') is realised as jo parl.
- In verbs of the first conjugation (in -ar), the first and second person plural forms end in -am and -au respectively. For example, cantam ('we sing'), cantau ('you pl. sing').
- Also in verbs of the first conjugation, the imperfect subjunctive is formed with -a-, e.g. cantàs, cantassis. However, the Standard Catalan forms in ⟨e⟩ are nowadays also common in many places.
- In combinations of two unstressed pronouns preceding a verb, one direct with the form el, la, etc. and the other indirect with the form me, te, etc., the direct pronoun appears first. For example, la me dóna ('s/he gives it to me'), Standard Catalan me la dóna.

=== Lexicon ===
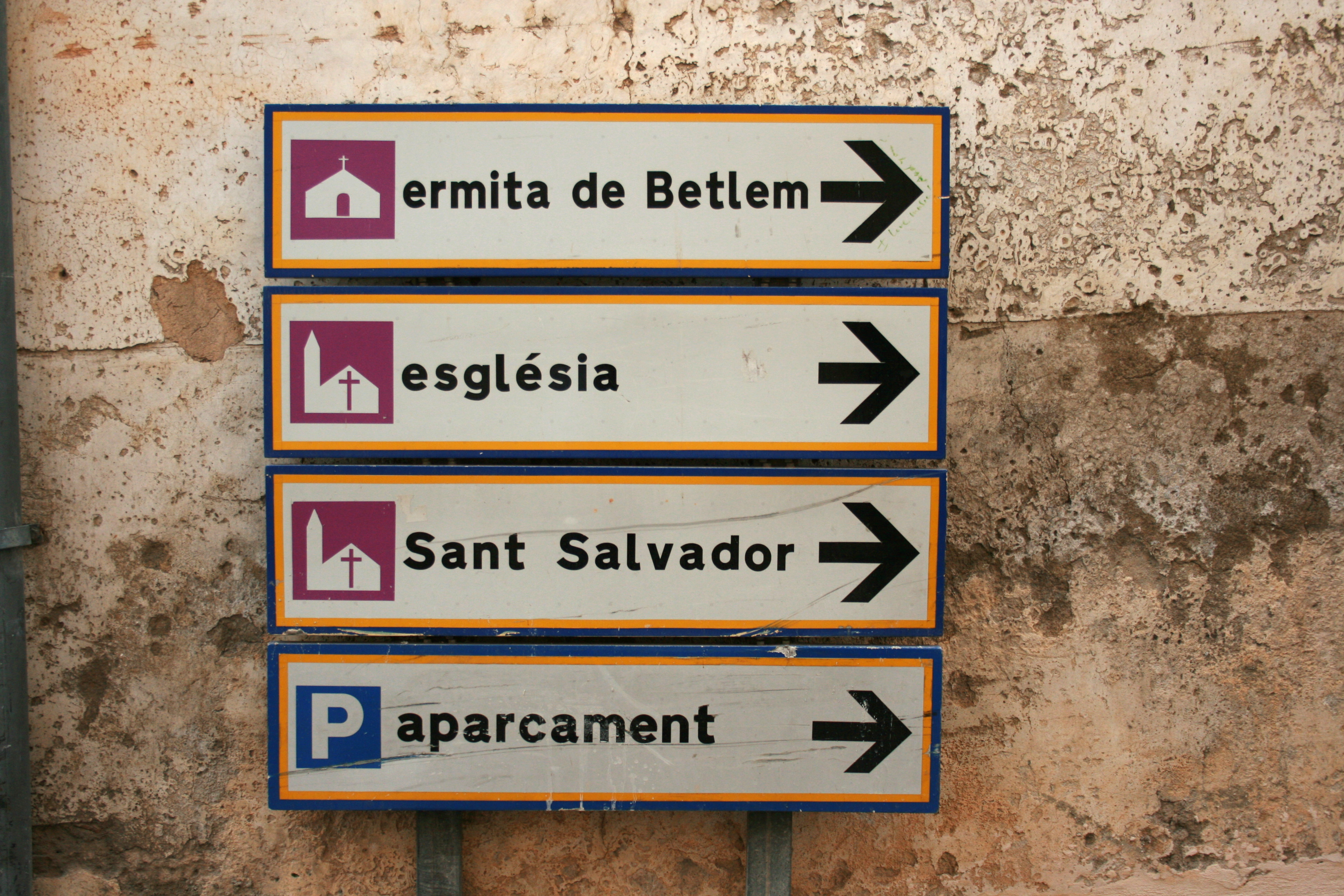
Catalan language sign in Artà.

- Balearic has a large quantity of characteristic vocabulary, especially archaisms preserved by the isolation of the islands and the variety of linguistic influences which surround them. The lexicon differs considerably depending on the subdialect. For example: al·lot for standard "noi" ('boy'), moix for "gat" ('cat'), besada for "petó" ('kiss'), ca for "gos" ('dog'), doblers for "diners" ('money'), horabaixa for "vesprada" ('evening') and rata-pinyada for "rat-penat" ('bat').
- Menorcan has a few English loanwords dating back to the British occupation, such as grevi ('gravy'), xumaquer ('shoemaker'), boínder ('bow window'), xoc ('chalk') or ull blec ('black eye').

== Political questions ==
Some in the Balearic Islands, such as the Partido Popular party member and former Balearic president José Ramón Bauzà, argue that the dialects of Balearic Islands are actually separate languages and not dialects of Catalan. During the election of 2011, Bauzà campaigned against having centralized or standardized standards of Catalan in public education.

== See also ==
- Catalan language
- Catalan dialects and varieties
  - Alguerese
  - Central Catalan
  - Northern Catalan
  - Valencian

== Bibliography ==
- Carbonell, Joan F.; Llisterri, Joaquim (1992), "Catalan" (PDF), Journal of the International Phonetic Association, 22 (1–2): 53–56, doi:10.1017/S0025100300004618, S2CID 249411809
- Recasens Vives, Daniel (1996) [1991], Fonètica descriptiva del català: assaig de caracterització de la pronúncia del vocalisme i el consonantisme català al segle XX, Biblioteca Filològica (in Catalan), vol. 21 (2nd ed.), Barcelona. Spain: Institut d'Estudis Catalans, ISBN 978-84-7283-312-8
- Wheeler, Max W (2005), The Phonology Of Catalan, Oxford: Oxford University Press, ISBN 978-0-19-925814-7
