= Catalan phonology =

Sounds and pronunciation of Catalan

The Catalan phonology has a certain degree of dialectal variation. Although there are two standard varieties, one based on Central Eastern dialect and another one based on South-Western or Valencian, this article deals with features of all or most dialects, as well as regional pronunciation differences.

Catalan is characterized by final-obstruent devoicing, lenition and (in some dialects) fortition of plosives, voicing assimilation, and gemination (consonant lengthening); a set of 7 to 8 phonemic vowels (plus 2 rare rounded vowels, found mainly in French loanwords or Northern Catalan or both), vowel assimilations (including vowel harmony), many phonetic diphthongs, and vowel reduction, whose precise details differ between dialects.

== Consonants ==
Consonants of Catalan
		Labial	Dental/Alveolar	Palatal	Velar
Nasal		m^{2}	n^{6}	ɲ^{9}	ŋ*
Approximant	lateral		l^{6}	ʎ^{9}	
Approximant	median (central)			j	w^{11}
Approximant	median (central)	b^{1}^{,}^{2}	d^{1}^{,}^{3}	ɡ^{1}^{,}^{4}	
Plosive (Stop)	voiced	b^{1}^{,}^{2}	d^{1}^{,}^{3}	ɡ^{1}^{,}^{4}	
Plosive (Stop)	voiceless	p^{2}	t^{3}	k^{4}	
Affricate	voiced		d͡z^{8}	d͡ʒ^{10}	
Affricate	voiceless		(t͡s)^{8}	t͡ʃ ^{10}	
Fricative	voiced	v*^{5}	z^{7}	ʒ^{10}	
Fricative	voiceless	f^{5}	s^{7}	ʃ^{10}	
Tap			ɾ^{6}		
Trill			r^{7}		

Consonants in parentheses () are rare and consonants with an asterisk * are phonemic dialectally.

Marginal consonants include /θ/, /x/ and /h/.

Phonetic notes:

- ^1 /b/, /d/, /ɡ/ are pronounced as voiced stops only after a pause, after a nasal consonant, or—in the case of /d/—after a lateral consonant, and—/b/—after a labiodental; in all other contexts, they are realized as approximants (namely [β̞, ð̞, ɣ̞], hereafter represented without the downtacks). (See "plosives" below).
  - In non-betacist (i.e., /b/ and /v/ contrasting) dialects, /b/ tends to fail to lenite into [β].
  - In Standard Catalan /b/, /ɡ/ fortify (i.e., fail to lenite) before /l/ in intervocalic position.
- ^2 /b/, /p/, /m/ are bilabial. /m/ before /f, v/ is labiodental ([ɱ]).
- ^3 /t/, /d/ are laminal denti-alveolar [t̪], [d̪]. After /s, z/, they are laminal alveolar [t̻], [d̻].
- ^4 /k/, /ɡ/ are velar but fronted to pre-velar position ([k̟], [ɡ̟]) before front vowels. In some Mallorcan dialects, the situation is reversed; the main realization is palatal [c], [ɟ]; but before liquids and rounded back vowels they are velar [k], [ɡ].
- ^5 /f/, /v/ are labiodental.
- ^6 /n/, /l/, /ɾ/ are apical front alveolar [n̺], [l̺], [ɾ̺], but the first two are laminal denti-alveolar [n̪], [l̪] before /t/, /d/. /l/ is postalveolar [l̠] or alveolo-palatal [ʎ̟] before /ʃ/, /ʒ/, /t͡ʃ/, /d͡ʒ/. In addition, /n/ is postalveolar [n̠] or alveolo-palatal [ɲ̟] before /ʃ/, /ʒ/, /t͡ʃ/, /d͡ʒ/, velar [ŋ] before /k/, /ɡ/ and labiodental [ɱ] before /f/, (/v/), where it merges with /m/. It also merges with /m/ (to [m]) before /p/, /b/.
- ^7 /s/, /z/, /r/ are apical back alveolar [s̺], [z̺], [r̺], also described as postalveolar (i.e., [s̠], [z̠], [r̠]). /r/ (and even, /ɾ/) is realized as uvular [ʁ] in dialects like Northern Catalan, due to French influence.
- ^8 /t͡s/, /d͡z/ are apical alveolar. They may be somewhat fronted, so that the stop component is laminal denti-alveolar, while the fricative component is apical post-dental [t̻͡s̺], [d̻͡z̺] (according to Hualde (1992), /t͡s/ and /d͡z/ can be retracted: [t̪͡s̠], [d̪͡z̠]). /t͡s/ is rare and may not be phonemic (see below).
- ^9 /ʎ/, /ɲ/ are laminal "front alveolo-palatal" [ʎ̟], [ɲ̟].
- ^10 There is some confusion in the literature about the precise phonetic characteristics of /ʃ/, /ʒ/, /t͡ʃ/, and /d͡ʒ/; while Recasens Vives, Fontdevila & Pallarès Ramon (1995) and Recasens Vives & Espinosa (2007) describe them as "back alveolo-palatal", implying that the characters ⟨ɕ ʑ t͡ɕ d͡ʑ⟩ would be more accurate, they (and all literature on Catalan) use the characters for palato-alveolar affricates and fricatives while using ⟨ɕ ʑ⟩ for alveolo-palatal sounds in examples in other languages like Polish or Chinese. Otherwise, sources, like Carbonell Costa & Llisterri Boix (1992) generally describe them as "postalveolar".
- ^11 [w] is pronounced with bilabial and dorso-velar approximation simultaneously, and vibration of the vocal cords (voicing).

=== Obstruents ===
Voiced obstruents undergo final-obstruent devoicing.

Table with minimal pairs:

Coda obstruents minimal pairs
IPA	word	gloss	word	gloss
[p]	cub	'cube'	cup	'winepress'
[t]	tord	'thrush'	tort	'crooked'
[k]	mag	'magician'	mac	'pebble'
[f]	salv	'exempt'		
[s]	brunz	'he/she buzzes'	bruns	'dark browns'
[ʃ]			guix	'gypsum', 'chalk'
[t͡ʃ]	raig	'ray'		

Obstruents assimilate to the voicing of the following consonant and vowel:

- els [əɫs] (C) / [eɫs] (V) 'the' vs. els amics [əɫz‿əˈmiks] (C) / [eɫz‿ɐˈmiks] (V) 'the friends'.
- peix [ˈpe(j)ʃ] (C / V) 'fish' vs. peix gran [ˈpe(j)ʒ‿ˈɣɾän] (C / V) 'big fish'.
- faig [ˈfat͡ʃ] (C / V) 'I do' vs. faig allò [ˈfad͡ʒ‿əˈʎɔ] (C) / [ˈfad͡ʒ‿ɐˈʎɔ̞] (V) 'I do that'.

==== Plosives ====
Voiced plosives (also called stops) become lenited to approximants in syllable onsets, after continuants: /b/ → [β], /d/ → [ð], /ɡ/ → [ɣ].

- Exceptions include /d/ after lateral consonants (e.g. ull de bou [ˈuʎ də ˈβɔw] (C) / [ˈuʎ de ˈβɔw] (NW) 'oeil-de-boeuf') and /b/ after labiodentals (/f/, [v]), e.g. bolígraf boníssim [buˈɫiɣɾəv‿buˈnisim] (C) / [boˈɫiɣɾɐv‿boˈnisim] (NW) ('really good pen').
- In non-betacist dialects (those who do not merge /b/ with /v/), /b/ remains unlenited (e.g., ull de bou [ˈuʎ də ˈbɔ̞w] (M) / [ˈuʎ de ˈbɔ̞w] (V) 'oeil-de-boeuf').
- In some dialects, e.g., many Valencian accents, initial (that is, in all environments except after a nasal) /ɡ/ can be lenited: gat [ˈɣɑt] (V) ('cat').
- In the coda position, these sounds are always realized as stops; except in some Valencian dialects, where they might be lenited.

In Catalan and Balearic (not in Valencian), labial /b/ and /p/, and velar stops /ɡ/ and /k/ may be geminated (i.e., fortified) in intervocalic position before /l/ (e.g., poble [ˈpɔbːɫə] (C) / [ˈpɔbːɫe] (NW) 'village', 'people', regla [ˈreɡːɫə] (C) / [ˈreɡːɫɐ] (NW) 'rule'). Note in some accents (especially from Catalonia), further fortition is possible in the same environment: [ˈpɔpːɫə] (C) / [ˈpɔpːɫe] (NW) and [ˈrekːɫə] (C) / [ˈrekːɫɐ] (NW).

- In Valencian, the pronunciation of these stops would be with usual lenition (except with /b/ in non-betacist dialects): [ˈpɔ̞ble] (or [ˈpɔ̞βle]) (V) and [ˈreɣlɐ] (V).

Intervocalic /d/ is dropped (particularly in participles) in regular speech in Valencian, with compensatory lengthening of vowel /a/; e.g., vesprada [vesˈpɾäː] (V) ('afternoon').

In Mallorcan varieties, velar stops /k/ and /ɡ/ become [c] and [ɟ] word-finally and before front vowels, in some of these dialects, this has extended to all environments except before liquids and back vowels; e.g., sang [ˈsaɲc] (M) ('blood').

- The dorso-palatal [ʝ] may occur in complementary distribution with [ɟ], only in Mallorcan varieties that have dorso-palatals rather than the velars found in most dialects: guerra [ˈɟɛ̞rə] (M) ('war') vs. sa guerra [sə ˈʝɛ̞rə] (M) ('the war').

In the Valencian dialects final voiceless plosives (/p/, /t/, /k/) may be lenited before a vowel: tot açò [ˈtoð‿ɐˈsɔ̞] (V) ('all this').

==== Affricates ====
The phonemic status of affricates is dubious; after other consonants, affricates are in free variation with fricatives; e.g., clenxa [ˈkɫɛɲʃə] ~ [ˈkɫɛɲt͡ʃə] (C) / [ˈkɫeɲt͡ʃɐ] (V) ('hair parting') and may be analyzed as either single phonemes or clusters of a stop and a fricative.

- Alveolar affricates, [t͡s] and [d͡z], occur the least of all affricates.
  - [d͡z] only occurs intervocalically: metzina [məˈd͡zinə] (C) / [meˈd͡zinɐ] (V) ('toxic substance').
    - In Valencian, many instances of [d͡z] (especially the -itzar suffix) are deaffricated to [z]: utilitzar [ʊtɪlɪˈzäɾ] (V) ('to use').
  - Instances of [t͡s] arise mostly from compounding; the few lexical instances arise from historical compounding. For instance, potser ('maybe') comes from pot ('may') + ser ('be' [inf.]). As such, [t͡s] does not occur word-initially; other than some rare words of foreign origin (e.g., tsar 'tsar', tsuga 'tsuga'), but it may occur word-finally and quite often in cases of heteromorphemic (i.e., across a morpheme boundary) plural endings: tots [ˈtot͡s] ('all', 'everyone'). Several linguists claim [t͡s] is not a phoneme on its own, but a simple combination of [t] and [s], in the same way that the [ts] in English 'cats' is not phonemic.
- The distribution of alveolo-palatal affricates, [t͡ʃ] and [d͡ʒ], depends on dialect:
  - In most of Valencian and southern Catalonia, most occurrences of [d͡ʒ] correspond to the voiced fricative [ʒ] in Standard Eastern Catalan: gel [ˈd͡ʒɛ̞ɫ] (V) ('ice').
  - In Standard Eastern Catalan, word-initial [t͡ʃ] is found only in a few words of foreign origin (e.g., txec 'Czech', Txaikovski 'Tchaikovsky') while being found freely intervocalically (e.g., cotxe 'car') and word-finally: despatx [dəsˈpat͡ʃ] ('office').
  - Standard Eastern Catalan also only allows [d͡ʒ] in intervocalic position (e.g., metge 'medic'). Phonemic analyses show word-final occurrences of /d͡ʒ/ (e.g., raig esbiaixat [ˈrad͡ʒ‿əzβiə(j)ˈʃat] 'skew ray'), but final devoicing eliminates this from the surface: raig [ˈrat͡ʃ] ('ray').
  - In various other dialects (as well as in emphatic speech), including Valencian and its standard variety, [t͡ʃ] occurs word-initially and after another consonant to the exclusion of [ʃ] (although there are exceptions). These instances of word-initial [t͡ʃ] seem to correspond to [ʃ] in other dialects, including the standard (Eastern Catalan) on which the orthography is based: xinxa ('bedbug'), pronounced [ˈʃiɲʃə] in Standard Catalan, is [ˈt͡ʃiɲt͡ʃə] in these varieties ([ˈt͡ʃiɲt͡ʃɐ] in Valencian).

There is dialectal variation in regards to affricate length, with long affricates occurring in both Eastern and Western dialects such as in Mallorca and few areas in Southern Valencia. Also, intervocalic affricates (phonetically [t͡ɕ] and [d͡ʑ]) are, unlike Spanish, predominantly long, especially those that are voiced or occurring immediately after a stressed syllable (e.g., cotxe [ˈkot͡ːʃə] (C) / [ˈkot͡ːʃe] (NW) 'car', metge [ˈmed͡ːʒə] (C) / [ˈmed͡ːʒe] (NW) 'medic'). In Modern Valencian [d͡ʒ] and [d͡ːʒ] have merged into /d͡ʒ/, except in some parts of Southern Valencian. The pair [t͡ʃ] and [t͡ːʃ] have merged into /t͡ʃ/ in all Valencian dialects.

In Aragonese Catalan (especially Ribagorçan) and parts of Central Valencian (the so called apitxat accent), voiced affricates are missing (i.e., /d͡ʒ/ has merged with /t͡ʃ/: joc [ˈd͡ʒɔ̞k] in Standard Valencian → [ˈt͡ʃɔ̞k] (CV) 'game', and /d͡z/ has merged with /t͡s/: guitza [ˈɡid͡zɐ] in Standard Valencian → [ˈɡit͡sɐ] (CV) 'kick (of an animal)').

- Note that Central Valencian /t͡s/ is deaffricated to [s] in many cases (e.g., utilitzar [ʊtɪlɪˈzäɾ] in Standard Valencian → [ʊtɪlɪˈsäɾ] (CV) 'to use'), following the same rule as the rest of Valencian dialects.

==== Fricatives ====
The voiced labiodental fricative (/v/) occurs in Balearic, as well as in Algherese, Standard Valencian (in Valencian /v/ is found especially in southern and traditional northern varieties) and some areas in southern Catalonia (e.g., viu [ˈviw] 'he/she lives'). Everywhere else (including parts of Valencian, like its central dialect and modern northern dialects, except traditional and educated speakers), it has merged with the bilabial /b/ so that [b] (viu [ˈbiw] 'he/she lives') and [β] (ella viu [ˈeʎə ˈβiw] (C) / [ˈeʎɐ ˈβiw] (NW) 'she lives') occur in complementary distribution.

- In Valencian, /v/ is realized as an approximant [ʋ] after continuants: avanç [ɐˈʋäns] (V) ('advance').
- In Mallorcan, [v] and [w] are in complementary distribution, with [v] occurring before vowels (e.g., blava [ˈbɫɑvə] (M) 'blue' [f.] vs. blau [ˈbɫɑw] (M) 'blue' [m.]).
- In other varieties that have both sounds, they are in contrast before vowels, with neutralization in favor of [w] before consonants.

In Mallorcan and Menorcan, /f/ undergoes total assimilation to a following consonant (just as stops do): buf gros [ˈbuɡ‿ˈɡɾɔ̞s] (M / Me) ('large puff').

In Aragonese Catalan (especially Ribagorçan) and parts of Central Valencian (known as apitxat), voiced fricatives are missing (i.e., /z/ has merged with /s/: casa [ˈkäzɐ] in Standard Valencian → [ˈkäsɐ] (CV) 'house', and /v/ has merged with /b/: viu [ˈviw] in Standard Valencian → [ˈbiw] (CV) 'he/she lives').

The dental fricative /θ/ only appears in Ribagorçan and Lower Aragon, in contrast with /s/. Spanish loanwords with this sound may be replaced by /s/ in both Catalan and Valencian.

The fricative /x/ is found in Spanish interferences, especially in Aragon and Southern Valencia. Phonetically, it varies between velar [x] and uvular [χ], as in Spanish.

The glottal fricative /h/ is found in loanwords and interjections, although /h/ is usually replaced by /x/ in loanwords.

=== Sonorants ===
==== Laterals ====
Laterals assimilate the place of articulation of the following consonant (see "Assimilations" below). The lateral /l/ may be geminated in careful speech (e.g., iŀlusió [iɫːuziˈo] (C / NW) 'illusion'). A geminated /ʎː/ may also occur (e.g., ratlla [ˈraʎːə] (C) / [ˈraʎːɐ] (NW) 'line').

- While "dark (velarized) l", [ɫ], may be a positional allophone of /l/ in most dialects (such as in the syllable coda; e.g., mil [ˈmiɫ] (E / W) 'thousand'), /l/ is dark irrespective of position in Eastern dialects like Mallorcan and Standard Eastern Catalan (e.g., tela [ˈtəɫə] (M) / [ˈtɛɫə] (C) 'cloth', 'fabric').
  - In Valencian, /l/ has two main allophones: dark l and clear l, with [ɫ] (dark l) ocurring in final position, before nasal or a stressed vowel (e.g., sal 'salt', palma 'palm', volar 'to fly'), and [l] (clear l) in the rest of cases.
- In Aragonese Catalan (including Ribagorçan), /l/ is palatalized to [ʎ] in consonant clusters; e.g., clau [ˈkʎaw] (Ar) ('key').
- In Algherese and Ribagorçan word-final /ʎ/ is depalatized to [l]: gall [ˈɡäl] (A / R) ('rooster').

==== Nasals ====
Nasals assimilate the place of articulation of the following consonant (see "Assimilations" below). In careful speech, /n/ and /m/ may be geminated (e.g., innecessari [inːəsəˈsäɾi] (C) / [inːeseˈsäɾi] (NW) 'unnecessary', emmagatzemar [əmːəɣəd͡zəˈmä] (C) / [emːɐɣɐd͡zeˈmä] (NW) 'to store').

- In Algherese and Ribagorçan word-final /ɲ/ is depalatized to [n]: any [ˈän] (A / R) ('year').

==== Rhotics ====
The distribution of the two rhotics /r/ and /ɾ/ closely parallels that of Spanish. Wheeler analyzes intervocalic [r] as the result of gemination of a single rhotic phoneme: serra /ˈsɛɾɾə/ or /ˈsɛɾɾa/ → [ˈsɛrə] (C) / [ˈsɛrɐ] (NW) 'saw', 'mountains' (this is similar to the common analysis of Spanish and Portuguese rhotics).

- Between vowels, the two contrast (e.g., mirra [ˈmirə] (C) / [ˈmirɐ] (NW) 'myrrh' vs. mira [ˈmiɾə] (C) / [ˈmiɾɐ] (NW) 'he/she looks'), but they are otherwise in complementary distribution. [ɾ] appears in the onset, except in word-initial position (ruc 'donkey'), after /l/, /n/, and /s/ (folre 'lining', honra 'honour', Israel 'Israel'), and in compounds (infraroig 'infrared'), where [r] is used.
  - Mallorcan contrasts /r/ and /ɾ/ in word final position, e.g., xerr [ˈt͡ʃɛ̞r] (M) ('I speak') vs. mor [ˈmɔ̞ɾ] (M) ('he/she dies'). Note the minimal pair corr (M) ('I run') vs. cor (M) ('heart') shows no contrast as Mallorcan tend to omit final ⟨r⟩ (/ɾ/) in most cases.
  - In Mallorcan final /ɾ/ + [n] can be assimilated to [nː] (e.g., carn [ˈcanː] (M) 'meat').
- Different dialects vary in regards to rhotics in the coda, with Valencian, south-west Catalonia and Balearic (except Menorcan) generally featuring [ɾ̥] and Central Catalan dialects like those of Barcelona or Girona featuring a weakly trilled [r̥̆] unless it precedes a vowel-initial word in the same prosodic unit, in which case [ɾ] appears (e.g., mar [ˈmär̥̆] 'sea', but mar Egeu [ˈmäɾ‿əˈʒɛw] 'Aegean Sea').
  - Note that non-silent final ⟨r⟩ is transcribed as /ɾ/ in both standard transcriptions of Catalan and Valencian, regardless of the next sounds or in absolute final position.
- An alveolar approximant [ɹ] is a possible variant of the tap /ɾ/ in all post-vocalic contexts in the varieties that avoid the short trill (Valencian, south-west Catalonia and most Balearic speakers): encara [əŋˈkɑɹə] (B) / [ɑŋˈkɑɹɐ] (V) ('yet, still'). In the south-western varieties (i.e., Valencian), [ɹ] can often be elided (e.g., [ɑŋˈkɑɹɐ] → [ɑŋˈkɑ] (V)).
- In Northern Catalonia and in some accents of Mallorcan (e.g., Sóller dialect), a uvular trill [ʀ] or approximant [ʁ] can be heard instead of the alveolar trill /r/; e.g., córrer [ˈkuʀə] ~ [ˈkuʁə] (N) / [ˈkoʀə] ~ [ˈkoʁə] (M, from Sóller) ('to run'). An uvular trill or approximant may also occur as a realization of /ɾ/ in Northern Catalan.

== Vowels ==
Vowels of Catalan
	Front	Central	Back
Close	i (y)		u
Close-mid	e	ə*	o
Mid	(ø)^{2}	ə*	
Open-mid^{1}	ɛ	ə*	ɔ
Open	a		

Vowels in parentheses () are rare and vowels with an asterisk * are phonemic dialectally.

Chart notes:

- ^1 Open-mid vowels are lower (i.e., near-open or open vowels) in Valencian and in some Balearic subdialects.
- ^2 More frequently represented as [œ] (found, for instance, in Capcir, in Northern Catalan) in Catalan Studies.

Phonetic notes:

- The vowel /a/ ([ä] in General Catalan) is further back and open than the Castilian counterpart in North-Western and Central Catalan (i.e., it approaches [ɑ] in isolation or in a neutral environment), it is slightly fronted and closed in Valencian and North-Western Catalan, including Ribagorçan ([ä ~ ɐ], also represented as [ä̝], or [ɐ̞], due to its lower quality in comparison with the Barcelonan [ɐ]), and further fronted and closed ([a ~ æ]) in Mallorcan.
  - Stressed /a/ can be further retracted to [ɑ] in contact with velar consonants (including the velarized [ɫ]), and fronted to [a] in contact with palatals.
    - The palatal pronunciation of /a/ may merge with /ɛ/ by some speakers.
- The central vowel /ə/ in stressed position is found in Mallorcan and part of Menorcan and Ibizan, in the Balearic Islands.
  - The realization of the reduced vowel ⟨ə⟩ varies from mid [ə] to near-open [ɐ], with the latter variant being the most usual in the Barcelona metropolitan area, where the pronunciation between [ə] and /a/ is less pronounced than in other varieties where this vowel is found.
    - In some subvariants (e.g., Solsonès), it has a more back pronunciation (including velarization and length), like [ʌːˠ] (also ambiguously represented as [ʌ̃ː]).
  - It has been noted that the central mid vowel (both stressed and unstressed) is slightly closer and more rounded (approaching [ɵ]) in Mallorcan than in Central Catalan. An intensification of this articulatory characteristic can perhaps be observed in the rounded realization of the stressed variant in some local towns, regardless of the context.
- The open-mid /ɛ/ and /ɔ/ are lower [æ] (or [ɛ̞]) and [ɒ̝] (or [ɔ̞]) in Mallorcan, Menorcan and Valencian.
  - /ɛ/ is slightly more open and centralized before liquids /l, ɾ, r/.
  - /ɔ/ is most often a back vowel. In some dialects (like Mallorcan and Southern Valencian) it can be unrounded.
- /e/ and /o/ can be realized as mid vowels [e̞, o̞] in some cases. This occurs more often with /o/.
  - A five to six vowel system (i.e., without /ɛ/ or /ɔ/ or both), can be found in some areas. In Northern Catalan (including transitional Northern–Central zones), Modern Algherese and some places bordering the Aragonese and Spanish-speaking areas, open-mid and close-mid vowels may merge into mid vowels; [e̞] or [o̞] or both. In the local speech of Girona, /o/ and /ɔ/ merge. In Ribagorça and Lower Aragon, there is occasional diphthongization, as in Aragonese.
- The close vowels /i, u/ are more open than in Castilian. Unstressed /i, u/ are centralized.
  - In many dialects (e.g., Valencian and most Balearic accents) /i, u/ can be further open and centralized, especially in unstressed position, approaching [ɪ, ʊ].
- Northern Catalan sometimes adds two loan rounded vowels, [y] and [ø̞] (or slightly lower [œ̝]) from French and Occitan (e.g., but [ˈbyt] 'aim', fulles [ˈfø̞jəs] 'leaves').
  - Similarly French /y/ and /ø/ (and/or /œ/) are mostly adapted with [u ~ i] (e.g., déjà vu) and [e] (e.g., amateur), respectively.
- Phonetic nasalization occurs for vowels occurring between nasal consonants or when preceding a syllable-final nasal: muntó [mũn̪ˈto] ('a lot'). For simplicity, this is not transcribed in the article.
  - Possible nasalized vowel allophones are: [ã, ɑ̃, ə̃ / ɐ̃, ẽ, ɛ̃, ĩ, õ, ɔ̃, ũ] (in most of Balearic and Valencian, also [æ̃, ɪ̃, ɒ̃, ʊ̃]).
- Vowel length is contextual; e.g., coordinació [kuːɾðinəsiˈo] (C) / [koːɾðinɐsiˈo] (NW) ('coordination').
  - Possible long vowels are: [əː], [iː], [uː] in most Eastern Catalan dialects (in most of Mallorcan: [əː], [ɪː], [oː], [ʊː]); and [äː], [eː], [iː], [oː], [uː] in North-Western Catalan (Valencian: [äː], [eː], [ɪː], [oː], [ʊː], plus /aː/ from the -ada suffix).

=== Stressed vowels ===
Vowels of Standard Eastern Catalan

Vowels of Valencian

Most varieties of Catalan contrast seven stressed vowel phonemes. However, some Balearic dialects have an additional stressed vowel phoneme (/ə/); e.g., sec /ˈsək/ ('dry'). The stressed schwa of these dialects usually corresponds to /ɛ/ in Central Catalan and /e/ in Western Catalan varieties (that is, Central and Western Catalan dialects differ in their incidence of /e/ and /ɛ/, with /e/ appearing more frequently in Western Catalan; e.g., Central Catalan sec /ˈsɛk/ vs. Western Catalan sec /ˈsek/ ('dry'). For a list showing the frequency of these vowels, see "retention of /ɛ/ and /ɔ/ in Catalan and Valencian" and "development of /ə/ in Balearic Catalan").

Contrasting series of the main Catalan dialects:

Central Catalan [E]
LS	IPA	Gloss
sac	a (Note: /a/ has the allophones [a] (or [æ]) and [ɑ].)	'bag'
sec	ɛ	'I sit'
sec	ɛ	'dry'
sec	e	'fold'
sic	i	'sic'
soc	ɔ	'clog'
soc	o	'I am'
suc	u	'juice'

Balearic Catalan [E]
LS	IPA	Gloss
sac	a	'bag'
sec	ɛ (Note: In Valencian, Mallorcan and parts of Menorcan /ɛ/ is [æ] and /ɔ/ is near [ɒ].)	'I sit'
sec	ə (Note: Eastern Menorcan and some parts of the island of Ibiza (Eivissa) do not have stressed /ə/.)	'dry'
sec	e	'fold'
sic	i	'sic'
soc	ɔ	'clog'
soc	o	'I am'
suc	u	'juice'

W. Catalan & Algherese [E]
LS	IPA	Gloss
sac	a	'bag'
sec	ɛ	'I sit'
sec	e	'dry'
sec	e	'fold'
sic	i	'sic'
soc	ɔ	'clog'
soc	o	'I am'
suc	u	'juice'

Northern & Mod. Algherese [E]
LS	IPA	Gloss
sac	a	'bag'
sec	e	'I sit'
sec	e	'dry'
sec	e	'fold'
sic	i	'sic'
soc	o (Note: In Northern Catalan, many instances of stressed /o/ merges with /u/.)	'clog'
soc	o	'I am'
suc	u (Note: In Northern Catalan, /u/ can be realized as [y] and [ø] in some cases.)	'juice'

=== Reduced vowels ===
Reduced vowels in the main Catalan dialects:

General Eastern Catalan
Term	IPA	Gloss
parla	ə (Note: In Barcelona, it can become near-open [ɐ].) (Note: In Algherese, it becomes open [a] (or it approaches near-open, [ɐ]).)	'speech'
rere	ə	'back'
lliri	i	'lily'
ferro	u	'iron'
mutu	u	'mutual'

Mallorcan Balearic [Eastern Catalan]
Term	IPA	Gloss
parla	ə	'speech'
rere	ə	'back'
lliri	i (Note: In Valencian and Balearic, unstressed /i/ and /u/ can be pronounced as [ɪ] and [ʊ], respectively.)	'lily'
ferro	o (Note: In Mallorcan, pretonic /o/ merges with /u/ in words that contain a close tonic vowel.) (Note: In the local Sóller dialect, unstressed /o/ is normally realized as [u] (or [ʊ]), like in the rest of Eastern dialects.)	'iron'
mutu	u	'mutual'

General Western Catalan
Term	IPA	Gloss
parla	a (Note: In Valencian and North-Western Catalan, unstressed /a/ approaches [ɐ], although it is not especially much different from stress /a/.)	'speech'
rere	e	'back'
lliri	i	'lily'
ferro	o	'iron'
mutu	u	'mutual'

Notes:

In Eastern Catalan, vowels in unstressed position reduce to three: /a/, /e/, /ɛ/ → [ə] (also phonetically [ɐ] in Barcelona); /o/, /ɔ/ → [u], and /i/ and /u/ remain unchanged. So the unstressed vowel inventory in Eastern Catalan is essentially [ə, i, u]. However, there are some dialectal differences: Algherese merges /a/, /e/ and /ɛ/ with /a/; and in most areas of Mallorca, [o] can appear in unstressed position (that is, /o/ and /ɔ/ are usually reduced to [o]). (The unstressed phones [ɪ] and [ʊ] can also be found in the Balearic dialects instead of [i] and [u]).

- Unstressed [ə]:
  - It may be elided in contact with rhotics (e.g., barana [bəˈɾänə] → [ˈbɾänə] 'railing', taronja [təˈɾɔɲʒə] → [ˈtɾɔɲʒə] 'orange', veritat [bəɾiˈtät] → [bɾiˈtät] 'true', però [pəˈɾɔ] → [ˈpɾɔ] 'but',), this is partially reflected in the orthography: cargol (Standard Catalan) vs. caragol (Standard Valencian) ('snail'). It is also observed in three combinations with the preposition per (usually meaning 'for', 'by', 'per'): per això [pəɾ əˈʃɔ] → [pəɾˈʃɔ] ('because of this'), per aquí [pəɾ əˈki] → [pəɾˈki] ('around here') and per allà [pəɾ əˈʎa] → [pəɾˈʎa] ('around there'). This also occurs in per a ('for'), which in rapid speech can be reduced to per ([pəɾ ə] → [pəɾ]), which can cause ambiguity.
  - [ə] can also be omitted in rapid speech in the verb anar [əˈnä] → [ˈnä] ('to go'); e.g., vols anar? [ˈbɔɫz‿əˈnä] → [ˌbɔɫzˈnä] ('do you want to go?'), in the word adeu [əˈðew] → [ˈdew] ('goodbye') and in contact with other vowels (e.g., quina hora és? [ˈkinə ˈɔɾə ˈes] → [ˌkin‿ˈɔɾə ˈes] 'what time is it?', el que hem dit [əɫ kə ˈɛm ˈdit] → [əɫ ˈkɛm ˈdit] 'what we have said').
- Unstressed /i/ (stays mostly unchanged):
  - In some Eastern Catalan accents unstressed /i/ is pronounced as a semivowel ([j]) before after another vowel with the digraph ⟨ix⟩: caixa [ˈkajʃə], this is akin to many Western Catalan dialects. In Standard Eastern Catalan it is silent ([ˈkaʃə]).
- Unstressed /u/ (stays mostly unchanged):
  - It may be elided in the expression si us plau → [sisˈpɫɑw] ('please').
- Unstressed /a/, /e/ and /o/ appear only in some words (often due to vowel harmony, see below), especially in learned terms from other languages (e.g., allegro [ɑɫˈɫeɣɾo] 'allegro', oceans [useˈäns] 'oceans', ego [ˈeɣo] 'ego') and in the unstressed diphthong /ow/ [ow], which varies with [əw] in informal speech (e.g., mouré [mowˈɾe] or [məwˈɾe] 'I will move'). In other cases, they merge with [ə] and [u] (Wheeler (2005:61–72)).

Other cases:

- Stressed /e/ may rarely undergo univerbation if accompanied by another word and be pronounced as a single oxytone word, causing the reduction of /e/ to [ə] in Eastern dialects (e.g., és clar [ˈes ˈkɫɑ] → [əsˈkɫɑ] 'of course').
- Similar cases occur with stressed /o/ being reduced to [u] (e.g., més o menys [ˈmez‿o ˈmɛɲʃ] → [ˈmez‿u ˈmɛɲʃ] 'more or less').
- In Balearic and some Central Catalan accents, unstressed initial [o] can diphthongize to [əw], similar to RP go /ɡəʊ/; e.g., olor [əwˈɫo]) 'smell' (n.). This is regarded as non-standard.

In Western Catalan (which includes Valencian and North-Western Catalan), vowels in unstressed position reduce to five: /e/, /ɛ/ → [e]; /o/, /ɔ/ → [o]; /a/ (except in some cases), /i/, /u/ remain unchanged, those vowels are [a, e, i, o, u] (the phone [ɐ] is now more frequent in Western dialects, and the phones [ɪ], [ʊ] can be found instead of [i], [u] in southern varieties, like Valencian). In many Western dialects reduced vowels tend to merge into different realizations in some cases, sometimes unpredictably (the following examples are in Valencian):

- Unstressed /a/:
  - It is usually close to [ɐ] (without assimilation).
    - In some Western accents [ə] may occur.
  - Post-tonic final unstressed /a/ becomes [ɛ] and/or [ɔ] (phonetically lower or centralized or both) when preceded by a syllable with stressed /ɛ/ and/or /ɔ/; e.g., tela /ˈtɛla/ → [ˈtɛ̞lɛ̞̈] 'cloth', 'fabric'; hora /ˈɔɾa/ → [ˈɔ̞ɾɔ̞̈] 'hour'. For further details, see "vowel harmony" below.
    - In a wider sense, vowel assimilations can occur in further instances (that is all or most instances of final unstressed /а/, regardless of the preceding sounds and involving palatalization or velarization or both): xica [ˈt͡ʃikɛ̞̈] or [ˈt͡ʃikɔ̞̈] ('girl'). This is considered non-standard.
    - A characteristic feature of the pronunciation of some North-Western speakers is the pronunciation of the unstressed final /a/ as [ɛ], regardless of the preceding sounds; e.g., Lleida [ˈʎejðɛ] ('Lleida'), pronounced [ˈʎejðɐ] (or broader [ˈʎejða]) in General Western Catalan and [ˈʎejðə] in Eastern Catalan.
  - It is accepted in Valencian the pronunciation of the suffix -ista as [-iste] in the masculine form, thus artista 'artist' (m.) is pronounced [äɾˈtiste].
- Unstressed /e/:
  - It may merge with /a/ before a nasal or sibilant consonant (e.g., entens [ɐn̪ˈtens] 'you understand', escoltar [ɐskoɫ̪ˈtäɾ] 'to listen'), in some environments before any consonant (e.g., terròs [tɐˈrɔ̞s] 'clod (of earth)', 'lump'), and, sometimes, in monosyllabic clitics.
  - It may merge into /i/ when in contact with palatal consonants (e.g., senyor [sɪˈɲoɾ] 'lord'). Rarely initial es- can become [ɪs-]; e.g., estiu [ɪsˈtiw] ('summer'), and it may alternate with the more frequently sequence [ɐs-] (and sometimes also [es-]): [ɐsˈtiw]. In Standard Valencian, /e/ → /i/ ([ɪ]) is only accepted in terms with the suffix -ixement: naixement [nɐjʃɪˈmen̪t] ('birth').
- Unstressed /i/ (stays mostly unchanged).
- Unstressed /o/:
  - It may merge with /u/ before a bilabial consonant (e.g., cobert [kʊˈbɛ̞ɾt] 'covered', 'cutlery'), before a stressed syllable with a close (or high) vowel (e.g., sospira [sʊsˈpiɾɐ] 'he/she sighs'). Furthermore, in some rare cases, it can also be reduced in contact with palatals (e.g., Josep [d͡ʒʊˈzɛ̞p] 'Joseph'), and, sometimes in some local dialects, in monosyllabic clitics.
  - Note in some colloquial speeches (similar to Eastern Catalan dialects) initial unstressed /o/ can diphthongize to /aw/ [ɑw] (phonetically [ɐw]); e.g., olor [ɐwˈɫoɾ]) 'smell' (n.). This is regarded as non-standard.
- Unstressed /u/ (stays mostly unchanged).
- The phones /ɛ/ ([ɛ̞]) and /ɔ/ ([ɔ̞]):
  - Besides vowel harmony or vowel assimilation (see below), unstressed /ɛ/ and /ɔ/ (i.e., phonetically lower or centralized or both) may be found sporadically in compounds like dèsset [ˈdɛ̞sɛ̞t] (V) 'seventeen' and dènou (or dèneu) [ˈdɛ̞nɔ̞w] (or [ˈdɛ̞nɛ̞w]) (V) 'nineteen'.

=== Vowel harmony ===
The harmony of Valencian is a clear example of harmony conditioned by a strong element: in some Valencian dialects, word-final post-tonic /a/ becomes [ɛ] and [ɔ]—usually lower or centralized or both: [ɛ̞̈] (also transcribed with [æ]) and [ɔ̞̈] ([ɒ])—when the preceding syllable contains tonic open-mid (or more precisely "near-open") vowels /ɛ/ and /ɔ/; that is, /ɛ/ and /ɔ/ propagate the front and back features, respectively, to the final vowel /a/, as the examples. The articulatory features extend from a phonologically privileged position—the stressed syllable—to a weak position—an unstressed syllable—a perceptual asymmetry emphasized by the fact that the harmony trigger belongs to the radical while the assimilated segment is normally an inflectional affix.

a)
Example	IPA	Translation
terra	[ˈtɛrɛ]	'Earth', 'land'
tela	[ˈtɛlɛ]	'cloth', 'fabric'
pela	[ˈpɛlɛ]	'he/she peels'
perla	[ˈpɛɾlɛ]	'pearl'

b)
Example	IPA	Translation
cosa	[ˈkɔzɔ]	'thing'
mora	[ˈmɔɾɔ]	'Moor' (f.)
tova	[ˈtɔvɔ]	'soft' (f.)
vora	[ˈvɔɾɔ]	'edge', 'shore'

In the most widespread system of harmony, both open-mid vowels cause assimilation; in other systems, distributed over the harmonic territory quite randomly, only one of the vowels triggers the change. For example, in Cullera only the front vowel causes assimilation, while in Borriana the back vowel is the only one that allows harmony. However, in both the broadest and the narrowest versions, and even in the sporadic cases of two-way harmony that are presented here, the pattern of strong → weak extension remains constant.

In the harmonic phenomenon just described, articulatory features spread from left to right. However, there is no shortage of assimilations in which the features spread to the left of the prominent position. This occurs in Mallorcan when pretonic /o/ is closed to [u] in words that contain a close tonic vowel; e.g., c[u]nill, c[u]sí, c[u]mú (cf. Veny Clar (1982)). The change involves the extension of the height feature again in the direction dictated by the strong → weak saliency relationship. Similar closures are documented in various Western languages; among these, Tortosan stands out, where the phenomenon, quite variable and often limited to the elderly, presents the peculiarity that height does not only propagate from tonic vowels, but can also do so from unstressed ones (cfr. Morales). In general terms, and in accordance with the data collected by Morales (in prep.), a pretonic mid vowel may become close under the influence of a close vowel with the same point of articulation—palatal or labial—in a following syllable; in this way, vowel sequences of the type e...i and o...u become i...i a) and u...u b), respectively. The assimilation of mid vowels to a high vowel of a different point of articulation is possible, but in the sequence e...u it is reduced to some words c), and in the sequence o...i it is usually limited to fossilized cases, so that the disharmonious alternatives in d) reflect only copied pronunciations of the orthography.

a)
Example	IPA	Translation
melic	[miˈlik]	'belly button'
delicat	[diliˈkat]	'delicate'

b)
Example	IPA	Translation
absolut	[apsuˈlut]	'absolute'
bromur	[bɾuˈmuɾ]	'bromide'

c)
Example	IPA	Translation
betum	[biˈtum]	'betumen'
menut	[miˈnut]	'small'

d)
Example	IPA	Translation
avorrir	[aβuˈriɾ]	'to bore'
botiga	[buˈtiɣa]	'shop'

Of the phenomena presented above, the most common and systematic is the change e...i → i...i. As in the examples, /e/ becomes [i] when it precedes a stressed /i/ or unstressed /i/. Closure can even affect a series of two pretonic vowels. Assimilation never affects stressed vowels and there is also no harmony when /e/ and /i/ do not occupy adjacent syllables.

With certain restrictions, the phenomenon can modify the final vowel of the first element of a compound and proclitic elements such as numerals or unstressed pronouns. In the last case, when the vowel of the pronoun is not strictly adjacent to the syllable that triggers the harmony, there is no assimilation; according to Morales (in prep.), the lack of spread is related to the fact that groups of pronouns generate a secondary accent, which would protect the original quality of the vowel.

Morales also reports some examples of rightward (regressive) assimilation between weak elements; that is, cases where an unstressed sequence i...e becomes i...i. Harmony to the right is documented only between vowels that are in pretonic position; therefore, the inflectional elements and the post-tonic vowels belonging to the radical are excluded from the change.

General Valencian is another variety in which the extension of features is limited to the main metric foot: in plain words, the final post-tonic, which is part of the main foot, is affected by harmony a); on the other hand, in proparoxytone words (esdrúixoles) the final does not belong to the main foot and is, therefore, beyond the scope of assimilation b). In Valencian from the south of Alicante, the harmony affects an intermediate layer between the main metrical foot and the clitic group: the prosodic word (PPr) (cfr. Montoya (1989), Segura (1996), Beltran (2008)).

Harmony in General Valencian:

a)
Example	IPA	Translation
afecta	[ɐˈfɛktɛ]	'affects'
granota	[ɡɾɐˈnɔtɔ]	'frog'

b)
Example	IPA	Translation
mèdica	[ˈmɛðɪkɐ]	'medic' (f.)
ròtula	[ˈrɔtʊlɐ]	'kneecap'

Harmony from Southern Valencian (Alicante):

a)
Example	IPA	Translation
afecta	[ɛˈfɛktɛ]	'affects'
granota	[ɡɾɔˈnɔtɔ]	'frog'

While harmonic patterns affecting just the final post-tonic /a/ within the morphological word domain are often attested in Southern Valencian varieties, recent phonetic evidence (Herrero (2022)) shows that the harmonic domain is not uniformly restricted to morphological boundaries. This new empirical evidence reveals that harmony may extend beyond the lexical word in specific prosodic configurations, challenging traditional descriptions and motivating a re-examination of the factors that regulate its scope. In particular, vowel harmony is also found when oxytone verbs are followed by the enclitic /la/, as in perd-la /ˈpɛɾd.la/ → [ˈpɛɾlɛ] 'lose it' (f.), cou-la /ˈkɔw.la/ → [ˈkɔwlɔ] 'cook it' (f.), where harmony reaches the clitic vowel. However, two asymmetries arise when sequences of a verb plus a clitic are involved. First, while assimilation is nearly categorical in canonical word-internal contexts (e.g., tela, cosa), only 75–85% of oxytone + clitic tokens display harmony. Second, in paroxytone verbs followed by the same enclitic /la/, assimilation consistently targets the post-tonic vowel of the verb but (usually) never extends to the clitic: serra-la /ˈsɛra.la/ → [ˈsɛrɛlɐ] 'saw it' (f.), toca-la /ˈtɔka.la/ → [ˈtɔkɔlɐ] 'touch it' (f.).

In the harmony of Valencian, Mallorcan and, mostly, Tortosan, the features extend from a strong element to a weak element. In the other possible model, on the other hand, the features are spread in the reverse direction, that is, from positions that are not prominent to positions that are stronger from the perceptual point of view. The trigger for change is in this case a weak element (cf. Walker (2005)). Central Catalan provides an example of harmony—with considerable geographical and idiolectal variation—conditioned by segments located in weak positions. In this dialect, stressed mid vowels in words from other languages tend to be adapted as open mids, as in the paroxytones in example a), with regular reduction in the unstressed syllable, that is, with the vowels [ə], [i] and [u] in this position. Borrowings also have the peculiarity that they tend to block the neutralization of the unstressed middle vowels e and o, which are realized as [e] and [o], respectively. In principle, these two trends should not be mutually exclusive; however, if the post-tonic sound is close-mid, the tonic mids are usually also realized as close, as shown by the plain words in example b), in which the levelling between the two vowels is almost universal. Therefore, the quality of the most prominent vowel is determined by the features of the following vowel, since the appearance of close-mid vowels in tonic position depends on the presence of vowels of the same pitch in the post-tonic syllable.

a)
Example	IPA	Translation
Creta	[ˈkɾɛtə]	'Crete'
euro	[ˈɛwɾu]	'Euro'
Betty	[ˈbɛti]	'Betty'
Rodes	[ˈrɔðəs]	'Rhodes'
poli	[ˈpɔli]	'cop'
gnosi	[ˈnɔzi]	'gnosis'

b)
Example	IPA	Translation
Lesbos	[ˈlezβos]	'Lesbos'
euro	[ˈewɾo]	'Euro'
Bette	[ˈbete]	'Bette'
Rodos	[ˈroðos]	'Rodos'
polo	[ˈpolo]	'polo'
Cnossos	[ˈnosos]	'Knossos'

In proparoxytones there is greater variability. In the variety analyzed by Cabré Castellví (2009) esdrúixol words (i.e., words with stressed on the antepenultimate syllable) are generally subject to the same restrictions and the presence of a close mid in post-tonic position implies the presence of close mids in tonic position a); the syllabic adjacency between the two vowels is key to harmony, since words like Sòcrates [ˈsɔkɾətes] or Hèrcules [ˈɛrkules] are usually presented without assimilation despite the presence of an unreduced post-tonic e. In the variety described by Bonet Alsina, Lloret-Romanyach & Mascaró Altimiras (2007), on the other hand, post-tonic vowels do not condition the realization of the tonic vowel in esdrúixols b). On the other hand, and in accordance with the interpretation of the aforementioned authors, the adaptation of tonic vowels as open mids is compatible in all varieties with the appearance of unreduced mid vowels in pre-tonic syllables.

a)
Example	IPA	Translation
Jespersen	[ˈʒespeɾsen]	'Jespersen'
Penèlope	[peˈnelope]	'Penelope'
Hölderlin	[ˈxoldeɾlin]	'Hölderlin'

b)
Example	IPA	Translation
Jespersen	[ˈʒɛspeɾsen]	'Jespersen'
Penèlope	[peˈnɛlope]	'Penelope'
Sòfocles	[ˈsɔfokles]	'Sophocles'

Other harmony examples in Central Catalan:

Example	IPA
Everest	[eβeˈɾɛst]
Interpol	[inteɾˈpɔl]

Example	IPA
OPEC	[oˈpɛk]
Repsol	[repˈsɔl]

Example	IPA
Flaubert	[floˈβɛɾt]
Montessori	[monteˈsɔɾi]

=== Vowels in contact ===
One of the most unique features of Catalan and Valencian is the treatment of vowels that come into contact within the speech chain. When a word-final vowel meets an initial vowel there are two possible reactions: lengthening (if both vowels are the same) or weakening/elision of one of the vowels (if they are different). In general terms, two consecutive vowels diphthongize more frequently in Valencian, North-Western Catalan and Algherese. Some examples (in Valencian):

Lengthening

- /a/ followed by /a/; e.g., viu a Alacant [ˈviw.äːlɐˈkän̪t] ('he/she lives in Alicante').
- /e/ followed by /e/; e.g., he eixit ara [ˌeːiˈʃit ˈäɾɐ] ('I have come out now').
- /i/ followed by /i/; e.g., platges i illots [ˈplad͡ʒez‿ɪːˈʎɔ̞t͡s] ('beaches and islets').
- /o/ followed by /o/; e.g., escrit o oral? [esˈkɾit oːˈɾɑɫ] ('written or oral?').
- /u/ followed by /u/; e.g., una tribu urbana [ˈunɐ ˈtɾibʊːɾˈbänɐ] ('An urban tribe').

Elision

- Unstressed /a/ (∅) followed by stressed /ɔ̞/ → [ɔ̞]; e.g., quina hora és? [ˌkin‿ˈɔ̞ɾɔ̞ ˈes] or [ˌkin‿ˈɔɾɐ ˈes] ('what time is it?').
- Stressed /a/ followed by unstressed /e/ (∅) → [ä]; e.g., mà esquerra [ˈmä ˈskɛ̞rɛ̞] or [ˈmä ˈskɛ̞rɐ] ('left hand').
- Unstressed /a/ followed by unstressed /e/ (∅) → [ɐ]; e.g., agarra el gos [ɐˈɣɑrɐɫ ˈɣos] ('take the dog').
- Stressed /e/ (∅) followed by stressed /a/ → [ä]; e.g., què has fet? [ˈkäs ˈfet] ('what have you done?'). This case is rare.
- Unstressed /e/ (∅) followed by /ɔ̞/ → [ɔ̞]; e.g., este home [ˌest‿ˈɔ̞me] ('this man').
- Stressed /o/ followed by unstressed /e/ (∅) → [o]; e.g., no els volen [ˈnoɫz ˈvɔ̞len] ('they don't want them').

==== Diphthongs and triphthongs ====
There are also a number of phonetic diphthongs, all of which begin ("rising diphthongs") or end ("falling diphthongs") in /i/ [j] or /u/ [w]. There is also few triphthongs beginning and ending with a semivowel.

Falling diphthongs
IPA	word	gloss	IPA	word	gloss
[aj]	aigua	'water'	[aw] ([ɑw])	taula	'table'
[əj] (E) / [aj] (W) ([ɐj])	mainada	'children'	[əw] (E) / [aw] (W) ([ɐw])	caurem	'we will fall'
[ɛj]	oleic	'oleic'	[ɛw]	peu	'foot'
[ej]	rei	'king'	[ew]	seu	'his/her'
[əj] (E) / [ej] (W)	Eivissa	'Ibiza'	[əw] (E) / [ew] (W)	eufemisme	'euphemism'
[ij] (Note: The diphthong [ij] is mainly found in Balearic.) (B) ([iː])	novii	'bridegroom'	[iw]	niu	'nest'
[ɔj]	heroi	'hero'	[ɔw] (Note: [ɔw] ([ɒw]) may merge with [aw] ([ɑw]) in Southern Valencian.)	nou	'new'
			[ow] (Note: Unstressed [ow] may merge with [əw] in Eastern dialects.)	sou	'you are'
[uj] (E) / [oj] (W)	Moisès / Moisés	'Moses'	[ow]	mouré	'I will move'
[uj] (Note: Merges with [wi] in some dialects.)	cuit	'cooked'	[uw] ([uː])	duu	'he/she carries'
Rising diphthongs
IPA	word	gloss	IPA	word	gloss
[ja]	iaio	'grandpa'	[wa]	guant	'glove'
[jə] (E) / [ja] (W) ([jɐ])	feia	'he/she was doing'	[wə] (E) / [wa] (W) ([wɐ])	aquareŀla	'watercolour'
[jɛ]	Aielo	'Aielo'	[wɛ]	seqüència	'sequence'
[je]	seient	'seat'	[we]	ungüent	'ointment'
[jə] (E) / [je] (W)	laietans	'Laietani'	[wə] (E) / [we] (W)	qüestió	'question'
			[wi]	pingüí	'penguin'
[jɔ]	iode	'iodine'	[wɔ]	quòrum	'quorum'
[jo]	raió	'rayon'	[wo]	seuós	'greasy'
[ju] (E) / [jo] (W)	iogurt	'yoghurt'	[wu] (E) / [wo] (W)	quotidià	'daily', 'quotidian'
[ju]	iugoslau	'Yugoslav'			
Triphthongs
IPA	word	gloss	IPA	word	gloss
[jaj]	iai	'old person'	[waj]	Alguaire	'Alguaire'
			[wəj] (E) / [waj] (W) ([wɐj])	guaitar	'to observe', 'to look'
[jɛw] (E) / [jew] (W)	veieu	'you see'	[wɛw] (Note: [waw] in the Balearic dialects.) (E) / [wew] (W)	adeqüeu	'you adequate'
[jəw] (E) / [jew] (W)	dèieu	'you were saying'			

Notes:

In Standard Eastern Catalan, rising diphthongs (that is, those starting with [j] or [w]) are only possible in the following contexts:

- [j] in word-initial position; e.g., iogurt [juˈɣuɾt] ('yoghurt').
- The semivowel ([j] or [w]) occurs between vowels as in feia [ˈfɛjə] ('he/she was doing') or diuen [ˈdiwən] ('they say').
- In the sequences [ɡw] or [kw] plus vowel; e.g., guant ('glove'), quòrum ('quorum'), qüestió ('question'), pingüí ('penguin'); these exceptional cases even lead some scholars to hypothesize the existence of rare labiovelar phonemes /ɡʷ/ and /kʷ/.

In colloquial or informal Eastern Catalan the sequence /ea/ may be pronounced with an epethentic [j], breaking the hiatus (and becoming a diphthong); e.g., idea [iˈðeə] → [iˈðejə].

== Processes ==
There are certain instances of compensatory diphthongization in Mallorcan so that troncs /ˈtɾoncs/ ('logs') (in addition to deleting the palatal stop) develops a compensating palatal glide and surfaces as [ˈtɾojns] (and contrasts with the unpluralized [ˈtɾoɲc]). Diphthongization compensates for the loss of the palatal stop (segment loss compensation). There are other cases where diphthongization compensates for the loss of point of articulation features (property loss compensation) as in any [ˈaɲ] ('year') vs. anys [ˈajns] ('years').

The dialectal distribution of compensatory diphthongization is almost entirely dependent on the dorsal stop (/k ~ c/) and the extent of consonant assimilation (whether or not it is extended to palatals).

Voiced affricates are devoiced after stressed vowels in dialects like Eastern Catalan where there may be a correlation between devoicing and lengthening (gemination) of voiced affricates: metge /ˈmed͡ʒːə/ → [ˈmet͡ːʃə] ('medic'). In Barcelona, voiced stops may be fortified (geminated and devoiced); e.g., poble [ˈpɔpːɫə] 'village', 'people').

In (Mallorcan) Catalan is known the historical process of erasing the vowel (the nucleus) of unstressed final syllables. Burzio (1988) (cited by Kenstowicz (1994)) and Kaye (1990), have proposed similar theories, in that one or more 'extrasyllabic' final consonants represent the opening of a syllable with null vowel (Burzio) or empty nucleus (Kaye). However, in the case of Catalan, such a structure is fundamentally the one that has been proposed (e.g., in Mascaró Altimiras (1987)) to trigger vowel epenthesis in cases such as the followings:

- ampl /ˈampl/ → [ˈäm.pɫə] ('I wide')
- segl /ˈsɛɡl/ → [ˈsɛɡ.ɡɫə] ('I ?')
- aspr /ˈaspɾ/ → [ˈäs.pɾə] ('I stake', ag.)
- corr /ˈkoɾɾ/ → [ˈko(r).rə] ('I run')

=== Assimilations ===
Nasal			Lateral		
IPA	word	gloss	IPA	word	gloss
[ɱ]	ínfim	'lowest'			
[n̪]	anterior	'previous'	[ɫ̪]	altes	'tall' (f., pl.)
[ɲ]	engegar	'to start (up)'	[ʎ]	àlgid	'decisive'
[ŋ]	angle	'angle'			
[ŋn]	sagna	'he/she bleeds'			
[mː]	setmana	'week'			
[nː]	cotna	'rind'	[ɫː]	Betlem	'Bethlehem'
			[ʎː]	rotllo	'roll'

Catalan denti-alveolar stops can fully assimilate to the following consonant, producing gemination; this is particularly evident before nasal and lateral consonants; e.g., setmana ('week'), cotna ('rind'), Betlem ('Bethlehem'), rotllo ('roll'). Learned words can alternate between featuring and not featuring such assimilation (e.g., atles [ˈädɫəs] ~ [ˈɑɫːəs] (C) / [ˈädɫes] ~ [ˈɑɫːes] (NW) 'atlas', sotmetre [sudˈmɛtɾə] ~ [sumˈmɛtɾə] (C) / [sodˈmetɾe] ~ [somˈmetɾe] (NW) 'to submit', ètnic [ˈɛdnik] ~ [ˈɛnːik] (C / NW) 'ethnic').

There is dialectal variation regarding words with ⟨tll⟩. While Central and North-Western Catalan tend to innovate with a palatalized pronunciation [ʎː], Valencian and Balearic maintain the traditional pronunciation without palatalization [ɫː]; i.e., ⟨tl⟩, in most cases (e.g., ametlla vs. ametla 'almond').

Valencian dialects (especially Central Valencian) features simple elision in many of these cases (e.g setmana [seˈmänɐ] 'week', rotllo [ˈroʎo] 'roll') and learned words might not exhibit either assimilation or elision: atles [ˈädles] and administrar [ɐdmɪnɪsˈtɾäɾ].

== Prosody ==
=== Stress ===
Stress most often occurs on any of the last three syllables of a word (e.g., brúixola [ˈbɾu(j)ʃuɫə] (C) / [ˈbɾu(j)ʃoɫɐ] (NW) 'compass'; càstig [ˈkästik] (C / NW) 'punishment'; pallús [pəˈʎus] (C) / [pɐˈʎus] (NW) 'fool').

Compound words and adverbs formed with /ˈment/ may have a syllable with secondary stress (e.g., parallamps [ˌpäɾəˈʎam(p)s] (C) / [ˌpäɾɐˈʎam(p)s] (NW) 'lightning conductor', bonament [ˌbɔnəˈmen̪(t)] (C) / [ˌbɔnɐˈmen̪(t)] (NW) 'willingly') but every lexical word has just one syllable with main stress.

=== Rhythm ===
The presence of a binary rhythmic accent on the pretonic syllables of a word has been noted in Catalan. According to this tendency, there is an alternation between a weak syllable and a strong syllable, extending from the stressed syllable back to the first syllable of the word; thus, the word descomposéssiu ('you decomposed') would be pronounced with a primary stress and a secondary stress on the syllable com.

Analogously to syllable-timed and stress-timed languages Catalan shows final lengthening and a stress group duration which is proportional to the number of syllables within the group. Differently from syllable-timed languages such as Spanish, Catalan appears to favour anticipatory vs. carryover compression of stressed vowels within the stress group; analogously to Italian this trend is probably weaker than in stress-timed languages. Like other syllable-timed languages, positional realizations of [ə] differ little in duration and shorten when adjacent to unstressed syllables but not to stressed syllables.

=== Phonotactics ===
The structure of the syllable shows a mandatory nucleus, and the optional presence of a margin before and/or behind the nucleus. Core and margin contrast articulatory due to the fact that the core is emitted with a higher degree of oral opening than the margin. In Catalan and Valencian, the core position is occupied by a vowel and the margin position by one or more consonants. Depending on the number of consonants that make up the margin and the location of the margin in relation to the core, syllabic structures of the type V, CV, VC, CVC, CCV, CCVC, CCVCC, VCC, VCCC, CVCC, CVCCC, etc. are possible. The margin that precedes the nucleus is called "explosive", and the one that follows it, "implosive", syllables can be classified as "open" or "closed" by virtue of the absence or presence of a margin postnuclear, respectively.

Any consonant, as well as [j] and [w] may be an onset. Clusters may consist of a consonant plus a semivowel (C[j], C[w]) or an obstruent plus a liquid. Some speakers may have one of these obstruent-plus-liquid clusters preceding a semivowel; e.g., síndria [ˈsin.dɾjə] (C) / [ˈsin.dɾjɐ] (NW) ('watermelon'); for other speakers, this is pronounced [ˈsin.dɾi.ə] (C) / [ˈsin.dɾi.ɐ] (NW) (i.e., the semivowel must be syllabic in this context).

Word-medial codas are restricted to one consonant + [s] (extra [ˈɛks.tɾə] (C) / [ˈeks.tɾɐ] (NW) 'extra'). In the coda position, voice contrasts among obstruents are neutralized. Although there are exceptions (such as futur [fuˈtuɾ] 'future'), syllable-final rhotics (except in most Valencian dialects, although there are also exceptions) are often lost before a word boundary or before the plural morpheme of most words: color [kuˈɫo] (C) / [koˈɫo] (NW) ('color') vs. coloraina [kuɫuˈɾajnə] (C) / [koɫoˈɾajnɐ] (NW) ('bright color').

In Central Eastern (and North-Western Catalan), obstruents fail to surface word-finally when preceded by a homorganic consonant (e.g., /nt/ → [n̪]). Complex codas simplify only if the loss of the segment doesn't result in the loss of place specification.

Suffixation examples in Central Eastern and North-Western Catalan varieties
	Final		gloss	Internal		gloss
no cluster	camp	[ˈkäm]	'field'	camperol	[kəmpəˈɾɔɫ] (C) [kɐmpeˈɾɔɫ] (NW)	'peasant'
no cluster	punt	[ˈpun̪]	'point'	punta	[ˈpun̪tə] (C) [ˈpun̪tɐ] (NW)	'tip'
no cluster	banc	[ˈbaŋ]	'bank'	banca	[ˈbaŋkə] (C) [ˈbaŋkɐ] (NW)	'banking'
no cluster	malalt	[məˈɫɑɫ̪] (C) [mɐˈɫɑɫ̪] (NW)	'ill'	malaltia	[məɫəɫ̪ˈti.ə] (C) [mɐɫɐɫ̪ˈti.ɐ] (NW)	'illness'
cluster	hort	[ˈɔɾt]	'orchard'	hortalissa	[uɾtəˈɫisə] (C) [oɾtɐˈɫisɐ] (NW)	'vegetable'
cluster	gust	[ˈɡust]	'taste'	gustar	[ɡusˈtä]	'to taste'
cluster	serp	[ˈseɾp]	'snake'	serpentí	[səɾpənˈti] (C) [seɾpenˈti] (NW)	'snake-like'
cluster	disc	[ˈdisk]	'disk'	disquet	[disˈkɛt] (C) [disˈket] (NW)	'diskette'
cluster	remolc	[rəˈmɔɫk] (C) [reˈmɔɫk] (NW)	'trailer'	remolcar	[rəmuɫˈkä] (C) [remoɫ̪ˈkä] (NW)	'to tow'

When the suffix -erol [əˈɾɔɫ] (C) / [eˈɾɔɫ] (NW) is added to camp [ˈkäm] it makes [kəmpəˈɾɔɫ] / [kɐmpeˈɾɔɫ], indicating that the underlying representation is /ˈkamp/ (with subsequent cluster simplification), however when the copula [ˈes] is added it makes [ˈkäm ˈes]. The resulting generalization is that this underlying /p/ will only surface in a morphologically complex word. Despite this, word-final codas are not usually simplified in most of Balearic and Valencian (e.g., camp [ˈkämp], punt [ˈpun̪t]). Plural forms do not retain the obstruent (molt [ˈmoɫ̪] → molts [ˈmoɫ̪s] 'very', junt [ˈʒun̪] → junts [ˈʒun̪s] 'together'), but feminine forms do (moltes [ˈmoɫ̪təs], juntes [ˈʒun̪təs]). Unlike /ɾ/, this final plosive is not restored when combined with a pronoun (e.g., donant-la [duˈnän̪.ɫə] 'giving it').

Plurals ending in nasal + /ps/, nasal + /ts/ or lateral + /ts/ are reduced to nasal + [s] and lateral + [s] in all dialects (e.g., camps [ˈkäms], punts [ˈpun̪s], molts [ˈmoɫ̪s]), compare camp [ˈkäm], punt [ˈpun̪] and molt [ˈmoɫ̪] in Central but camp [ˈkämp], punt [ˈpun̪t] and molt [ˈmoɫ̪t] in Valencian and Balearic.

The word doncs ('then') can be pronounced either [ˈdɔns] or [ˈdɔŋs], regardless of the dialect.

Although the number vint ('twenty') is pronounced [ˈbin̪] in Eastern Catalan due to the reduction of /nt/ in [n̪], it regains its /t/ in numbers of its family (e.g., vint-i-cinc [ˌbin̪tiˈsiŋ] 'twenty-five'). In the same dialects, the word sant [ˈsän̪] ('saint') regains its /t/ if it is followed by a vowel of a noun (e.g., Sant Esteve [ˈsän̪t‿əsˈteβə] 'Saint Stephen') although there is hesitation among speakers. There is also hesitation about the words cent [ˈsen̪] ('one hundred') and vint [ˈbin̪] ('twenty') when they are combined with other nouns; ésAdir recommends pronouncing them with /t/ before the words anys ('years'), homes ('men'), and hores ('hours'), usually silent in other cases, with equally permissible hesitations (e.g., cent euros 'one hundred euros' [ˈsen̪ ˈɛwɾus] or [ˈsen̪t‿ˈɛwɾus]). In most other cases, the elided final consonant is not restored (unlike in French liaison) (e.g., vent estiuenc [ˈben̪ əstiˈwɛŋ] 'summer breeze', molt antic [ˈmoɫ̪ ən̪ˈtik] 'very old', malalt i ferit [məˈɫɑɫ̪ i fəˈɾit] 'sick and injured').

In informal speech in Eastern Catalan, the adverb on ('where') may be pronounced with an epethentic (paragoge) /t/: on és? [ˈon ˈes] → [ˈont‿ˈes] ('where is it?'). It is recommended to pronounce on without epenthesis. Similarly, in Central Catalan monosyllabic words with a pronounced final ⟨r⟩ get a reinforcement final consonant [t] when in absolute final position (e.g., final ⟨r⟩ of cor 'heart' in reina del meu cor [ˈrejnə ðəɫ ˈmew ˈkɔɾt] 'queen of my heart' vs. el cor es mou [əɫ ˈkɔɾ‿əz ˈmɔw] 'the heart is moving'). This also occurs in words ending in an unstressed /i/: col·legi [kuˈɫɛʒi] → [kuˈɫɛʒit] ('school'), premi [ˈpɾɛmi] → [ˈpɾɛmit] ('prize'). However, these pronunciations have become outdated even in colloquial speech.

In informal speech, an /n/ may be added to the preposition a, especially in the combinations "al" (a + el) and "a la", (a + la) which become "an el" and "an la": al noi [əɫ ˈnɔj] → an el noi [ən‿əɫ ˈnɔj] ('to the boy'), but this has also become outdated. This should not be confused with the form ""en el" ('in the'), which is correct (e.g., en la ciutat 'in the city').

In foreign terms starting with /s/ + consonant, like in spa and stop, an epethentic (prothesis) [ə] is inserted in Eastern Catalan, and [e] in Western Catalan: [əsˈpä] (E) / [esˈpä] (W), [əsˈtɔp] (E) / [esˈtɔp] (W). This is reflected in the orthography in adapted terms, such as estàndard (from English standard) or escàner (from English scanner).

The preposition amb ('with') in Eastern Catalan is usually pronounced [əm], but in careful speech when it is before a vowel sound or an /l/ it is pronounced [əmb]; e.g., amb u [əmb‿ˈu] (E) ('with one').

Word-initial clusters from Greco-Latin learned words tend to drop the first phoneme: gnom [ˈnom] (C / NW) ('gnome'), mnemotècnia [nəmuˈtɛŋniə] (C) / [nemoˈtɛŋniɐ] (NW) ('mnemotechnical'), pneumàtic [nəwˈmätik] (C) / [newˈmätik] (NW) ('pneumatic'), pseudònim [səwˈðɔnim] (C) / [sewˈðɔnim] (NW) ('pseudonym'), pterodàctil [təɾuˈðäktiɫ] (C) / [teɾoˈðäktiɫ] (NW) ('pterodactylus').

Word-final obstruents are devoiced; however, they assimilate voicing of the following consonant, e.g. cuc de seda [ˈkuɡ‿də ˈsɛðə] (C) / [ˈkuɡ‿de ˈsɛðɐ] (NW) ('silkworm'). In regular and fast speech, stops often assimilate the place of articulation of the following consonant producing phonetic gemination: tot bé [ˈtod‿ˈbe] → [ˈtob‿ˈbe] ('all good').

The voiceless sibilant fricatives and affricates /s/, /t͡s/, /ʃ/, /t͡ʃ/ (and, according to some sources, the voiceless labiodental fricative /f/) become voiced when they occur at the end of a word and are followed by a word beginning with a vowel (e.g. els [əɫs] (C) / [eɫs] (NW) 'the', but els avis [əɫz‿ˈäβis] (C) / [eɫz‿ˈäβis] (NW) 'the grandparents'; ets [ˈets] (C / NW) 'you are', but ets aquí [ˈedz‿əˈki] (C) / [ˈedz‿ɐˈki] (NW) 'you are here'; baix [ˈbaʃ] (C) / [ˈbajʃ] (NW) 'short', 'low', but Baix Ebre [ˈbaʒ‿ˈeβɾə] (C) / [ˈbajʒ‿ˈeβɾe] (NW) 'Baix Ebre'; vaig [ˈbat͡ʃ] (C / NW) 'I go', but vaig allà [ˈbad͡ʒ əˈʎa] (C) / [ˈbad͡ʒ ɐˈʎa] (NW) 'I go there').

The sibilant /s/ may be elided before /ʒ ~ dʒ/; e.g., els genets [əɫ.ʒəˈnɛt͡s] (C) / [eɫ.d͡ʒeˈnet͡s] (NW) ('the [horse] riders') Furthermore, when the term aquest ('this') is a pronoun, as in és aquest ('it's this one') it may be pronounced as [ˈez əˈkɛt] (with a silent ⟨s⟩), especially in Catalonia. In formal registers, it is recommended that the ⟨s⟩ of the adjective is pronounced when the following word starts with a vowel, especially if it stressed, like in aquest any [əˈkɛst‿ˈaɲ] ('this year') or aquest home [əˈkɛst‿ˈɔmə] ('this man'). The /s/ from the feminine aquesta should not be elided in any instance.

The pronunciation of /ɲs/ at the end of words (e.g., arenys 'a sandy place', anys 'years') is typically pronounced [ɲʃ]. If the word is followed by a voiced consonant or a vowel (e.g., Arenys de Mar 'Arenys de Mar', anys anteriors 'previous years'), it would theoretically be pronounced as /ɲz/, which would typically be pronounced [ɲʒ]. In some speakers the actual pronunciation would be an affricate ([ɲt͡ʃ] in the coda, and [ɲd͡ʒ] before a voiced consonant or a vowel). Also, among certain speakers of some variants (e.g., Valencian), the same occurs with /ʎs/ → [ʎʃ] (e.g., ells 'they', valls 'valleys'), which may also vary with an affricate [ʎt͡ʃ] and assimilate voicing /ʎz/ → [ʎʒ] or [ʎd͡ʒ] (e.g., ells estan 'they are', les Valls de la Marina Alta 'the Valleys of Marina Alta').

== Further dialectal variation ==
The differences in the vocalic systems is the main criteria used to differentiate between the major dialects: Wheeler distinguishes two major dialect groups, western and eastern dialects. Eastern Catalan includes Northern Catalan, Central Catalan, Balearic, and Algherese. Western dialects include Valencian and North-Western Catalan.

Regarding consonants, betacism, fortition, certain elisions, and fricative–affricate alternations are the most prominent differences between dialects.

== Historical development ==
Catalan shares features with neighboring Romance languages (Occitan, Italian, Sardinian, French, Spanish).

- Marked contrast of the vowel pairs /ɛ/ ~ /e/ and /ɔ/ ~ /o/, as in other Western Romance languages, except Spanish and Sardinian.
- Lenition of voiced stops /b/ → [β], /d/ → [ð], /ɡ/ → [ɣ] as in Galician and Spanish.
- Lack of diphthongization of Latin short ĕ, ŏ, as in Galician, Sardinian and Portuguese, and unlike French, Spanish and Italian.
- Abundance of diphthongs containing /w/, as in Galician and Portuguese.
- Abundance of /ʎ/ and /ɲ/ occurring at the end of words, as for instance moll ('wet') and any ('year'), unlike Spanish, Portuguese or Italian.

In contrast with many other Romance languages, Catalan has many monosyllabic words; and those ending in a wide variety of consonants and some consonant clusters. Also, Catalan has final-obstruent devoicing, thus featuring many couplets like amic ('male friend') vs. amiga ('female friend').

== Phonological sample ==
Universal Declaration of Human Rights, Article 1
Original	Tots els éssers humans neixen/naixen lliures i iguals en dignitat i en drets. Són dotats de raó i de consciència, i han de comportar-se fraternalment els uns amb els altres.
Central (Eastern Catalan)	/ˈtodz‿əlz‿ˈesəɾz‿uˈmanz‿ˈneʃən ˈʎiu̯ɾəz‿iːˈɣwalz‿ən diɡniˈtat i̯‿ən ˈdɾɛts ‖ son duˈtadz‿də rəˈo‿i̯ də kunsiˈɛnsiə | i̯‿an də kumpuɾˈtaɾsə fɾətəɾˌnalˈment‿əlz‿ˈunz‿əmb‿əlz‿altɾəs/
Valencian (Western Catalan)	/ˈtodz‿elz‿ˈeseɾz‿uˈmanz‿ˈnajʃen ˈʎiu̯ɾez‿iːˈɣwalz‿en diɡniˈtat i̯‿en ˈdɾets ‖ son doˈtadz‿de raˈo‿i̯ de konsiˈɛnsia | i̯‿an de kompoɾˈtaɾse fɾateɾˌnalˈment‿elz‿ˈunz‿amb‿elz‿altɾes/

== See also ==
- Catalan dialects and varieties (Dialectal variation in Catalan phonology)
  - Algherese § Phonology
  - Balearic § Phonology
  - Valencian § Phonology
- Occitan phonology
- Index of phonetics articles

== Bibliography ==
- Badia Cardús, Montserrat (1992–1993), "El problema filològic del caràcter fonològic o no dels sons africats [ts], [dz], [TS] i [DZ]" (PDF), Llengua i Literatura (in Catalan), 5, Institut d'Estudis Catalans
- Badia i Margarit, Antoni Maria (1988), Sons i fonemes de la llengua catalana (in Catalan), Barcelona: Universitat de Barcelona, ISBN 84-7528-500-7
- Bech, Sebastià, Apunts de fonètica catalana (PDF) (in Catalan)
- Beltran, Vicent (2000), El parlar de la Marina Alta: El contacte interdialectal valencianobalear (in Valencian), Valencia: Departament de Filologia Catalana. Universitat d'Alacant
- Beltran, Vicent (2008), El parlar de les Valls del Vinalopó i del Carxe (in Valencian), Petrer, Alicante: Centre d'Estudis Locals del Vinalopó
- Bonet Alsina, Eulàlia; Mascaró Altimiras, Joan (1997), "On the representation of contrasting rhotics", in Martínez Gil, Fernando; Morales Front, Alfonso (eds.), Issues in the Phonology and Morphology of the Major Iberian Languages, Washington, DC: Georgetown University Press, pp. 103–126, ISBN 978-0-87840-647-0, LCCN 96-47798
- Bonet Alsina, Eulàlia; Lloret-Romanyach, Maria-Rosa; Mascaró Altimiras, Joan (2007), Domain and directionality in Catalan ATR harmony
- Bosch i Roura, Eva (2017), "Les vocals mitjanes posteriors en el català de Girona: anàlisi de la producció i de la percepció", dialnet.unirioja.es
- Burzio, Luigi (1988), English stress. Certamen Phonologicum. Papers from the 1987 Cortona Phonology Meeting.
- Cabré Castellví, Maria Teresa (2009), "Vowel reduction and vowel harmony in Eastern Catalan loanword phonology", in Vigário, Marina; Frota, Sónia; Freitas, M. João (eds.), Phonetics and Phonology: Interactions and interrelations, Current Issues in Linguistic Theory, vol. 306, John Benjamins, pp. 267–286, doi:10.1075/cilt.306.13cab, ISBN 978-90-272-4822-0
- Carbonell Costa, Joan F.; Llisterri Boix, Joaquim (1992), "Catalan", Journal of the International Phonetic Association, 22 (1–2), International Phonetic Association & Cambridge University Press: 53–56, doi:10.1017/S0025100300004618, S2CID 249411809
- Carbonell Costa, Joan F.; Llisterri Boix, Joaquim (1999), "Catalan", Handbook of the International Phonetic Association: A Guide to the Usage of the International Phonetic Alphabet, Cambridge, UK: Cambridge University Press, pp. 61–65, ISBN 978-0-521-63751-0
- Carrera Sabaté, Josefina; Pons Moll, Clàudia; Solà Cortassa, Joan (2014), Els sons del català (in Catalan), Universitat Autonòmica de Barcelona
- Coromines, Joan (1976), Lleures i converses d'un filòleg (in Catalan), Club Editor
- Dols, Nicolau; Wheeler, Max (1995), El consonantisme final del mallorquí i el «llicenciament d'obertures» (in Catalan)
- Fabra Poch, Pompeu (2006) [1933], Gramàtica catalana (PDF) (in Catalan) (7th, facsimile ed.), Barcelona: Institut d'Estudis Catalans, ISBN 978-84-7283-290-9
- Francesc Ballone (2016), Sobre la Correcta Interpretació dels Fonemes Vocàlics en Alguerés: un Estudi Acústic (in Catalan)
- Ferrater Soler, Gabriel; et al. (1977) [1973], "Català", Gran Enciclopèdia Catalana [Great Catalan Encyclopaedia] (in Catalan), vol. 4 (corrected ed.), Barcelona: Enciclopèdia Catalana, pp. 628–639, ISBN 84-85-194-04-7
- Grandgent, Charles Hall (2001) [1st pub. 1907], "Phonology", An Introduction to Vulgar Latin, Heath's modern language series, D.C. Heath & Co., pp. 60–143, ISBN 978-1-4021-6201-5
- Hall, Jacqueline (2001), Convivència in Catalonia: Languages Living Together (in Catalan), Barcelona: Fundació Jaume Bofill
- Harrison, Phil (1997), Backley, Phillip; Harris, John (eds.), "The Relative Complexity of Catalan Vowels and Their Perceptual Correlates" (PDF), UCL Working Papers in Linguistics, 9, University College London
- Herrero, Ricard (2022), Variació i estabilitat en el sistema vocàlic del valencià: anàlisi acústica de l'harmonia vocàlica (in Valencian), Valencia: Universitat de València
- Herrero, Ricard (2025), "Els fenòmens de color de la vocal A final en l'establiment i la difusió de l'estàndard oral català", Revista de Lingüística y Lenguas Aplicadas, 20, doi:10.4995/rlyla.2025.22366
- Herrick, Dylan (February 2000), "Catalan phonology: Cluster simplification and nasal place assimilation. Linguistic Symposium on Romance Languages", in Wiltshire, Caroline R.; Camps, Joaquim (eds.), Romance Phonology and Variation: Selected papers from the 30th Linguistic Symposium on Romance Languages, Current Issues in Linguistic Theory, vol. 217, Gainesville, FL: John Benjamins, pp. 69–83, doi:10.1075/cilt.217.08her, ISBN 9781588110794
- Hualde, José Ignacio (1992), Catalan, Descriptive Grammars, Routledge, doi:10.4324/9780203411766, ISBN 978-0-415-05498-0
- Jiménez, Jesús; Lloret-Romanyach, Maria-Rosa (2009), Harmonia vocàlica: Paràmetres i variació (PDF) (in Catalan)
- Kaye, Jonathan (1990), 'Coda' licensing, Phonology 7
- Kenstowicz, Michael (1994), Phonology in Generative Grammar, Oxford: Blackwell
- Lacreu Cuesta, Josep (2002), Manual d'ús de l'estàndard oral (in Valencian) (6th ed.), Valencia: Universitat de València, ISBN 978-84-370-5390-5
- Lleó Pujol, Concepció (1970), Problems of Catalan Phonology, Studies in Linguistics and Language Learning, vol. 8, Seattle, WA: University of Washington
- Lloret-Romanyach, Maria Rosa (April 2003), "The Phonological Role of Paradigms", in Auger, Julie; Clements, J.Clancy; Vance, Barbara (eds.), The Phonological Role of Paradigms: The case of insular Catalan. Contemporary Approaches to Romance Linguistics: Selected Papers from the 33rd Linguistic Symposium on Romance Languages, Current Issues in Linguistic Theory, vol. 258, Bloomington, IN: John Benjamins, pp. 275–297, doi:10.1075/cilt.258.15llo, ISBN 9781588115980
- Mascaró Altimiras, Joan (1976), Catalan Phonology and the Phonological Cycle (PhD), Massachusetts Institute of Technology, hdl:1721.1/7582, OCLC 03491250
- Mascaró Altimiras, Joan (1986), "Studies in compensatory lengthening", Compensatory diphthongization in Majorcan Catalan, Dordrecht: Foris
- Mascaró Altimiras, Joan (1987), "Studies in Romance languages", Syllable-final processes in Catalan, Dordrecht: Foris, pp. 163–180
- Mascaró Altimiras, Joan (2001), "Compensatory diphthongization in Majorcan Catalan", in Kreidler, Charles W. (ed.), Phonology: Critical Concepts in Linguistics, vol. 3, Routledge, pp. 574–587, ISBN 0415203473
- Montoya, Brauli (1989), La interferència lingüística al sud valencià (in Valencian), Valencia: Generalitat Valenciana
- Morales, Alfonso, Height Harmony in Tortosí Catalan, Washington D.C.: Georgetown University
- Padgett, Jaye (2009), "Systemic Contrast and Catalan Rhotics", The Linguistic Review, 26 (4), Mouton de Gruyter: 431, doi:10.1515/tlir.2009.016, S2CID 15197551
- Pons-Moll, Clàudia, Estratègies en l'adaptació de manlleus en català i en altres llengües romàniques (PDF) (in Catalan), Universitat de Barcelona
- Rafel Fontanals, Joaquim (1981), "La lengua catalana fronteriza en el Bajo Aragón Meridional: estudio fonológico", Memorias de la Real Academia de Buenas Letras de Barcelona (in Spanish), vol. 20, Reial Acadèmia de Bones Lletres de Barcelona
- Institut d'Estudis Catalans (1999), Rafel Fontanals, Joaquim (ed.), Aplicació al català dels principis de transcripció de l'Associació Fonètica Internacional (PDF) (in Catalan) (2nd ed.), Barcelona, Spain: Institut d'Estudis Catalans, Secció Filològica, ISBN 84-7283-446-8
- Institut d'Estudis Catalans (2009), "I.5 Els diftongs, els triftongs i els hiats", Gramàtica de la llengua catalana (PDF) (in Catalan) (Provisional draft ed.), archived from the original (PDF) on 14 January 2016
- Recasens Vives, Daniel, Timing in Catalan, Barcelona: Institut d'Estudis Catalans
- Recasens Vives, Daniel (1986), Estudis de fonètica experimental del català oriental central [Experimental phonetics studies of Central Eastern Catalan], Biblioteca Milà i Fontanals (in Catalan), vol. 6, L'Abadia de Montserrat
- Recasens Vives, Daniel (1993), Fonètica i Fonologia, Biblioteca Universitària (in Catalan), Enciclopèdia Catalana
- Recasens Vives, Daniel; Fontdevila, Jordi; Pallarès Ramon, Maria Dolors (1995), "Velarization degree and coarticulatory resistance for /l/ in Catalan and German" (PDF), Journal of Phonetics, 23 (1): 37–52, doi:10.1016/S0095-4470(95)80031-X
- Recasens Vives, Daniel (1996) [1991], Fonètica descriptiva del català: assaig de caracterització de la pronúncia del vocalisme i el consonantisme català al segle XX, Biblioteca Filològica (in Catalan), vol. 21 (2nd ed.), Barcelona, Spain: Institut d'Estudis Catalans, ISBN 978-84-7283-312-8
- Recasens Vives, Daniel; Pallarès Ramon, Maria Dolors (2001), "Coarticulation, assimilation and blending in Catalan consonant clusters" (PDF), Journal of Phonetics, 29 (3), Elsevier: 273–301, doi:10.1006/jpho.2001.0139
- Recasens Vives, Daniel; Espinosa, Aina (2005), "Articulatory, positional and coarticulatory characteristics for clear /l/ and dark /l/: evidence from two Catalan dialects" (PDF), Journal of the International Phonetic Association, 35 (1): 1–25, doi:10.1017/S0025100305001878, S2CID 14140079
- Recasens Vives, Daniel; Espinosa, Aina (2007), "An Electropalatographic and Acoustic Study of Affricates and Fricatives in Two Catalan Dialects" (PDF), Journal of the International Phonetic Association, 37 (2): 143–172, doi:10.1017/S0025100306002829, S2CID 14275190
- Recasens Vives, Daniel; Mira Permanyer, Meritxell (2015), "Place and manner assimilation in Catalan consonant clusters" (PDF), Journal of the International Phonetic Association, 45 (2): 115–147, doi:10.1017/S0025100315000080, S2CID 146535508
- Saborit Vilar, Josep (2009), Millorem la pronúncia [Let's improve the pronunciation], Recerca (in Valencian), vol. 11, Acadèmia Valenciana de la Llengua
- Segura, Carles (1996), Estudi lingüístic del parlar d'Alacant (in Valencian), Alicante: Institut d'Estudis Juan Gil-Albert, Generalitat Valenciana
- Valls, Esteve (2018), "El lleidatà, un parlar en recessió: aspectes fonètics i fonològics", Shikar, 5, Racó
- Veny Clar, Joan (1978), Estudis de geolingüística catalana [Studies on Catalan geolinguistics] (in Catalan), Barcelona, Spain: Grup 62, ISBN 84-297-1430-8
- Veny Clar, Joan (1982) [1978], Els parlars catalans. (Síntesi de dialectologia catalana) (in Catalan), Palma, Spain: Editorial Moll
- Veny Clar, Joan (1989), Els parlars catalans. Síntesi de dialectologia, Biblioteca «Raixa» (in Catalan), vol. 128 (8th ed.), Palma, Spain: Editorial Moll, ISBN 978-84-273-1038-4
- Veny Clar, Joan (2006), Contacte i constrast de llengües i dialectes [Contact and contrast of languages and dialects], Biblioteca Lingüística Catalana (in Valencian), vol. 30, Valencia, Spain: Universitat de València, ISBN 84-370-6300-0
- Veny Clar, Joan (2007), Petit Atles lingüístic del domini català (in Catalan), vol. 1 & 2, Barcelona, Spain: Institut d'Estudis Catalans, ISBN 978-84-7283-942-7
- Walker, Rachel (2005), Weak Triggers in Vowel Harmony, Natural Language and Linguistic Theory, vol. 23, pp. 917–989
- Wheeler, Max W. (1979), Phonology of Catalan, Publications of the Philological Society, vol. 28, Oxford, UK: Blackwell, ISBN 978-0-631-11621-9
- Wheeler, Max W. (2005), The Phonology of Catalan, The Phonology of the World's Languages, Oxford, UK: Oxford University Press, ISBN 978-0-19-925814-7
- Wheeler, Max; Yates, Alan; Dols Salas, Nicolau (1999), Catalan: A Comprehensive Grammar, Routledge Comprehensive Grammars, London: Routledge, doi:10.4324/9780203028506, ISBN 978-0-415-10342-8

Others

- L'estàndard oral valencià (PDF) (in Valencian), Valencia: Acadèmia Valenciana de la Llengua, archived from the original (PDF) on 30 September 2010
- Gramàtica de la llengua catalana (PDF) (in Catalan), Barcelona: Institut d'Estudis Catalans
- Ortografia catalana (PDF) (in Catalan), Barcelona: Institut d'Estudis Catalans, 2017, ISBN 9788499653563
- Proposta per a un estàndard oral de la llengua catalana (PDF) (in Catalan), Institut d'Estudis Catalans, 1990
