= Max Wheeler =

Max Wheeler may refer to:

- Max Wheeler (footballer)
- Max Wheeler (linguist)
