= Alicante Valencian =

Dialect of Valencian

- Lower Southern Valencian
- valencià alacantí
- Native to: Spain
- Region: Southern and central areas of the province of Alicante (Note: Which includes Alacantí, Valleys of the Vinalopó, south of Alcoià, and Guardamar, in Lower Segura.) and an inland subregion in Murcia (Note: Which includes Carche.)
- Language family: Indo-European: Italic; Latino-Faliscan; Latin; Romance; Italo-Western; Western Romance; Gallo-Romance (Note: Also classified as Iberian Romance.); Occitano-Romance; Catalan; Western Catalan; Valencian; Southern Valencian; Alicante Valencian
- Early forms: Old Latin: Vulgar Latin; Old Occitan; Old Catalan
- Writing system: Latin script (Valencian alphabet)

Language codes
- ISO 639-3: –
- Glottolog: None
- Dialects of Valencian, including Alicante

Alicante Valencian (Valencian: valencià alacantí, or simply alacantí) is a subdialect of Valencian spoken in the south of the Valencian Community (province of Alicante); specifically in Alacantí, the Valleys of Vinalopó and in the historic subregions of Foia de Castalla, in the south of Alcoià, and Carche (El Carxe), in the Region of Murcia. Furthermore, Alicante Valencian is also spoken in Guardamar, the only Valencian-speaking town in the Lower Segura region.

During the 19th century and mid 20th century, the magazine El Tio Cuc used the term alacantí, in the archaic form alicantí, as a glottonym for the language spoken in the city.

It is known for the use of lexical Castilianisms such as astò (< esto, this) and syntactic ones such as ha hi (< hay, there is), for archaisms such as naxtre (< nàixer or néixer, to be born) and the dropping of the intervocalic -d- in words such as caïra (< cadira, chair).

== Classification ==
In most dialectology treatises, such as the division advocated by Joan Veny i Clar and the Institute for Catalan Studies or that of Jordi Colomina, it is considered a subvariant or subdialect of Southern Valencian. Some, such as the Catalan-Valencian professors at the University of Alicante Carles Segura and Brauli Montoya Abat, defend that it is a variety of equal rank to Southern or Central Valencian.

== Geographical extension ==
The southern and western border is that of Valencian with respect to Spanish: the Segura and Vinalopó rivers. To the east, it borders the Mediterranean Sea.

The northern limit with Southern Valencian is diffuse, since it depends on the differential feature or isogloss that is considered. In general terms, it encompasses the territory south of the Biar-Busot line, a term that describes the border with Castile established in the Treaty of Almizra of 1244. Therefore, it is the product of the repopulation of the north of the Kingdom of Murcia after its conquest in 1265-1266 and definitive incorporation into the Kingdom of Valencia in 1304-1305. This territory, which Manuel Sanchis i Guarner stated remained outside Muslim rule for a time as an autonomous state under Theodemir of Orihuela, became part of an administrative division called the Governorate of Orihuela. According to the Valencian Linguistic Atlas, the last towns to speak Alicante Valencian would be La Canyada, Biar, Tibi, Xixona, Busot, Aigües and El Campello.

== Historical regression ==
Historically, Valencian, in the form of Valencian Alicante, covered the entire Vinalopó valley (except Villena and Sax) and the Vega Baja del Segura (in Valencian: Baix Segura), areas that have largely become Spanish-speaking. This regression led to the disappearance of the language in the Vega Baja del Segura, except for Guardamar del Segura, and the emergence of the Spanish-speaking islets of Elda and Aspe-Monforte del Cid.

The use of Spanish in these populations was traditionally attributed to a divergence in the origin of the settlers after the conquest of the 13th century, but modernly it is postulated that it is due to a more recent repopulation, after the Expulsion of the Moriscos in 1609; this thesis is reinforced by the documentation that Valencian was spoken in Orihuela until the 16th century and Spanish from at least the 18th century. In this way, while many border towns became Spanish-speaking, others became Valencian-speaking definitively (Crevillent, Petrer).

On the contrary, Villena and Sax were part of Castile until the advent of the province of Alicante in 1836 and, therefore, have never been Valencian-speaking.

== Modern regression ==
The growth of the more Spanish-speaking cities (Alicante, (Note: Although officially Valencian-speaking, Alicante has become more Spanish-speaking, a trend from the 20th and 21st centuries.) Elda, Orihuela), over the still Valencian-speaking populations (Petrer, Santa Pola, Guardamar) throughout the 20th century creates an unequal demographic dynamic between the two languages, similar to what happens in the rest of the Valencian-speaking territory.

Alicante Valencian is the dialect with the lowest number of speakers who identify it as their first language (0-20%; in the Central regions it is 41-50%). It is also one of the few regions where the trend is negative. This trend towards linguistic extinction seems to be confirmed by Colomina, who in 1985 could not find Valencian speakers aged 20-30 in the city of Alicante.

On the contrary, the 2015 Enquesta d'ús i coneixement del valencià, which includes Marina Baixa but excludes the Spanish-speaking municipalities, found that 44% can speak it and 66% understand it (compared to 56% and 77% in all Valencian-speaking regions). However, 10% use it generally or always at home and 5% with strangers (compared to 29% and 17% in the entire Valencian-speaking territory).

Along with the northern Valencian regions, it is the region that has the least trust or respect for Valencian: 17% believe that it should be used less, against 35% who would like it to be used more.

== General characteristics ==
=== Morphosyntax ===
- As in the Southern Valencian, the plural article, both masculine and feminine, becomes es before words beginning with a consonant: es bous and es vaques; but takes the forms els, les before words beginning with a vowel: els alacantins and les alacantines.
- Weak pronouns remain full, as in much of the Valencian Community.
- Castilianisation of the weak pronoun li (di-li-ho) per se (di-se-ho). This feature appears only in the young population of Valencian-speaking localities that emigrate to large populations where Spanish is mostly spoken. For example, a young person from Xixona who resides in Alicante.

=== Phonetics ===
- Absorption of the i [j] (yod) in the suffix -ix-: [ˈkäʃɐ] (caixa, box). A feature shared with Safor and Marina Alta.
- Shift from the diphthong /ɔw/ [ɒw] (phonetically [ɒ̝w]) to [ɑw] (phon. [ɑ̝w]): [ˈbɑ̝w] (bou, ox), [ˈɑ̝w] (ou, egg), [ˈpɑ̝w] (pou, well).
- The dropping of the intervocalic -d- present in the whole of Valencian (cridà per cridada, call) extends to the suffix -uda: grenyua (grenyuda, dishevelled), vençua (vençuda, expired). Arbitrarily the same happens with other words: roa (roda, wheel), caïra (cadira, chair), poer (poder, power), cony (codony, quince), puent (pudent, smelly). In Baix Vinalopó, Novelda and Guardamar, almost all intervocalic -d- is elided, while it is uncommon in the north of the dialect (Torre de les Maçanes, Alt Vinalopó, Pinós). It is one of the most defining features of Alicante Valencian according to Sanchis Guarner and Colomina. Notably, it is a phenomenon that reappears in the Spanish of Villena.
- The dropping of the intervocalic -s- in words ending in -esa: vellea (vellesa, old age), fortalea (fortalesa, fortress), riquea (riquesa, wealth), a phenomenon that is shared with general Valencian. The norms of the Acadèmia Valenciana de la Llengua accept these forms in its grammar and its normative dictionary, together with those ending in -esa.
- The final -r is very often elided, flo (flor, flower), se (ser, to be), dormí (dormir, sleep), similar to what happens in Catalan as a whole but not in the area between Castelló de la Plana and Alcoi. The predominant theory is that the loss of -r would occur beyond the 15th century in harmony with the Catalan higher up in Castellón, but that it would not have been consolidated in the Vinalopó Mitjà until the 19th century (Sanchis Guarner, Badia, Giner, Colomina); only Griera (1933) disagrees, who argues that the final -r in Central and Southern Valencian is an innovation and that, therefore, the elision of final -r in Alicante would be a case of linguistic conservatism.
- As in Castellón Valencian and Tortosan Valencian, there is a palatalisation of the tz: setze [ˈsed͡zë] > [ˈsed͡ːʒë] (sixteen), but unlike in other dialects, when this palatalisation occurs, there is a gemination that makes setze [ˈsed͡ːʒë], distinguishable from setge [ˈsed͡ʒë] (seize).
- As in Southern Valencian (and especially in Marina Alta, Safor, Costera, Vall d'Albaida and south of Ribera), there is vowel harmony with final -a when the preceding syllable has an open vowel. There are two types of harmony:
  - [-ɔ̈] (phon. [ɒ̝̈]) when there is [ɔ] (phon. [ɒ̝]): dona /ˈdɔnɔ/ [ˈdɒ̝nɒ̝̈] (woman).
  - [-ɛ̈] (phon. [æ̈]) when there is [ɛ] (phon. [æ]): terra /ˈtɛrɛ/ [ˈtæræ̈] (Earth, land).

=== Lexicon ===
- The use of the adverb of place aquí (instead of the general Valencian ací) for the first degree of distance and there is the demonstrative astò which has replaced the general and normative açò.
- There is a fairly high degree of Castilianisms, more than the rest of the subdialects, and especially outside the Camp d'Alacant (that is, the area closest to Castile): ha hi for hi ha (Spanish hay, there is), havia for hi havia (Spanish había, there was), llimpiar for llavar (netejar, clean), sacar for traure (in Guardamar, Agost and Baix and Mitjà Vinalopó), llevar for portar (to carry), assul for blau (blue) (but not in Crevillent, Santa Pola and Guardamar), niebla for boira (fog), mueble for moble (furniture), mantxa for taca (stain), etc. Most of which are 19th century innovations, according to Colomina.
- Contrary to these Castilianisms, in the Vinalopó valley (including Elche, Crevillent, Guardamar and Santa Pola) the adverbs abans, ans and denans are preserved, replaced in the rest of Valencian by the Castilianism antes. The adverb dintre alternating with dins (in, inside) is also preserved, as is the classic preposition devers (towards) articulated [dëˈves].

== See also ==
- Northern Valencian
- Central Valencian (Apitxat Valencian)
- Southern Valencian
