= Southern Valencian =

Dialect of Valencian

- valencià meridional
- Native to: Spain
- Region: Southern Valencian Community, and Carche (Region of Murcia)
- Language family: Indo-European: Italic; Latino-Faliscan; Latin; Romance; Italo-Western; Western Romance; Gallo-Romance (Note: Also classified as Iberian Romance.); Occitano-Romance; Catalan; Western Catalan; Valencian; Southern Valencian
- Early forms: Old Latin: Vulgar Latin; Old Occitan; Old Catalan
- Dialects: Upper Southern Valencian (Note: Also termed Northern Southern Valencian.); Lower Southern Valencian (or Alacantí Valencian) (Note: Also termed Southern Southern Valencian.)
- Writing system: Latin script (Valencian alphabet)

Language codes
- ISO 639-3: –
- Glottolog: vale1255
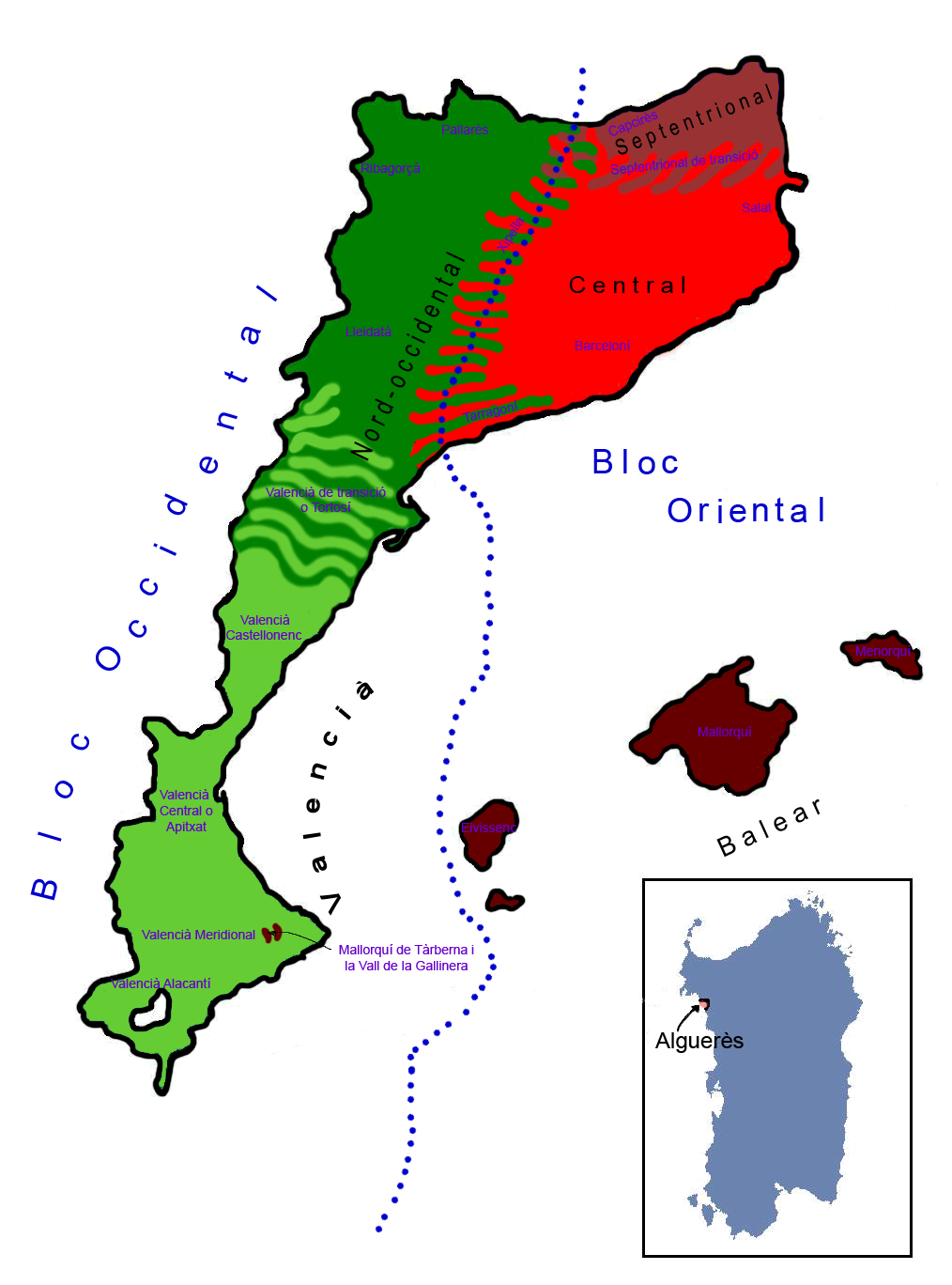
- Dialects of Valencian, including Southern Valencian.

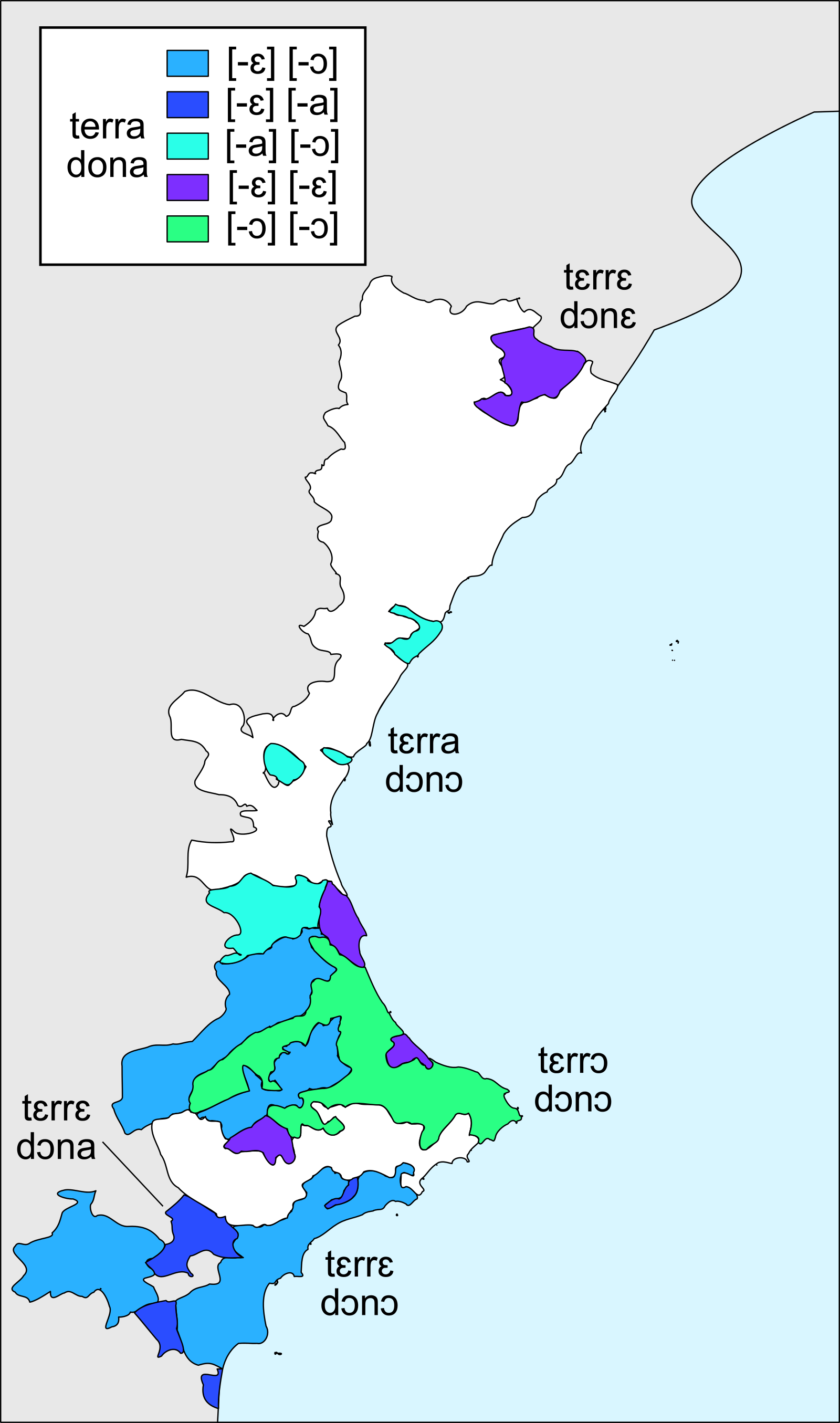
- Presence of vowel harmony in Valencian.

Southern Valencian (valencià meridional) is a dialect of Valencian spoken in the south of the Valencian Community. It comprises two sub-varieties, Northern or Upper Southern Valencian (also known as proper Southern Valencian), and Southern or Lower Southern Valencian (traditionally known as Alacantí Valencian).

Southern Valencian is known for the presence of different types of vowel harmony.

== Sub-varieties ==
=== Upper Southern Valencian ===
The variety of Upper Southern Valencian or Northern Southern (also ambiguously known as Southern Valencian) includes all the comarques south of the Xúquer river, up to the line that joins the town of Biar with Busot. This dialectal zone is also known as General Valencian.

Within the area of Upper Southern Valencian, there are further subareas:

- The inland zone (the comarques of Costera, Vall d'Albaida, Comtat, and Alcoià) has the following phonological and morphological features:
  - Final stops are elided after nasals and liquids (camp [ˈkäm] 'field', cent [ˈsen̪] 'hundred', molt [ˈmoɫ̪] 'very'); or the falling diphthong /uj/ in cuit ('boiled') and buit ('empty').
  - The weak pronoun es (or se) is used instead of mos ('we') and vos ('you') in reflexive functions, like Central Valencian: es rentem, es renteu instead of mos rentem, vos renteu ('we clean ourselves', 'you clean yourselves').
- The coastal zone (the comarques of Safor and Marina Alta) has the following phonological and morphological features:
  - Final /a/ backs to [ɒ] (phonetically [ɒ̝̈]) (xica > xic[ɒ̝̈] 'girl') and final stops in clusters are pronounced camp [ˈkämp], cent [ˈsen̪t], molt [ˈmoɫ̪t].
  - [j] becomes silent in caixa ('box') and peix ('fish'), and it is used in the diphthong /wi/ in cuit ('boiled') and buit ('empty')
  - Substitution of mos and vos for es is less frequent, especially in the case of mos: mos volem 'we want us', mo(s) n'anem (often simplified to mone) 'we're leaving' (inland zone: es/se volem, se n'anem).
- Some features of Majorcan influence in Marina Alta and Tàrbena (Marina Baixa) are:
  - Final /ɾ/ is unstable at points of the region: it is elided in Bolulla and Pedreguer, and is unstable in Dénia and Xàbia.
  - Elision of /j/ in the digraph ⟨ix⟩: caixa > caxa [ˈkäʃɐ], peix > pex [ˈpeʃ]. This elision also exists in the neighbouring region of Safor (except in Gandia).
  - Differentiated articulation of ⟨j-g⟩ and ⟨tj-tg⟩ between vowels: the affricated geminated sound of ⟨-tj-⟩/⟨-tg-⟩, /d͡ːʒ/, as opposed to the simple affricate of ⟨-j-⟩/⟨-g-⟩, /d͡ʒ/. This is still active in some villages of Marina Alta (Benissa, Senija, Xaló, Teulada, etc.). In addition to this, two villages (Benissa and Senija) feature the deaffrication of ⟨-j-⟩/⟨-g-⟩ ([ʒ]), like in Majorcan and Northern Valencian.
  - Apheresis of initial ⟨a⟩: nar [ˈnɑ(ɾ)] instead of anar ('to go'), ribar [rɪˈbɑ(ɾ)] instead of arribar ('to arrive').
  - Pronunciation of unstressed /a/ followed by stressed /i/ as [ə]: raïm [rəˈim] ('grape'), matí [məˈti] ('morning'). Final /a/ is close to [ə] in Benissa, Gata and Pedreguer: xica [ˈt͡ʃikə] ('girl'), mosca [ˈmoskə] ('fly').
  - Vowel /ɛ/ (phonetically [æ]) in fred [ˈfɾet] → [ˈfɾæt] ('cold') and primer [pɾɪˈme(ɾ)] → [pɾɪˈmæ(ɾ)] ('first').
  - Move from tonic /a/ ([ɑ]) to [ɛ] (phon. [æ]), traure [ˈtɾɑwɾë] → [ˈtɾæwɾë] ('take out'), maula [ˈmɑwɫɐ] → [ˈmæwɫæ̈] ('trap, trick').
  - Raising of unstressed /a/ > [ë] ([e] in stressed position) in nedar [nëˈðɑ(ɾ)] ('to swim') and by extension in nede [ˈneðë] ('I swim'), nedes [ˈneðës] ('you swim'), etc.
  - Alternation between the unstressed sounds [a] (phon. [ɐ]) and [e] (phon. [ë]), resembling the Majorcan mid central vowel [ə]: devant [dëˈvan̪t] (davant) 'in front', d'ecí [dëˈsi] (d'ací) 'from here', caregol [kɐɾëˈɣɒ̝ɫ] (caragol) 'snail', llevor [ʎëˈvo̞(ɾ)] (llavor) 'seed', al gos [ɐɫ̪ ˈɣos] (el gos) 'the dog', as diu [ɐz ˈðiw] (es diu) 'he/she's called', famella [fɐˈmeʎɐ] (femella) 'female', etc.
  - Remains of the insularic consonantal assimilations: etzamen [ëˈd͡ːzämën] (examen) 'exam', catsot [kɐˈt͡ːsɒ̝t] (capsot) 'big headed', datsa [ˈdät͡ːsɐ] (dacsa) 'corn', dissatte [dɪˈsätːë] (dissabte) 'Saturday', etc.

=== Lower Southern Valencian ===
Lower Southern Valencian or Southern Southern Valencian. This dialect is frequently called Alacantí Valencian (valencià alacantí) by some manuals of dialectology. To avoid confusion between the different dialectal realities of the comarques of this provincial demarcation, it is best using the term Southern or Lower Southern to describe the speeches that extend to the south of the line that links the settlements of Biar and Busot, that includes the south of Alcoià (Foia de Castalla), Alacantí and the valleys of the river Vinalopó, and Carche (El Carxe).

Some distinctive features of this dialect are:

- /j/ becomes silent in faixa ('strip, girdle'), reixa ('grid') and mateix ('same') > faxa [ˈfäʃɐ], rexa [ˈreʃɐ] and matex [mɐˈteʃ] ; like in Safor and Marina Alta.
- Final /ɾ/ is maintained in the coastal regions, but similar to the Valencian spoken in Castellón de la Plana, it is elided when the verb is accompanied by enclitics (especially pronouns): saluda(r)-te ('to greet you'), endu(r)-se ('to take away'). In Elx, it is also elided in the plain verbs of the second conjugation: vénce(r) ('to win, to expire'), córre(r) ('run').
- The diphthong of cuina ('kitchen') is falling [uj], like in a large part of the Upper Southern Valencian dialect, and also in Catalonia and the islands.
- Intervocalic /d/ is elided in the suffixes -ada and -ador, and also in -uda: grenyu(d)a ('dishevelled'), panxu(d)a ('big-bellied'), etc. In Elx and Guardamar, almost every ⟨d⟩ between vowels is elided, also by syntactic phonetics: El Nal que ve anirem a la boa d'exa ona grenyua que viu al carre(r) (d)e la Roa (Standard Valencian: El Nadal que ve anirem a la boda d'eixa dona grenyuda que viu al carrer de la Roda) 'The following Christmas we will go to the wedding of that dishevelled woman who lives in the street of the Wheel'.
- The suffix -esa /eza/ is commonly reduced to [eɐ]: bellea [bëˈʎeɐ] ('beauty').

The region of the Vinalopó Valley and neighbouring areas form a dialectal zone within the Lower Southern dialect with the following phonological features:

- Final /ɾ/ elision: treballa(r) ('to work'), millo(r) ('better').
- Stops become silent in final clusters: camp [ˈkäm], cent [ˈsen̪], molt [ˈmoɫ̪].
- The diphthongs /ɔw/ → [ɒw] (phon. [ɒ̝w]) and /aw/ (phon. [ɒ̝w]) become homophones as [ɑ̝w] (transcribed as /aw/ for simplicity); e.g., ou ('egg') is pronounced the same as au [ˈɑ̝w] ('bird') and pou ('well') the same as pau [ˈpɑ̝w] ('peace').
- The diphthong ⟨ui⟩ [wi] in buit and cuit is rising like in general Valencian, and it is not falling ([uj]) like in the rest of the Lower Southern dialect.

The Lower Southern dialect has the following morphological features:

- The article is invariable for the masculine and the feminine: es vaques and es bous for les vaques and els bous.
- Ací is not present in the demonstrative system, there is only aquí (proximal), ahí (medial), and allà (distal). However, only aquí and allà are used by the most conservative speakers.
- The general demonstrative açò is replaced by astò, and the pronoun li is changed to se when pronouns are combined: se la donarem, dóna-se-la instead of li la donarem ('we will give it to her'), dóna-li-la ('give it to her').
- The full forms of the pronouns me, te, se, ne, mos, vos do never reduce, including in enclitic position: me pareix que ta tia se troba malalta, posa-te la jaqueta i anem a vore-la (em pareix que ta tia es troba malalta, posa't la jaqueta i anem a vore-la) 'It seems to me your aunt is sick, put yourself a jacket and let's go to see her'.
- In verbal morphology, the suffixes -am and -au from the imperative and subjunctive (digam, digau) have evolved to -em and -eu (diguem, digueu), except in Elx, where the original forms survive.

== See also ==
- Northern Valencian
- Central Valencian (Apitxat Valencian)

== Bibliography ==
- Beltran i Calvo, Vicent (2000), El parlar de la Marina Alta: El contacte interdialectal valencianobalear (in Valencian), Valencia: Departament de Filologia Catalana. Universitat d'Alacant
- Beltran i Calvo, Vicent (2005), El parlar de la Marina Alta: Microatles lingüístic de la Marina Alta (in Valencian), Valencia: Departament de Filologia Catalana. Universitat d'Alacant
- Beltran i Calvo, Vicent; Segura i Llopes, Carles (2018), Els parlars valencians (in Valencian) (2nd ed.), Valencia: Publicacions Universitat de València, ISBN 978-84-9134-240-3
- Colomina i Castanyer, Jordi (1991), El valencià de la Marina Baixa, Estudis del valencià actual (in Valencian), vol. 3, Valencia: Conselleria de Cultura, Educació i Ciència. Generalitat Valenciana, ISBN 9788478904983, OCLC 29297412
- Recasens i Vives, Daniel (1996) [1991], Fonètica descriptiva del català: assaig de caracterització de la pronúncia del vocalisme i el consonantisme català al segle XX, Biblioteca Filològica (in Catalan), vol. 21 (2nd ed.), Barcelona. Spain: Institut d'Estudis Catalans, ISBN 978-84-7283-312-8
- Sanchis i Guarner, Manuel (2005), La llengua dels valencians (in Valencian) (20 ed.), Valencia: Edicions 3 i 4, ISBN 84-7502-082-8
- Saborit i Vilar, Josep (2009), Millorem la pronúncia (in Valencian), Acadèmia Valenciana de la Llengua
- Veny i Clar, Joan (1983), Els parlars catalans (in Catalan), Palma: Moll, ISBN 9788427304222
