= Canelobre Cave =

Cave in the Valencian Community of Spain

Coordinates: 38°30′37″N 0°24′41″W

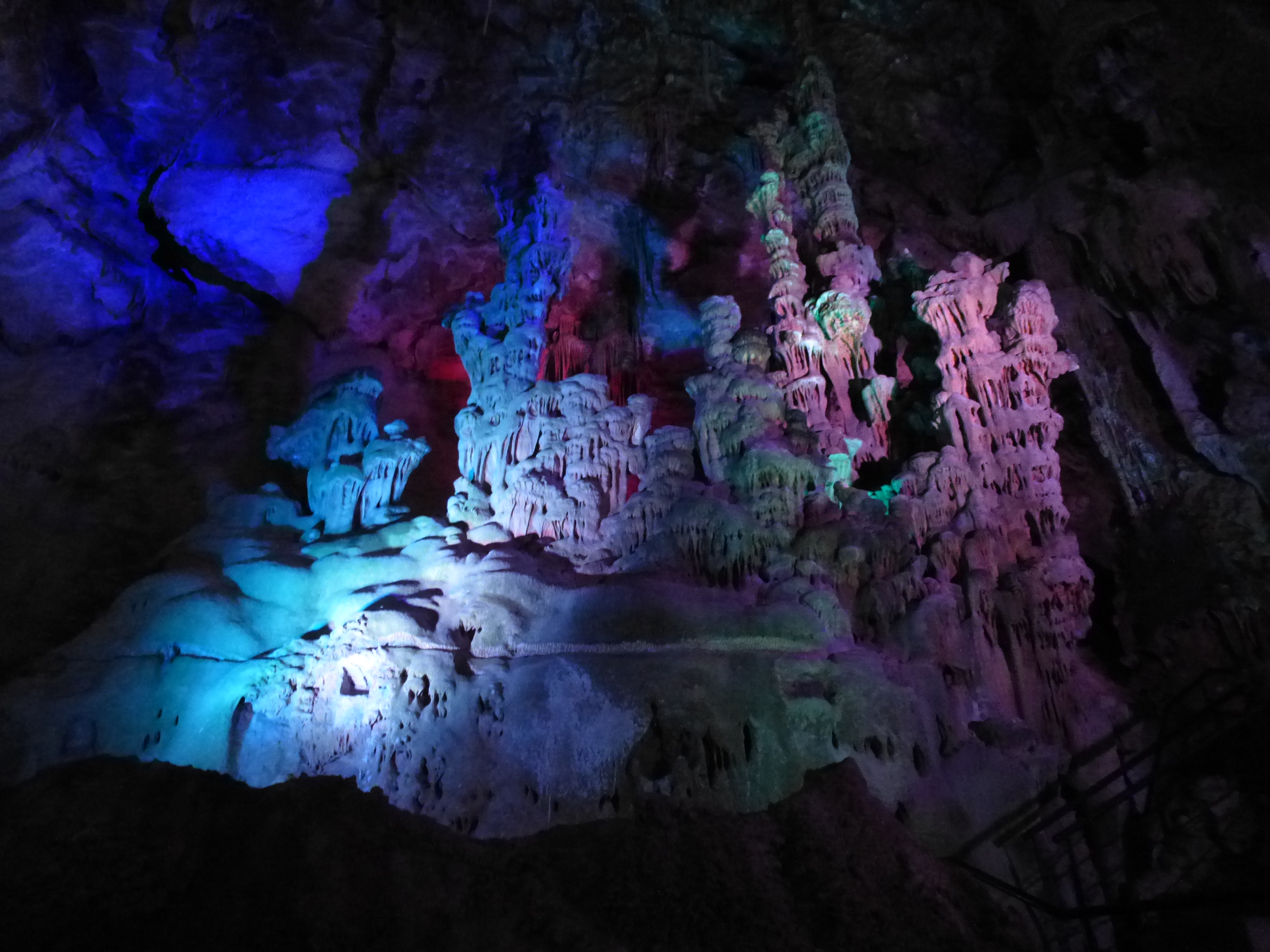
Artificially lit grotto inside the Canelobre Cave

Canalobre Cave (Valencian: Cova dels Canelobres; Spanish: Cueva de Canelobre) (Note: Pronunciation, Valencian: [ˈkɔva ðels kaneˈlɔbɾes], locally [ˈkɔvɔ ðe(l)s kaneˈlɔbɾes] Spanish: [ˈkweβa ðe kaneˈloβɾe]) is a karst cave located in the small municipality of Busot, Alicante Province, in the Valencian Community of Spain. It has an estimated area of at least 18,950 m^{2} (204,000 sq ft). It is one of the largest and one of the most popular caves in the Valencian Community.

The entrance to the cave is at the elevation of about 700 m (2,300 ft) on the northern slopes of the mountain ridge known as Cabeçó d'Or. The cave is known for a large vault of 70 m (230 ft) height similar in shape to a cathedral. The cave contains a wide variety of speleothems, including stalactites, coralloids, stalagmites, flowstones, draperies, columns, helictites, gours, spars, crusts and flowers. Most are formed of calcite, though some in the lower areas are sulfate-based.

Researchers have studied several aspects in the caves, including its microclimate and drip water.
