= Central Valencian =

Dialect of Valencian

- Apitxat Valencian
- valencià central valencià apitxat
- Native to: Spain
- Region: Valencia city and metropolitan area (Valencian Community)
- Language family: Indo-European: Italic; Latino-Faliscan; Latin; Romance; Italo-Western; Western Romance; Gallo-Romance (Note: Also classified as Iberian Romance.); Occitano-Romance; Catalan; Western Catalan; Valencian; Central Valencian
- Early forms: Old Latin: Vulgar Latin; Old Occitan; Old Catalan
- Writing system: Latin script (Valencian alphabet)

Language codes
- ISO 639-3: –
- Glottolog: vale1254
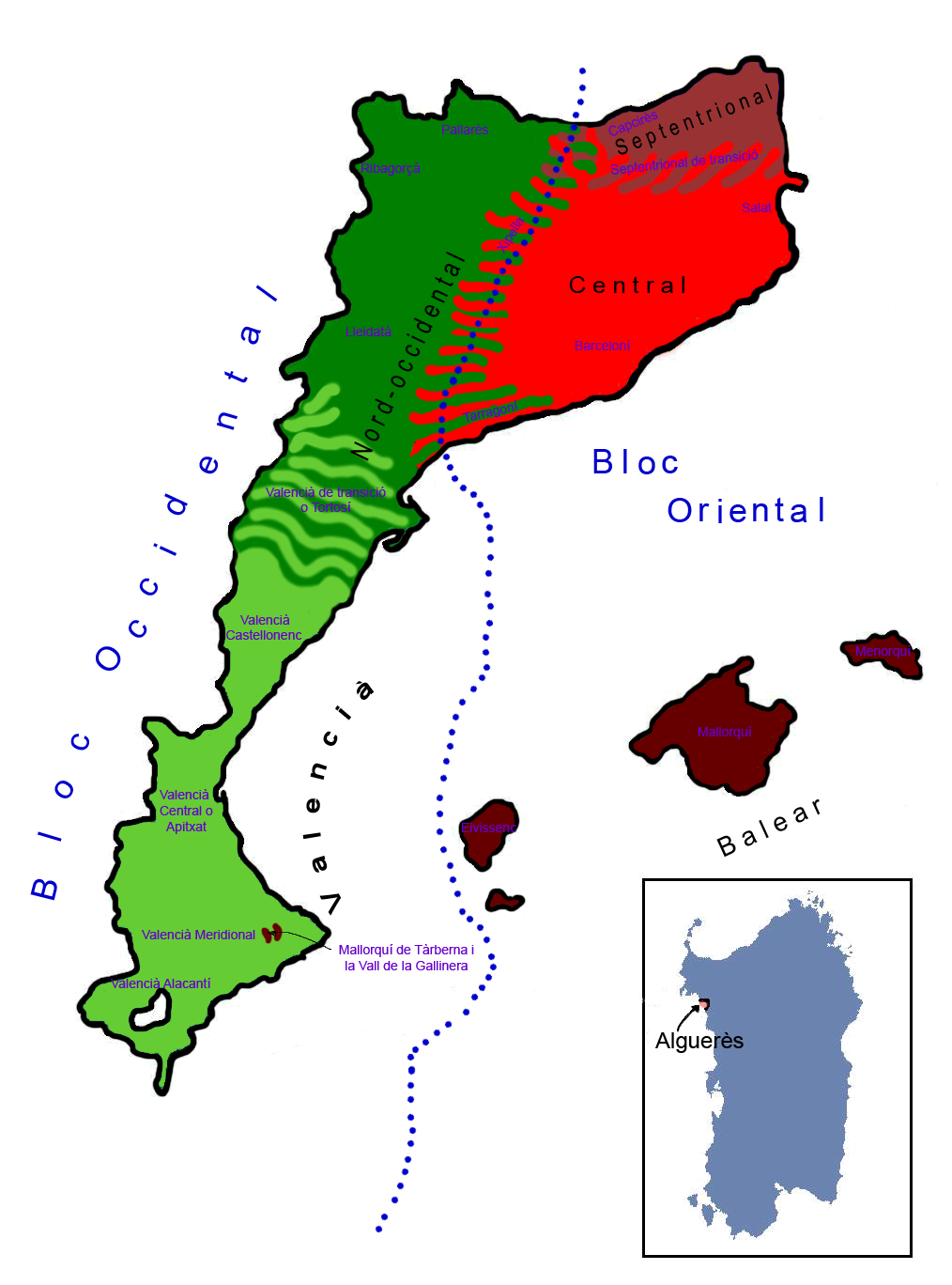
- Dialects of Valencian, including Apitxat Valencian.

Central Valencian (valencià central), popularly known as apitxat, is a dialect of Valencian spoken around the metropolitan area of Valencia in the Valencian Community, and characterised by the devoicing of voiced sibilants.

One of the two most widely spoken dialects of Valencian, it is not however used as the main model for the oral standard in Valencian media and education, and is sometimes connated negatively.

== Features ==
=== Pronunciation ===
Central Valencian's main feature is its systematic devoicing of voiced sibilants (e.g. casa [ˈkäsɐ] 'house', joc [ˈtʃɒ̝k] 'game', instead of /ˈkaza/ and /ˈdʒɔk/, where other Valencians would pronounce [ˈkäzɐ] and [ˈd͡ʒɒ̝k] - a feature shared with Ribagorçan). The names apitxat, parlar apitxat and the verb apitxar all refer to this specific pronunciation pattern - as well as itself representing a prime example of devoicing, since devoiced apitxar is also a synonym of voiced pitjar.

Additionally, ieisme, a pronunciation pattern which affects a large part of the Valencian youth and which is also present in other dialects including in Catalonia and the Balearics, is especially intense in this central zone. Studies have found that even speakers of this dialect over the age of 60 no longer distinguish the traditional, general and standard pronunciation of the double-l as /ʎ/ ⟨ll⟩, which is the lateral articulation, from /j/ ⟨i⟩. This trend is also present in most peninsular Spanish which may explain its prevalence among younger Valencian speakers in more urban areas such as Valencia or Elche.

Another innovation sporadically detected is the aspiration of the /s/ before voiceless stops /p, t, k/: escolta [ɑhˈkoɫ̪tɐ] ('listen'), espera [ɑhˈpeɾɐ] ('wait').

The remaining phonetic features of this dialect are not exclusive: for example, the articulation of the stops in camp [ˈkämp] ('field'), cent [ˈsen̪t] ('hundred') and molt [ˈmoɫ̪t] ('very'), which is present throughout the southern coast. As occurs in areas of southern Valencian, much of northern Valencian, and generally throughout northern and central Catalonia, /v/ merges with /b/, so that /v/ disappears (e.g., viu [ˈbiw] 'he/she lives'). This is particular the case in Camp de Morvedre, Camp de Túria, Horta de València and Foia de Bunyol.

=== Grammar ===
It is in verb morphology where Central Valencian most stands out in comparison with the northern and southern dialects. Some of these features are:

- Preservation of the synthetic or simple past: aní ('I went'), anares ('you went'), anà ('he went'), anàrem ('we went'), anàreu ('you went' pl.), anaren ('they went'). Generally, the speakers of Camp de Morvedre, Camp de Túria, Horta de València and the northern zone of Ribera tend to conserve the synthetic past in all persons. The areas closest to neighbouring dialects, that is, Costera, Safor and the south of Plana (Almenara, Xilxes), demonstrate a more limited use of this synthetic form, which is therefore only retained in the plural (anàrem, anàreu, anaren), alongside the general periphrastic forms used throughout the rest of the Catalan dialects and in standard Valencian (vàrem/vam anar, vàreu/vau anar 'you went' pl., varen/van anar 'they went'). Even in the regions where the synthetic paradigm is still in full force, the periphrastic past is increasingly common, especially for the first person (aní > vaig anar I went, fiu > vaig fer 'I did', viu > vaig viure 'I lived') and the third (cantà > va cantar 's/he sang', digué > va dir 's/he said', feu > va fer 's/he did').
- Another tendency of Central Valencian is the to extend the velarisation of the subjunctive to many gerunds: beguent (instead of bevent, and derived from present and past subjunctive bega, beguera), 'drinking'; creguent (creent, crega, creguera), 'believing'; diguent (dient, diga, diguera), 'saying'; estaguent (estant, estiga, estiguera), 'being, staying'; poguent (podent, puga, poguera), 'can'; siguent (sent, siga, fora), 'being', etc. Furthermore, the palatalised forms of the present indicative also follow this pattern, including the gerund of vore (< veure) 'to see': vejam, vegent instead of veem ('we see') and veent ('seen') [subjunctive veja, vera]; the participle of viure: vixquent ('lived') [subjunctive visca, visquera]; the velarised forms of creure and traure ('take out') in the present of indicative: creguem, traguem, cregueu, tragueu, instead of creem ('we believe'), traem ('we take out'), creeu ('they believe'), traeu ('they take out') [subjunctive crega, creguera, traga traguera]; and also the velarised forms of the present subjunctive of vore and haver: veixca, veigga, haixca or haigga instead of veja ('that I saw') and haja ('that I had'). This pattern is also extended, especially in Ribera and further south, to voicing inchoative forms, i.e. those verbs conjugated with a -ix- infix derived from Latin: partixca > partixga ('that s/he suffered'), servixquen > servixguen ('that they served'); these forms are the result of an analogy with velarised subjunctives such as haigga (haja) i veigga (veja).
- Unlike Castellon and Southern Valencian, the verb fer ('to do') tends to present etymological forms in the present indicative jo faç ('I do') and subjunctive faça ('that I did'), faces ('you do') (Northern and Southern Valencian tend to use exclusively faig, faja, fages). Additionally, this dialect retains the classical verb endings -am and -au of the first and second person of the present subjunctive plural and the imperative second and third conjugations (batam, digau, vullgam, etc.), which in parts of the south and, especially in Castellon and northern dialects, tend to be replaced by the more general and standard analogical forms -em and -eu (batem 'we beat', digueu 'say', vullguem 'that we wanted', etc.). As regards the -am and -au endings, some speakers of Camp de Morvedre, Horta and Ribera Alta also use them in the present indicative: no sabeu lo que digau (dieu) ('you don't know what you're saying'); no vejam (veem) res, està molt fosc ('we can't see anything, it's very dark').

== See also ==
- Northern Valencian
- Southern Valencian
  - Alicante Valencian

== Bibliography ==
- Recasens i Vives, Daniel (1996) [1991], Fonètica descriptiva del català: assaig de caracterització de la pronúncia del vocalisme i el consonantisme català al segle XX, Biblioteca Filològica (in Catalan), vol. 21 (2nd ed.), Barcelona. Spain: Institut d'Estudis Catalans, ISBN 978-84-7283-312-8
- Saborit i Vilar, Josep (2009), Millorem la pronúncia (in Valencian), Acadèmia Valenciana de la Llengua
- Sanchis i Guarner, Manuel (2005), La llengua dels valencians (in Valencian) (20 ed.), Valencia: Edicions 3 i 4, ISBN 84-7502-082-8
