= Northern Valencian =

Dialect of Valencian

- valencià septentrional
- Native to: Spain
- Region: Northern Valencian Community (Castellon), southern Catalonia (south Tarragona and Lleida) and southeastern Aragon (southeast Teruel)
- Language family: Indo-European: Italic; Latino-Faliscan; Latin; Romance; Italo-Western; Western Romance; Gallo-Romance (Note: Also classified as Iberian Romance.); Occitano-Romance; Catalan; Western Catalan; Valencian; Northern Valencian
- Early forms: Old Latin: Vulgar Latin; Old Occitan; Old Catalan
- Dialects: Transitional Valencian; Castellonenc Valencian
- Writing system: Latin script (Valencian alphabet)

Language codes
- ISO 639-3: –
- Glottolog: vale1253
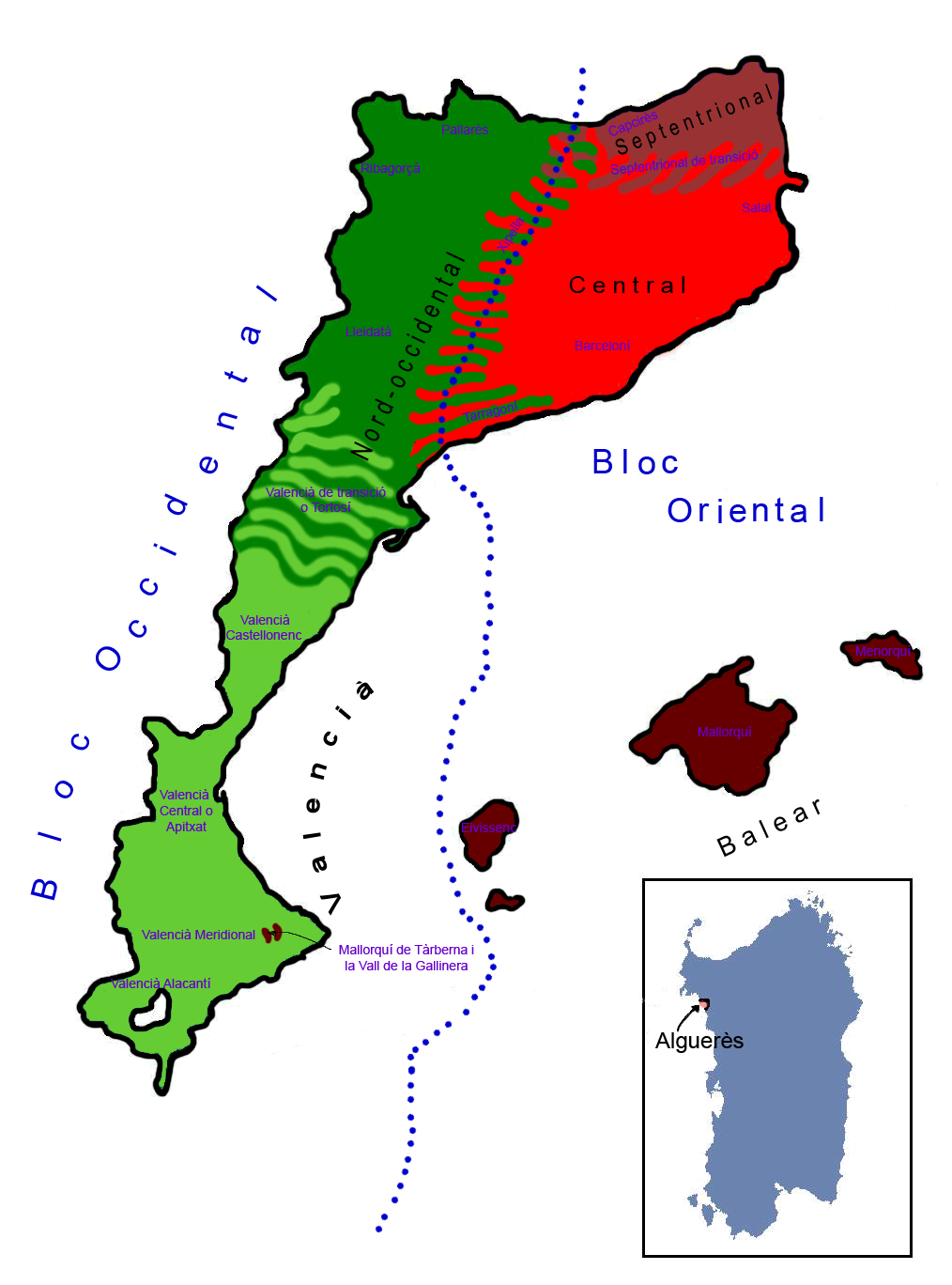
- Dialects of Valencian, including Transitional zones and Castellonenc Valencian (both frequently termed as Northern Valencian).

Northern Valencian (valencià septentrional) is a dialect chain spoken in the north of the Valencian Community and south of Catalonia. It comprises two main varieties: Transitional Valencian (or Transitional Catalan) spoken around the town of Tortosa, and classified as either a dialect of Catalonia (within the North-Western set of dialects), or a Valencian dialect; and Castellon Valencian or Northern Valencian.

== Transitional Valencian ==
=== Phonetic features ===
- Fall of final /ɾ/: canta(r) ('to sing'), millo(r) ('better'), as in all dialects in Catalonia and the Balearic Islands.
- Variable deaffrication of intervocalic /d͡ʒ/: metge ('medic') > me[ʒ]e or me[jʒ]e, bajoca ('green bean') > ba[ʒ]oca or ba[jʒ]oca.
- /uj/ diphthong in cuina ('kitchen') and buit ('empty').

=== Morphology ===
- Desinence in -o for the first person of the present of indicative: parlo instead of parle ('I speak'), dormo instead of dorm(c) ('I sleep'), as in all dialects in Catalonia.
- Tendency to velarised analogical formations of the present of subjunctive: vaiga/vaigue (vaja) 'I go', haiga/haigue (haja) 'I have, there is'.

Subdivisions:

1. Northern Zone. It is the area with stronger Tortosan influence, where the following features are shared: firmer preservation of /d/ in the suffix -ada (vegada 'time', pujada 'rise' and not vegà, pujà); /ɛ/ [æ̈] articulation of final -a (paell[æ̈] 'pan, paella', port[æ̈] 'door', per paella, porta); only exist the forms of the subjunctive imperfect past in -s, like in Tortosan and General Catalan (cantés 'I was singing' or 's/he was singing', fos 'I was doing' or 's/he was doing', patís 'I was suffering' or 's/he was suffering' instead of cantara, fora and patira); preservation of the old literary articles lo and los ('the').
2. Southern Zone. Similar to Tortosan in some features, but generally closer to Valencian: total or partial elision of /d/ in the suffix -ada (entrà, becà, per entrada 'entrance', becada 'beakful, a nap, granted a scholarship'); forms of the imperfect past of subjunctive in -r (pujara 'I was rising' or 's/he was rising', fera 'I was doing' or 's/he was doing', sofrira 'I was suffering' or 's/he was suffering', instead of pugés, fes, sofrís). As we move away inland the linguistic levelling with Castellon's Valencian is each time more noticeable: drop of /d/ in the -ador suffix (llaura(d)or 'farmer', moca(d)or 'tissue'), lost of the phoneme /ʃ/ (calais, creis instead of calaix, creix) and palatalisation of the affricate phonemes /t͡s/ and /d͡z/ (gots > goig, setze > setge). The articles lo and los are changed to el and els, except the coastal zone of Baix Maestrat (from Peníscola to Alcalà). It is peculiar the old speech of Alcalà de Xivert, with almost all its features of the Tortosan zone (lo pare 'the dad', cantàs 'I was singing' or 's/he was singing', etc.), but with the preservation of final -r.

== Castellon Valencian ==
Also termed Castellonenc Valencian. The existence of this dialectal zone opposite to Northern Transitional Valencian is founded by a very symbolical feature for the speakers: the -e of the first person of indicative (pense 'I think', parle 'I speak'). If the criteria for the classification of Castellon Valencian would be based only in the treatment of final -r and the phoneme /d͡ʒ/, would be necessary to circumscribe Castellon Valencian only to the coastal zone between Benicàssim and Xilxes, since this is the area that maintains final -r (cantar 'to sing', fer 'to do', patir 'to suffer') and do not deaffricate ever /d͡ʒ/ in intervocalic position. It is believed that, even though the relevance of these two last features, the grouping of Alcalatén and Pla de l'Arc with the northern sector of la Plana is a fact that must take into account the sum of other phonetic features, like the lack of contrast between /ʃ/ and /s/, the palatalisation of /t͡s/ and /d͡z/, the use of the diphthong /wi/ in cuit ('cooked') and huit ('eight') and the model of verbal conjugation.

Subdivisions:

1. Northern Zone. In this area, the phonetic features noted for the southern area of northern Valencian are generalised: elision of /d/ in the suffix -ada (entrà, becà, per entrada, becada) and normally also in the -ador suffix (llaura(d)or 'farmer', moca(d)or 'tissue'). It is general the pronunciation of /ʃ/ like [s] (calais, creis instead of calaix, creix) and the palatalisation of the affricate phonemes /t͡s/ and /d͡z/ (gots > goig, setze > setge). With punctual exceptions (Borriol i Sant Joan de Moró), the opposition of /b/ and /v/ does not exist now (betacism). In terms of verbal morphology, Northern Castellon Valencian has a very significative feature compared to the southern area of la Plana and Northern Valencian: all final -a of General Valencian systematically change to -e, except for the imperatives (jo/ell parle 'I speak' and 's/he speaks', parlave 'I was speaking' and 's/he was speaking', parlarie 'I would speak' and 's/he would speak', parlare 'I was speaking' and 's/he was speaking', etc., instead of parla, parlava, parlaria and parlara). This morphological feature is also important to include the languages of Alcalatén and Pla de l'Arc within the northern Castellonenc and not in the northern Valencian.
2. Southern Zone. It is the most conservative area of Castellon Valencian and more akin to the general non-apitxat Valencian, with the following peculiarities with respect to the northern sector of la Plana: the process of confluence of the phonemes /s/ and /ʃ/ is less advanced and the same occurs with the distinction of /b/ and /v/, kept, at least, between older people and adults. The voiceless affricate phoneme /t͡s/ becomes normally palatal (gots > goig), but the phoneme /d͡z/ it is kept alveolar, often with epenthesis of [ɾ], [d͡zɾ]: dotze ('twelve'), setze ('sixteen') > dotzre, setzre. The verbal morphology is identical to Traditional General Valencian, with final -a and -e and also with the forms -am and -au of the subjunctive and the imperative of some verbs of the 2nd and 3rd conjugations (vullgam 'we want', vullgau 'you want'). From this area it is very peculiar the speech of Onda and its surroundings, with the complex mixture of dialectal features from the north and south: the devoicing of /d͡ʒ/, the betacism and the appearance of -e instead of final -a: tindrie, face (instead of tindria 'I would have' and 's/he would have', faça 'I do' and 's/he does'), like Northern Castellon Valencian.

== See also ==
- Central Valencian (Apitxat Valencian)
- Southern Valencian
  - Alicante Valencian

== Bibliography ==
- Recasens i Vives, Daniel (1996) [1991], Fonètica descriptiva del català: assaig de caracterització de la pronúncia del vocalisme i el consonantisme català al segle XX, Biblioteca Filològica (in Catalan), vol. 21 (2nd ed.), Barcelona. Spain: Institut d'Estudis Catalans, ISBN 978-84-7283-312-8
- Saborit i Vilar, Josep (2009), Millorem la pronúncia (in Valencian), Acadèmia Valenciana de la Llengua
- Sanchis i Guarner, Manuel (2005), La llengua dels valencians (in Valencian) (20 ed.), Valencia: Edicions 3 i 4, ISBN 84-7502-082-8
