= Busot =

- Municipality
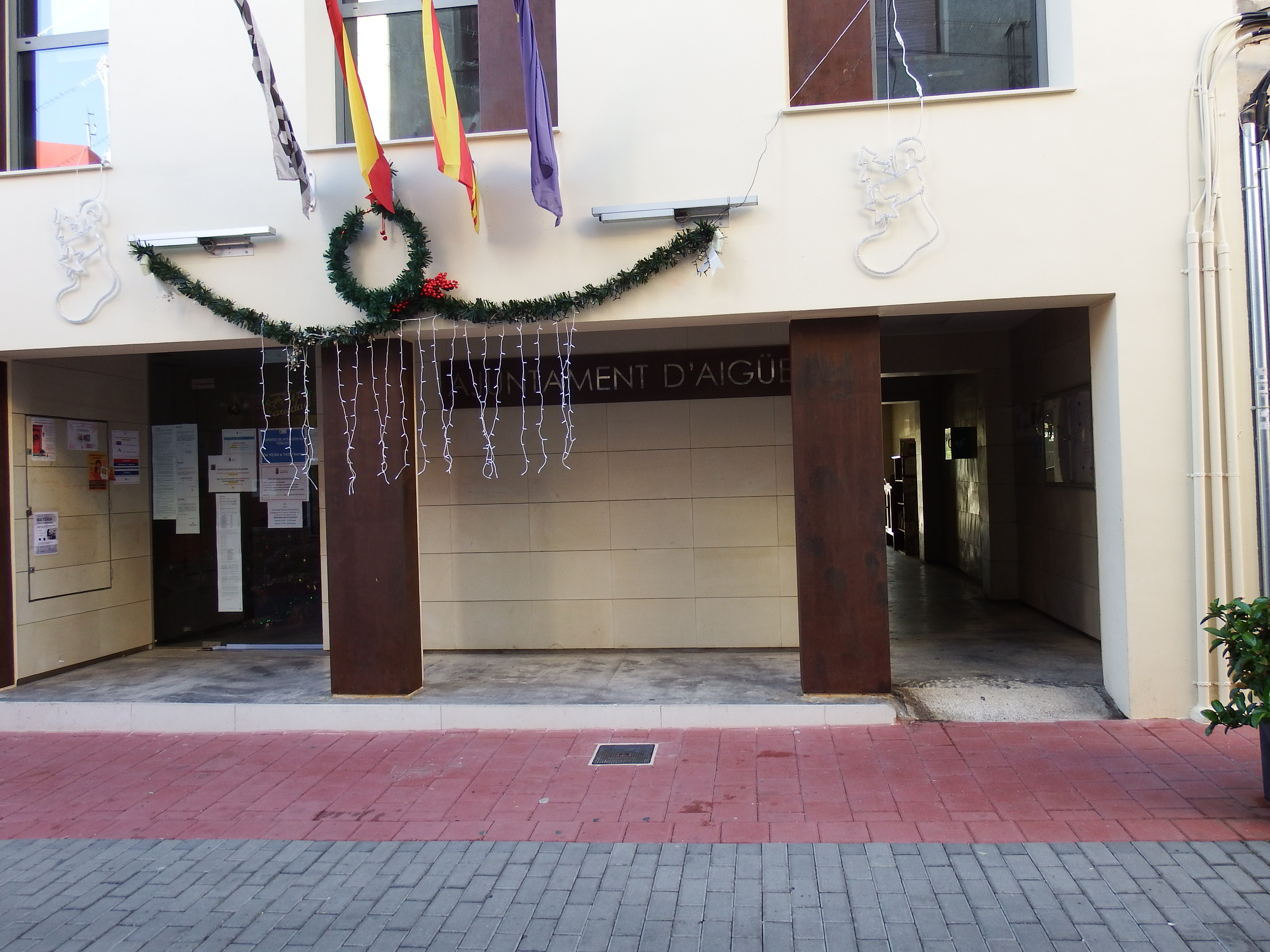
- Town hall

- Flag Coat of arms

- Location in Spain Busot (Valencian Community) Busot (Spain)
- Coordinates: 38°28′53″N 0°25′13″W
- Country: Spain
- Autonomous community: Valencia
- Province: Alicante
- Comarca: Alacantí
- Judicial district: Sant Vicent del Raspeig

Government
  - Alcalde: Alejandro Morant Climent (2007) (PP)

Area
  - Total: 33.84 km^{2} (13.07 sq mi)
- Elevation: 326 m (1,070 ft)

Population (2025-01-01)
  - Total: 3,782
  - Density: 111.8/km^{2} (289.5/sq mi)
- Demonym(s): Busoter, busotera
- Time zone: UTC+1 (CET)
  - Summer (DST): UTC+2 (CEST)
- Postal code: 03111
- Official language(s): Valencian

Busot (Valencian: [buˈzɔt], Spanish: [buˈsot]) is a municipality in the Comarques of the comarca of Alacantí in the Valencian Community, Spain.

The Moros i Cristians (Moors and Christians) festivals are held from Friday to Monday on the weekend after Easter weekend every year.

The Canelobre Cave near the village of Busot is one of the largest caves in Spain at just over 80,000 cubic meters in volume. It is also one of the most visited caves in the Valencian Community. There are views from the cave looking down the valley toward the coastal town of El Campello. Access is from Busot. The caves, or cuevas, were used during the Spanish Civil War for building and repairing vital aircraft engines for a five-year period in the 1930s. The caves were opened to the public in 1965.
