= Max Wheeler (linguist) =

British linguist

- Born: Max Woodfield Wheeler; 1946 (age 79–80); Pinner, Middlesex

Academic background
- Education: Pinner Grammar School
- Alma mater: Corpus Christi College, Oxford, Queen's College, Oxford
- Thesis: Some rules in a Generative Phonology of modern Catalan (1975)

Academic work
- Discipline: Linguist
- Institutions: University of Sussex

Max Wheeler is a British linguist noted for his work on the Catalan language. He is Emeritus Professor of Linguistics of the University of Sussex. His research into Catalan has primarily focused on phonology and on change in inflectional morphology.

He attended Pinner Grammar School before gaining his B.A. from Corpus Christi College, Oxford in 1969. He then received his D.Phil in 1975 from Queen's College, Oxford. While undertaking research at Queen's College, he spent eighteen months studying Catalan language and culture at the University of Barcelona.

He worked as a lecturer and later as senior lecturer in linguistics at the University of Liverpool from 1973 until 1981. Wheeler then worked at the University of Sussex from 1989. From 1998 until 2007 he was the joint editor of the Journal of Catalan Studies. He was appointed Professor of Linguistics in 2006 and Emeritus Professor of Linguistics upon his retirement in 2007.

Since his retirement, he divides his time between Catalonia and the Isle of Man. He has published several articles on Manx language grammar and texts, ranging from a survey of grammatical gender of Manx, to an analysis of the genitive case in Archibald Cregeen's 1838 A Dictionary of the Manks Language.

He is also a director of Lingomann, the Isle of Man branch of the International Linguistics Olympiad.
