= Valencian linguistic conflict =

Conflict between the use of the Spanish and Valencian language in Valencia

The Valencian linguistic conflict, also known as Valencian sociolinguist conflict, refers to the conflict between the use of the Spanish and Valencian languages in Valencia, Spain.

The term is also used to refer to the controversy about the Valencian language and its consideration as an independent language or a dialect of the Catalan language. This conflict involves two different standards: the first one, commonly known as Norms of El Puig, treats Valencian as an independent language, and the other one, based on the Norms of Castelló, considers Valencian as a variety of Catalan. These standards are codified by two rival academies the Royal Academy of Valencian Culture and the Valencian Academy of the Language (AVL) respectively; only the AVL, which tacitly acknowledges that Valencian and Catalan are the same language, has official status within the Valencian Community. This discussion is considered to be secondary when compared to the Valencian language controversy, the institutional diminution of the Valencian language, and the dominance of the Spanish language.

== Origin ==
Valencian sociolinguist Rafael Ninyoles i Monllor coined the term linguistic conflict by the end of the 1960s to refer to certain diglossic situations, such as the Valencian one. In his late works, he described the process of the ongoing substitution of Valencian for Castilian by social elites and the resulting loss of prestige of the vernacular language.

== See also ==
- Battle of Valencia (cultural)
- Resolution concerning principles and criteria for protecting the name and identity of Valencian
- Norms of El Puig
- Linguistics wars

== Bibliography ==
- Climent-Ferrando, Vicent: "El origen y la evolución argumentativa del secesionismo lingüístico valenciano. Un análisis desde la transición hasta la actualidad." – in catalan in english.
- Pardines López, Susanna; Torres, Nathalie (2011). La política Lingüística al País Valencià (PDF). Fundació Nexe. ISBN 978-84-938315-4-7.
- Pradilla, Miguel Ángel (2004). El laberint valencià. Apunts per a una sociolingüística del conflicte. Onada Edicions. ISBN 84-933441-3-3.
