= Resolution concerning principles and criteria for protecting the name and identity of Valencian =

2005 resolution by the Acadèmia Valenciana de la Llengua

The text with the full resolution, in .djvu format.

The Resolution concerning principles and criteria for protecting the name and identity of Valencian (Dictamen de l'Acadèmia Valenciana de la Llengua sobre els principis i criteris per a la defensa de la denominació i l’entitat del valencià) is a normative resolution made by the Acadèmia Valenciana de la Llengua in 2005.

The text recognises the unity of the Catalan-Valencian language and the right of using both denominations for the same language, and asks political organisations to avoid the politicization of linguistics.
