= Murcian Catalan =

Extinct dialect of Valencian

- Murcian Valencian
- Native to: Spain
- Region: Region of Murcia
- Era: 13th-19th century
- Language family: Indo-European: Italic; Latino-Faliscan; Latin; Romance; Italo-Western; Western Romance; Gallo-Romance (Note: Catalan is also classified as Iberian Romance.); Occitano-Romance; Catalan; Western Catalan; Valencian; Murcian Catalan
- Early forms: Old Latin: Vulgar Latin; Old Occitan; Old Catalan
- Writing system: Valencian orthography (Latin script)

Language codes
- ISO 639-3: –
- Glottolog: None
- Historical evolution of Catalan in Murcia

Murcian Catalan, also known as Murcian Valencian, is an extinct dialect of Valencian used in the Region of Murcia in the Late Middle Ages. It became the majority dialect used in the Kingdom of Murcia, especially among Christian repopulators, coming from the territories of the Crown of Aragon. The Catalan language was maintained in the area of Huerta de Murcia probably until around 1400 and in the Campo de Cartagena until around 1500, when it was definitively replaced by Spanish that had been introduced by new waves of settlers coming from Castile. However, Murcian Catalan strongly influenced this Spanish substrate and contributed to shaping what is currently known as Murcian Spanish.

Once Murcian Catalan had disappeared from all these territories during the 19th century, it was reintroduced in a small region of Murcia bordering the Vinalopó valley, Carche, following a repopulation of those lands with Valencian farmers. Currently, their descendants still maintain Catalan in the area, in this case in the Southern Valencian.

== History ==
In 1266, the Crown of Aragon conquered Murcia from the Taifa of Murcia. However, due to the Treaty of Almizra, Aragon returned Murcia to the Crown of Castile. Despite returning its sovereignty to Castile, the area was repopulated mainly with Catalans.

In 1305, the Treaty of Elche was signed, which fixed the borders between Valencia and Murcia and had the exchange of Cartagena from Aragon to Castile. Despite the cession of most of the region of Murcia to Castile, Catalan remained there for well over two hundred years.

Due to the plague pandemics of the 15th century, the population, which was mostly Catalan-speaking, decreased, and for this reason successive repopulations were carried out with Castilians from La Mancha. This population duality created a Castilian full of Catalanisms that has survived to the present day in Murcian Spanish. The replacement of Catalan by Spanish would have been a slow process, given the high percentage of non-Spanish lexical remains that have survived until the 21st century in Murcian. It is likely that the most conservative linguistically speaking would have been the farmers of the Murcian orchard and the fishermen of the coasts of Cartagena and the Mar Menor, who would have remained more attached to their cultural roots and, consequently, to the language of their ancestors.

Later, the plague also ravaged the region of Orihuela in the Kingdom of Valencia and was repopulated with Murcians who had already been Castilianized following the previous repopulation with Manchecans. Throughout the 18th century, Catalan disappeared from Orihuela and its region, where it has only been preserved in Guardamar del Segura and the Orihuela district of Barbarroja.

== Influence on Murcian Spanish ==
Almost three centuries of Catalan presence in the area obviously left an imprint on current Murcian, to the point that Catalan can be considered one of the main substrata of the dialect (which also has Aragonese influence and a possible Mozarabic substrata). In the Horta de Murcia, Murcian is known as "panotxo".

=== Lexicon ===
Although it has often been attempted to attribute the origin of words or idioms characteristic of Murcian to other languages, especially Aragonese (which shares a lot of vocabulary with Catalan), to an almost unknown Mozarabic or even to Occitan, a large part of these idioms, especially lexical ones, can be explained solely by Catalan. In the words of Maria Àngels Viladot, "it seems completely indisputable that the current Murcian dialect must be considered as the result of contact between the Catalan and Castilian languages during the 12th-14th centuries". Justo García Soriano, in his Vocabulario del Dialecto Murciano (Madrid, 1932), concluded that almost half of the peculiar vocabulary of Murcian is of Catalan origin.

So, for example, just in the field of food, in Murcian we find:

abercoque/albercoque, aladroque, alhábega (alfàbrega), bajoca, cranco, floricol, pésoles, tápenas (tàperes, a word still alive today) toña (piece of bread, cake) or tramuso.

Other words related to the garden or kitchen are:

caballón (cavalló), corbilla (sickle, corbella), esparteña, fangue, garba, llanda (tin used for baking), misto, olivera, rodancha, pansío (pansit), socarrín (socarrim).

There is also the verb minchar (from which the famous Michirones, a typical broad bean dish from the Camp de Cartagena and the Horta de Murcia, derive); when something boils it is said to be bulle and a manzana cucada is, in effect, a poma cucada. The Murcian lexicon has, however, many more examples of clear Catalan origin:

- adobar (to marinate, to season)
- ansa (handle)
- bambolla (bubble)
- boria (fog)
- bufar (Note: Applied to blowing walls due to humidity, inflating something or fighting in a row.)
- cabernera/cavernera/cagarnera
- canute
- charreta (animated conversation)
- despendolar/despendolao (to hang)
- embozar (to emboss)
- esclafar (crush)
- espolsar/espolsador (dust/duster)
- estufío
- gavarrote
- gresca
- lebeche
- leja (shelf)
- mañaco (maniac, docile)
- minso (in the sense of fake, someone you can't trust)
- polsaguera
- rampazo (cramp)
- rebuche (rejection)
- remiljo (small amount, scallion)
- remor (in the sense of "our")

=== Phraseology ===
There are also numerous expressions and phrases identical to those in Catalan, such as beber a gallete or ir del bracete. Not having a clear head, being foggy, is said in Murcian as estar emboriao and there is also the "Ca" for home: Voy a ca mi abuela.

=== Onomastics and toponymy ===
Also in the field of onomastics we find Catalan in Murcia, since many of the old Catalan surnames have been Spanishized and have given new forms such as "Arnao" (Arnau), "Bienvingud" (Benvingut), "Durante" (Duran), "Cerdán" (Cerdà), "Picón" (Picó), "Puche" (Puig), "Pujalte, Pujante" (Pujalt), "Reche" (Reig) and "Roche" (Roig).

Regarding toponymy, the island outside the Mar Menor, east of La Manga, is called Isla Grosa. There are also the places of Calarreona, Calnegre and Calblanque among many others. In Murcia there is, since the time of James I of Aragon, the parish of "Santa Olalla de los Catalanes", currently known as the parish of Santa Eulàlia. One of the best-known streets in the city of Murcia, Calle Trapería, is already mentioned in the Crònica de Muntaner as the street of Drapery.

=== Popular culture ===
The imprint of the Catalan presence left numerous traces in the popular culture of Murcia, even beyond the time when Catalan was still spoken in the area. Two centuries after it disappeared from the city of Murcia in 1604, there is still documentary evidence of the use of the Cucafera during the Feast of Corpus Christi in the city, a custom widespread throughout the former Crown of Aragon.

In terms of gastronomy, the region of Murcia shares several specialties with the Catalan Countries, such as Botifarra (the Murcian one is, above all, the black one), Paella (the so-called "paella huertana" stands out) and the various snail dishes, which are highly valued in the area.

== Carche Catalan ==
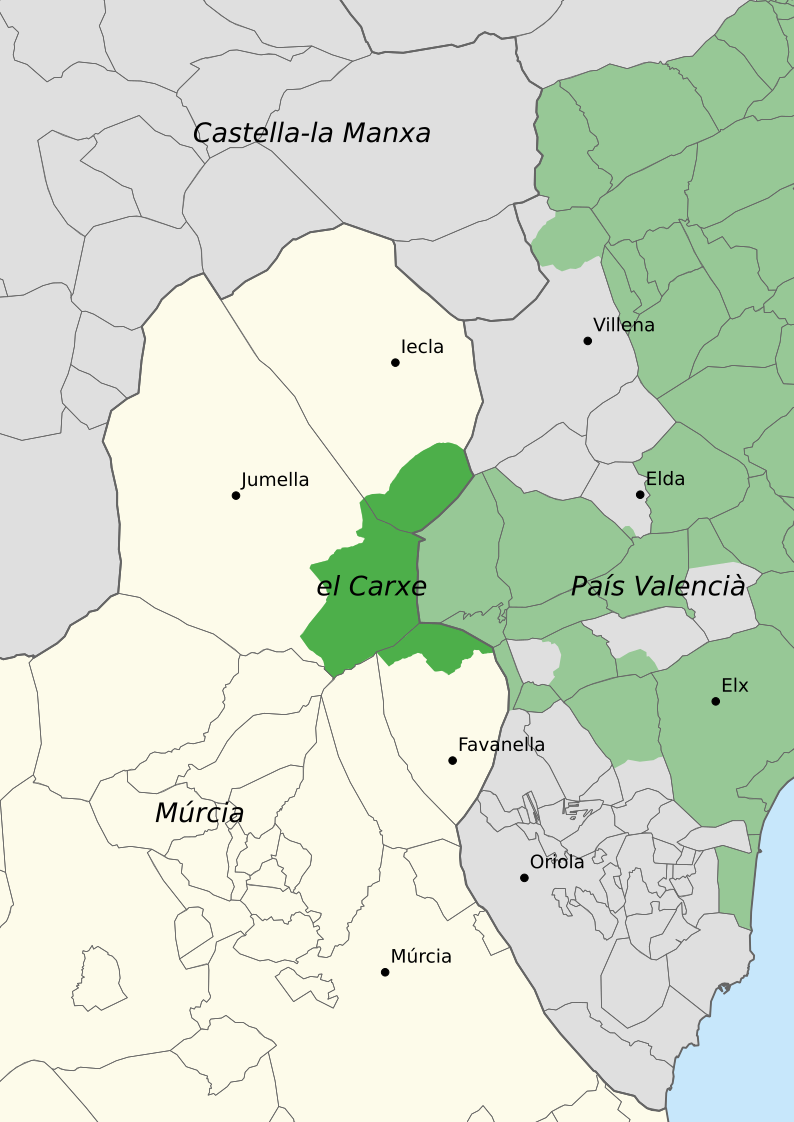
Scope of Catalan in Carche

After the expulsion of the Moors in the 17th century, much of the extensive Murcian areas of Iecla, Jumella and Favanella remained almost depopulated. These lands were dedicated to pastures and, in the period from 1878 to 1887 , given on emphyteusis for agricultural exploitation. This caused a strong immigration of farmers from the Vinalopó valleys, which was the origin of the current Valencian of Carxe (some sources considerably delay the date of the beginning of the arrival of Valencian settlers, since according to an informant from La Canyada de l'Alenya, her mother, born in 1877, was the great-granddaughter of the first settlers who arrived from Novelda). The Valencian settlers settled in the plains that form the headlands of the Favanella and Raixa boulevards and also further north, almost to the edge of Iecla, always in the view of the Carche mountain range (from which the region takes its name). The towns and villages they founded there have always remained as districts of Iecla, Jumella and Favanella.

Due to the origin of these settlers, Southern Valencian is spoken in Carche. Specifically, in the northern half the newcomers came from Pinoso and Monòver and in the southern half, from Algueña and Novelda. This difference in origins can still be seen in speech: for example, in the north the forms venir and tenir, typical of Monòver, still predominate, while in the south vindre and tindre, typical of Novelda, predominate. It can also be seen in toponymy: in the north there are toponyms originating from anthroponyms typical of Monòver and Pinoso, while in the south there are those from Alguenya and Novelda. Among the most relevant features of the speech of Carche are vowel harmony, the loss of the final -r, the yeism and the betacism.

The existence of a new Catalan-speaking community in Murcia remained unnoticed until 1919-1921, when Pere Barnils and Antoni Griera published separate studies in the Butlletí de Dialectologia Catalana. Later, in 1950, Manuel Sanchis i Guarner gave some initial news of Carche in his Gramàtica Valenciana. In 1970, Sanchis-Guarner deepened his studies by analyzing the dialectal characteristics of the area. Recently, the region has also been studied by Brauli Montoya and Esther Limorti, among others.

== Bibliography ==
- Wheeler, Max H. (2006), "Catalan", Encyclopedia of Language and Linguistics, Elsevier, ISBN 978-0-08-044299-0
- Beltran i Calvo, Vicent (2008). El Parlar de les Valls del Vinalopó i del Carxe. Petrer: Centre d'Estudis Locals del Vinalopó. ISBN 978-84-612-2710-5.
- Jareño López, Antonio-Mateo (1993). Radiografía de los territorios murcianos de habla valenciana. Murcia: A.M. Jareño. ISBN 84-604-7642-1.
- Limorti Payà, Esther (2017). Toponímia del Carxe. Valencia: Publications of the Acadèmia Valenciana de la Llengua. ISBN 978-84-482-6155-9.
- Montoya Abat, Brauli (2002). La situació del català al País Valencià: de València al Carxe i Guardamar. Patronat de l'Escola Municipal de Mallorquí.
