= Lexical differences between Catalan and Valencian =

There are numerous lexical differences between Catalan and Valencian, as well as differences between other variants of the same linguistic domain.

Valencian vocabulary contains words both restricted to the Valencian-speaking domain, as well as words shared with other Catalan varieties, especially with North-Western ones. Words are rarely spread evenly over the Valencian Community, but are usually contained to parts of it, or spread out into other dialectal areas. Examples include hui 'today' (found in all of Valencia except transitional dialects, in Northern dialects avui) and espill 'mirror' (shared with North-Western dialects, Central Catalan mirall). There is also variation within Valencia, such as 'corn', which is dacsa in Central and Southern Valencian, but panís in Alicante and Northern Valencian (as well as in North-Western Catalan). Since Standard Valencian is based on the Southern dialect, words from this dialect are often used as primary forms in the standard language, despite other words traditionally being used in other Valencian dialects. Examples of this are tomaca 'tomato' (which is tomata outside of Southern Valencian) and matalaf 'mattress' (which is matalap in parts of Valencia, including the Southern Valencian area).

== List of terms in Valencian vs. Catalan ==
Written varieties (phonetics)
Valencian (AVL)	Catalan (IEC)	English
anglés	anglès	English
conéixer	conèixer	to know
traure	treure	take out
nàixer	néixer	to be born
cànter	càntir	pitcher
redó	rodó	round
meua	meva	my, mine
huit	vuit	eight
ametla	ametlla	almond
estrela	estrella	star
colp	cop	hit
llangosta	llagosta	lobster
hòmens	homes	men
servici	servei	service
orde	ordre	order

Below are a selection of words which differ or have different forms in Standard Valencian and Catalan. In many cases, both standards include this variation in their respective dictionaries, but differ as to what form is considered primary. In other cases, Valencian includes colloquial forms not present in the IEC standard. Primary forms in each standard are shown in bold (and may be more than one form). Words in brackets are present in the standard in question, but differ in meaning from how the cognate is used in the other standard.

Standard Valencian (AVL)	Standard Catalan (IEC)	English
**ací**, aquí	**aquí**, ací	here
**avi**, iaio, uelo	**avi**, iaio	grandpa
**així**, aixina	**així**	like this
**artista**; artiste, -a	**artista**	artist
**bou**, brau, toro	**toro**, bou, brau	bull
**brull**, brossat, mató	**mató**, brull, brossat	curd cheese
**bresquilla**, préssec	**préssec**, bresquilla	peach
**festa**, **comboi**	**festa**	fest (comboi may also mean 'commotion, chaos')
**corder**, xai, anyell	**xai**, corder, anyell	lamb
**creïlla**, patata	**patata**, creïlla	potato
**dacsa**, panís	**blat de moro**, panís	corn
**dènou**, dèneu, dinou	**dinou**, dènou	nineteen
**dos**, dues	**dues**, dos	two (f.)
**eixe**, **aqueix**	**aqueix**, eixe	that
**eixir**, sortir	**sortir**, eixir	to exit, leave
**engrunsador(a)**, gronxador(a)	**gronxador(a)**	swing
**espill**, mirall	**mirall**, espill	mirror
**este**, **aquest**	**aquest**, este	this
**fraula**, maduixa	**maduixa**, fraula	strawberry
**germà**, tete	**germà**	brother
**granera**, escombra	**escombra**, granera	broom
**hui**, avui	**avui**, hui	today
**llaurador**, pagés	**pagès**, laurador	farmer
**llepolia**	**llaminadura**, llepolia	sweet/candy
**lluny**, llunt	**lluny**	far
**matalaf**, matalap, matalàs	**matalàs**, matalaf	mattress
**melic**	**llombrígol**, melic	belly button
**meló d'Alger**, meló d'aigua, síndria	**síndria**, meló d'Alger, meló d'aigua	watermelon
**menut**, petit	**petit**, menut	small/little (menut may also mean 'small/little boy, child')
**mitat**, meitat	**meitat**, mitat	half
**nen**, **nano**	**nen**/**nin**, **nano**	small/little boy, child
**palometa**, papallona	**papallona**, palometa	butterfly
**palmito**, ventall	**ventall**	fan (hand-held device)
**paréixer**, semblar	**semblar**, parèixer	to seem
**pàrvul**, infant, minyó	**pàrvul**, **infant**, **minyó**	infant, child (minyó may also mean 'lad' and pàrvul 'preschooler')
**per favor**	**si us plau**, per favor	please
**poal**	**galleda**	bucket
**quint**, cinqué	**cinquè**, quint	fifth
**rabosa**, guineu	**guineu**, rabosa	fox
**roí(n)**, dolent	**dolent**, roí	bad, evil
**roig**, vermell	**vermell**, roig	red
**safanòria**, **carlota**	**pastanaga**, safanòria, carrota	carrot
**sext**, sisé	**sisè**, sext	sixth
**tenda**, botiga	**botiga**, tenda	shop/store
**tindre**, tenir	**tenir**, tindre	to have
**tomaca**, tomàquet, tomata	**tomàquet**, tomaca, tomata	tomato
**vacacions**, vacances	**vacances**, vacacions	holidays
**vesprada**	**tarda**	afternoon
**veure**, vore	**veure**	to see
**vindre**, venir	**venir**, vindre	to come
**xic**, **xicó**, **xicon**, **xiquet**	**noi**, xic	boy (also small/little boy, child)
**xic**, **xicó**, **xicon**, **xiquet**	**noiet**; xicó, xiquet	boy (also small/little boy, child)
**xicot**, ***nóvio**	**xicot**, ***nòvio**	boy, boyfriend
**xicotet**, **xicotiu**, etc.	**petitet**, **petitiu**, etc.	small/little
**xicotet**, **xicotiu**, etc.	**noiet**	small/little boy, child
