= Raspay =

- Village
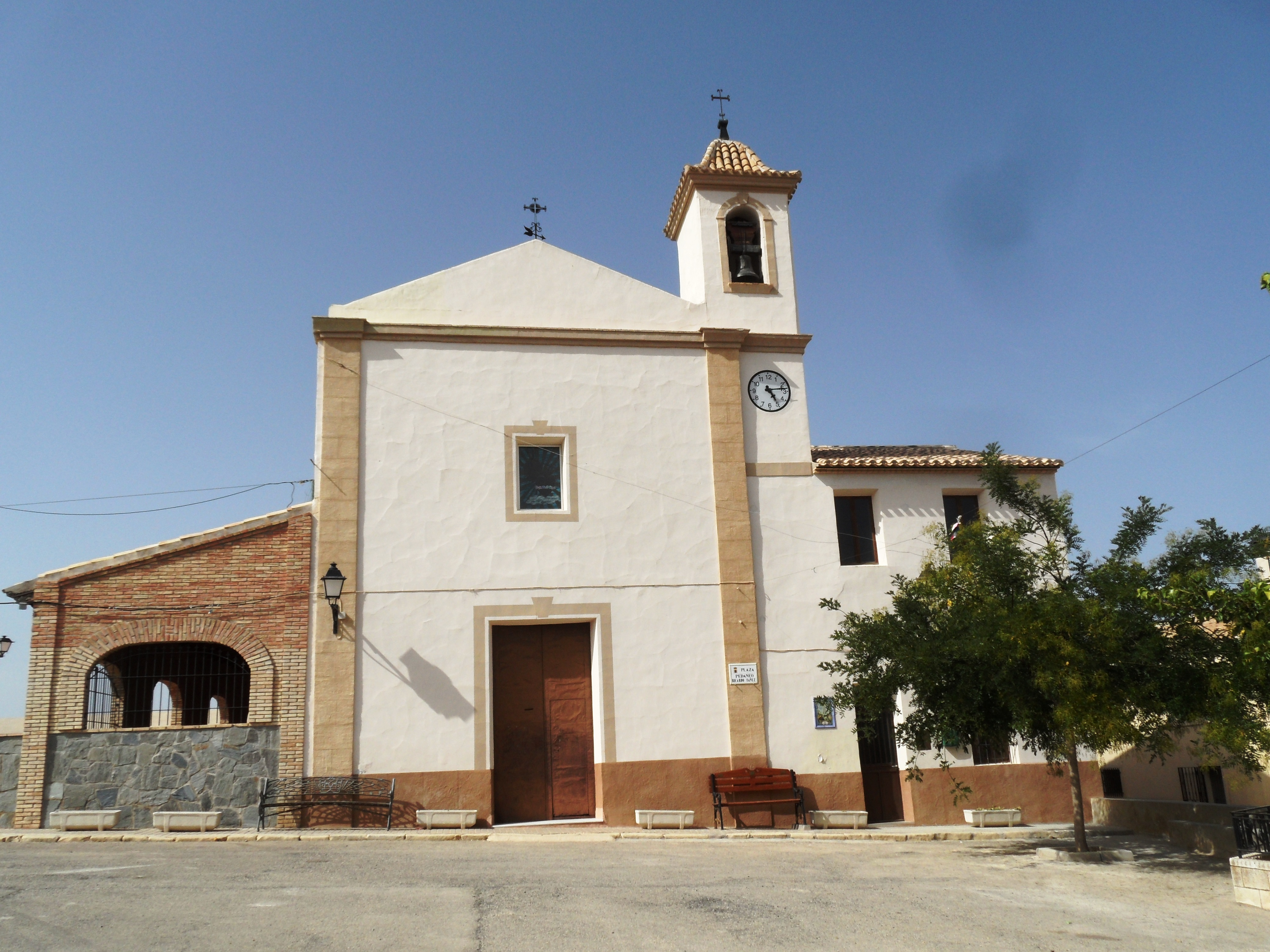

- Location within Spain Location within Europe Location within Earth
- Coordinates: 38°26′35.65″N 1°05′25.72″W
- Country: Spain
- Province: Murcia
- Municipality: Murcia

Population (2017)
  - Total: 100

Raspay (Valencian: El Raspai) is a village in the municipality of Yecla, eastern Spain. Its population consisted of 100 inhabitants in the year 2017.

== Geography ==
Raspay is 23 kilometres (14 mi) from the capital of its municipality (the town of Yecla). The village is located in the foothill Sierra de las Pansas of the mountain range Sierra del Carche.

== History ==
The first document referencing the village is from 1855. In that year, Antonio Ibáñez was given control of the rectory in Raspay and became the first priest of this territory.

Since 2005, courses to boost the Valencian language in the village and in other adjacent towns of the Catalan-speaking region of Carche are being promoted.

== Demographics ==
A third of the inhabitants are foreigners and they all come from other countries of Europe. Two thirds of the inhabitants are older than 60 years and about 7% of locals are younger than 15 years old, which is approximately half of the proportion of under-15's nationwide.
