= Folch =

Folch may refer to:

== People ==
- Albert Folch Folch, Catalan scientist, writer, and artist
- Anna Sophia Folch (born 1985), Brazilian actress
- Fernando Ramon Folch, 2nd Duke of Cardona, (1470–1543), Spanish noble, 2nd Duke of Cardona and Viceroy of Sicily
- Folch solution, a solution containing chloroform and methanol
- Jordi Folch Pi, a Catalan biochemist at Harvard University (McLean Hospital)
- José Solís Folch de Cardona, (1716–1770), Spanish colonial administrator and viceroy of New Granada
- Juan Ramón Folch de Cardona y Ximenez de Arenós, (1418–1485), 4th Count of Cardona, Viceroy of Sicily
- Maikel Folch (born 1980), left-handed pitcher for the Cuban national baseball team
- Ramon Folch i Guillèn (born 1946), Catalan socio-ecologist
- Ramón Folch Frigola (born 1989), Catalan footballer
- Sancho Folch de Cardona, 1st Marquess of Guadalest, heir son of Alfonso Folch de Cardona y Fajardo

== Other ==
- The Folch Mineral Collection (Barcelona, Spain), one of the best mineral collections in Europe
