= Carche =

Area in the Region of Murcia, Spain

Coordinates: 38°25′38″N 1°09′53″W

Location of Carche in the Region of Murcia.

Carche (Spanish: El Carche [el ˈkaɾtʃe]; Valencian: El Carxe [el ˈkaɾtʃe]) is a mountainous, sparsely populated area in the Region of Murcia, Spain, lying between the municipalities of Jumilla and Yecla. The mountains reach an elevation of 1,371 metres at the Pico de la Madama and part of the region has the status of regional park. Three villages border the park: Raspay, La Alberquilla and Carche, with a total of 182 inhabitants (2005).

== Other meanings ==
The name also refers to an extended zone within the Murcian municipalities Yecla, Jumilla and Abanilla with towns in which part of the population speaks Valencian. It covers an area of about 300 square kilometres and has 533 registered citizens (2005).

It is also the name of a hamlet, the largest town in the region in terms of surface area, but the smallest in population.

== Valencian language in Murcia ==
Following sociolinguistic research carried out by Pere Barnils and Antoni Griera, who published their results in Dialectes Catalans (1919), El valencià (1921), and in Butlletí de Dialectologia Catalana VII, El Carche was recognized for the first time as an area where Valencian was spoken. Later, Manuel Sanchis i Guarner analysed in detail the distinctive traits of the dialect spoken there. Even though Valencian is not officially recognised in Murcia, the Acadèmia Valenciana de la Llengua organises classes in Valencian in Yecla upon request of the respective municipality.

== History ==
After the expulsion of the Moriscos in the 17th century, large parts of Yecla, Jumilla as well as Abanilla have remained depopulated. These areas were used as pastureland from 1878 to 1887 and later for agriculture (mostly vineyards).

Since then these areas have been the focus of emigration of Valencian-speaking agricultural workers from the neighbouring Vinalopó valley in the Alicante province, especially from the area around the town of Pinoso, carrying their language with them. The greater bulk of Valencian speakers made it into the area in relatively recent times, by the 19th and 20th centuries, which explains why this piece of land was never a part of the historic Kingdom of Valencia, and therefore it lies out of the boundaries of the modern day Valencian Community.

Those people settled in the plains forming the source for the Abanilla and Raja, in some cases—Carrascalejo, los Pinillos—also further north almost up to Yecla, and always within reach of the mountains of Carche, after which the comarca is called. They founded about twenty small towns and places which never managed to reach administrative independency from either the municipalities of Yecla and Jumilla (the hamlets of La Arbequilla, La Raja, La Torre del Rico, Cañada del Trigo and La Zarza or from Abanilla (the hamlets of El Collado de los Gabrieles, Cañada de la Leña and Umbría de la Zarza).

== Demography ==
Due to substantial emigration, mainly caused by an agricultural crisis, the population of the region of El Carche, which was about 3,000 in 1950, currently numbers 500. Some of the hamlets, especially those with scattered settlements, are now completely abandoned. Most of the inhabitants, although still registered as residents in El Carche, live in the Murcian villages of Yecla and Jumilla or in the Valencian town of Pinoso and only commute into the area to carry out their jobs related to agriculture.

Population distribution:

- In the municipality Jumilla:
  - Torre del Rico, 59 inhabitants.
  - El Carche, 35 inhabitants.
  - Cañada del Trigo, 158 inhabitants,
- Raspay, 129 inhabitants, Yecla.
- Cañada de la Leña, 152 inhabitants, Abanilla.
