= Rafael Ninyoles i Monllor =

Spanish sociolinguist (1943–2019)

Rafael Lluís Ninyoles i Monllor (1943 – 25 October 2019) was a Spanish sociolinguist, considered one of the parents of Catalan sociolinguistics along with Lluís Vicent Aracil i Boned.

He was born in Valencia. He took secondary studies in a Jesuit school, where he met Alfons Cucó, Eliseu Climent and Lluís Vicent Aracil. Afterwards, he graduated in sociolinguistics at Universitat de València and then he travelled to the United States of America in 1967.

Later on, he became Sociology professor in the Faculty of Economic Sciences of Valencia, and he worked as expert in Diputació de València and Generalitat Valenciana. Jointly with Aracil, he questioned bilingualism and introduced the concept of diglossia for defining the situation of Catalan language speakers. He collaborated in several journals and magazines such as Serra d'Or, Gorg, Cuadernos para el Diálogo or El País mostly about the Valencian linguistic conflict.

== Works ==
- L'opinió pública (1968)
- Conflicte lingüístic valencià (1969)
- Idioma i prejudici (1971)
- Sociología del lenguaje (1974)
- Estructura social y política lingüística (1975)
- Cuatro idiomas para un estado (1977)
- Madre España (1979)
- Idioma i poder social (1980)
- Estructura social i política lingüística (1989)
- El País Valencià a l'eix mediterrani (1992)
- Informe sociològic de les comarques centrals valencianes (1996)
- Sociologia de la ciutat de València (1996)
