= Normes de Castelló =

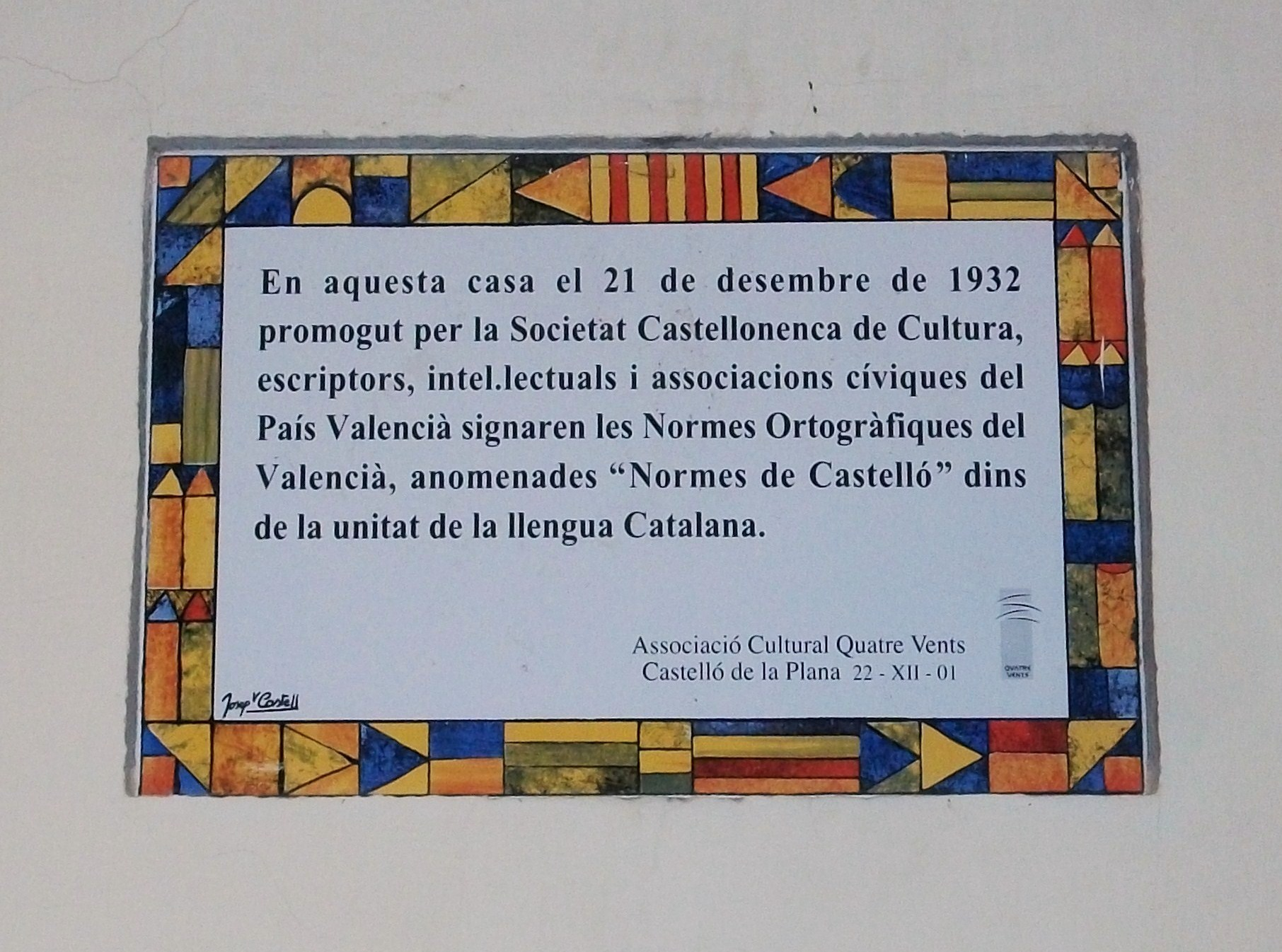
Plaque commemorating the Normes de Castelló, Cavallers street in Castelló de la Plana

Normes de Castelló (Valencian: [ˈnoɾmez ðe kasteˈʎo], "Norms of Castelló" or "Castelló Norms"), also known as Normes del 32 ([ˈnoɾmez ðel ˌtɾentaˈdos]), are elementary orthographic guidelines that follow Pompeu Fabra's Catalan language norms for its Valencian variety. They were signed in 1932 in Castelló de la Plana by the most relevant cultural institutions of the Valencian Community.

They may be regarded as a compromise in the sense that they respect the essence and style of Fabran guidelines, but they also allow the use of Valencian idiosyncrasies. They are not a set of complete orthographic norms, but a guide. Present standard Valencian follows approximately these recommendations, but some points are not currently considered orthographic and vice versa. The Acadèmia Valenciana de la Llengua (AVL) has expanded upon these guidelines to the present day.

== See also ==
- Acadèmia Valenciana de la Llengua (AVL)
