= Folch solution =

Solution containing chloroform and methanol

A Folch solution is a solution containing chloroform and methanol, usually in a 2:1 (vol/vol) ratio. One of its uses is in separating polar from nonpolar compounds, for example separating nonpolar lipids from polar proteins and carbohydrates in blood serum.
