= Valencian language =

Language of the Valencian Community

Valencian
- valencià
- Pronunciation: [valensiˈa] (Note: English pronunciation: /vəˈlɛnsiən, -ʃ(i)ən/ və-LEN-see-ən, -sh(ee-)ən. Valencian pronunciation: [valensiˈa]. Alternative local pronunciations include: [valenˈsja] (diphthongisation) and [balenˈsja] (betacism and diphthongisation). Catalan pronunciation: [bələnsiˈa] (Central and Northern), [balensiˈa] (North-Western), [vələnsiˈa] (Balearic) and [valansiˈa] (Algherese).)
- Native to: Spain
- Region: Valencian Community, Region of Murcia (Carche); See also: Geographic distribution of Catalan
- Ethnicity: Valencians
- Speakers: 2 million (2008)
- Language family: Indo-European: Italic; Latino-Faliscan; Latin; Romance; Italo-Western; Western Romance; Gallo-Romance (Note: Catalan/Valencian can be classified as either Gallo-Romance or Iberian Romance.); Occitano-Romance; Catalan; Western Catalan; Valencian
- Early forms: Old Latin: Vulgar Latin; Old Occitan; Old Catalan
- Dialects: Northern (Note: Valencian dialectal zones: "Northern Valencian" may include Castellonenc and Transitional Valencian–Catalan varieties.; "Central Valencian", colloquially known as apitxat, includes the Valencian spoken around the city of Valencia and its metropolitan area (see also Horta of Valencia).; "Southern Valencian" often includes the subvarieties: Alacantí and Murcian (defunct, except in Carche).); Central; Southern; Murcian†
- Writing system: Latin script (Valencian alphabet)

Official status
- Official language in: Spain: Valencian Community
- Recognised minority language in: Spain: Carche, Region of Murcia
- Regulated by: Acadèmia Valenciana de la Llengua (AVL)

Language codes
- ISO 639-3: –
- ISO 639-6: vlca
- Glottolog: vale1252
- Linguasphere: 51-AAA-ed
- IETF: ca-valencia
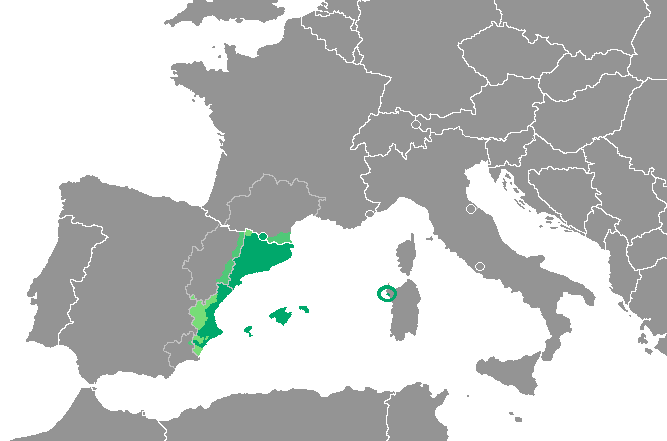

Valencian (valencià) or the Valencian language (llengua valenciana) (Note: Also known as idioma valencià.) is the official, historical and traditional name used in the Valencian Community to refer to the Romance language also known as Catalan, (Note: The Valencian Normative Dictionary of the Valencian Academy of the Language states that Valencian is a "Romance language spoken in the Valencian Community, as well as in Catalonia, the Balearic Islands, the French department of the Pyrénées-Orientales, the Principality of Andorra, the eastern flank of Aragon and the Sardinian town of Alghero (unique in Italy), where it receives the name of 'Catalan'.") either as a whole (Note: The Catalan Language Dictionary of the Institut d'Estudis Catalans states in the sixth definition of Valencian that it is equivalent to Catalan language in the Valencian Community.) or in its Valencia-specific linguistic forms. (Note: The Catalan Language Dictionary of the Institut d'Estudis Catalans states in the second definition of Valencian that it is the Western dialect of Catalan spoken in the Valencian Community.) The Valencian Community's 1982 Statute of Autonomy officially recognises Valencian as the name of the native language.

Valencian displays transitional features between Ibero-Romance languages and Gallo-Romance languages. According to philological studies, the varieties of this language spoken in the Valencian Community and Carche cannot be considered a single dialect restricted to these borders: the several dialects of Valencian (Alacantí, Southern Valencian, Central Valencian or Apitxat, Northern Valencian or Castellonenc and Transitional Valencian) belong to the Western group of Catalan dialects.

There is a political and cultural controversy within the Valencian Community regarding whether it is a glottonym or an independent language. Valencian is regulated by the Acadèmia Valenciana de la Llengua (AVL), following the legacy established by the Castelló Norms, which adapt Catalan orthography to Valencian idiosyncrasies.

Some of the most important works of Valencian literature experienced a Golden Age during the Late Middle Ages and the Renaissance. Important works include Joanot Martorell's chivalric romance Tirant lo Blanch, and Ausiàs March's poetry. The first book produced with movable type in the Iberian Peninsula was printed in the Valencian variety. The earliest recorded chess game with modern rules for moves of the queen and bishop was in the Valencian poem Scachs d'amor (1475).

== History ==
The Valencian language is usually assumed to have spread in the Kingdom of Valencia when Catalan and Aragonese colonists settled the territory after the conquests carried out by James the Conqueror. A new resettlement in the 17th century, after the expulsion of the Moriscos, largely led by Castilians, defined the Spanish language varieties of inland Valencia. However, Valencian has historically been the predominant and administrative language in the kingdom.

The first documental reference to the usage of the term valencià to refer to the spoken language of the Valencians is found in a judicial process of Minorca against Gil de Lozano, dated between 1343 and 1346, in which it is said that the mother of the indicted, Sibila, speaks valencianesch because she was from Orihuela (formerly Oriola).

The concept of Valencian language appeared in the second half of the 14th century and it was progressively consolidated at the same time that its meaning changed due to events of a diverse nature (political, social, economic). In the previous centuries the Catalan spoken in the territory of the Kingdom of Valencia was called in different ways: romanç (13th century) and catalanesch (during the 14th century, for the medieval concept of nation as a linguistic community). The concept of the Valencian language appeared with a particularistic character due to the reinforced nature of the legal entity of the Kingdom of Valencia for being the Mediterranean commercial power during the 14th and 15th centuries, becoming in the cultural and literary centre of the Crown of Aragon. Thus, the Valencians, together with the Majorcans, presented themselves to other peoples as Catalans while they referred to themselves as Valencians and Majorcans to themselves to emphasise the different legal citizenship of each kingdom.

By the 15th century, the so-called Valencian Golden Age, the name "Valencian" was already the usual name of the predominant language of the Kingdom of Valencia, and the names of vulgar, romanç or catalanesch had fallen into disuse. Joanot Martorell, author of the novel Tirant lo Blanch, said: "Me atrevire expondre: no solament de lengua anglesa en portuguesa. Mas encara de portuguesa en vulgar valenciana: per ço que la nacio d·on yo so natural se·n puxa alegrar" ("I dare to express myself: not only from English to Portuguese. But even so from Portuguese to vulgar Valencian: for that the nation I am from born can rejoice").

Since the Spanish democratic transition, the autonomy or heteronomy of Valencian with respect to the rest of the Valencian-Catalan linguistic system has been the subject of debate and controversy among Valencians, usually with a political background. Although in the academic field (universities and institutions of recognised prestige) of linguists the unity of the language has never been questioned since studies of the Romance languages, part of Valencian public opinion believes and affirms that Valencian and Catalan are different languages, an idea that began to spread during the turbulent Valencian transition by sectors of the regionalist right and by the so-called blaverisme (Blaverism). There is an alternative secessionist linguistic regulation, the Normes del Puig (Norms of El Puig), drawn up by the Royal Academy of Valencian Culture (Real Acadèmia de Cultura Valenciana, RACV), an institution founded in 1915 by the Deputation of Valencia, but its use is very marginal.

== Official status ==
The official status of Valencian is regulated by the Spanish Constitution and the Valencian Statute of Autonomy, together with the Law on the Use and Teaching of Valencian (ca).

Article 6 of the Valencian Statute of Autonomy sets the legal status of Valencian, establishing that:

- The native language (Note: The original text says "llengua pròpia", a term that does not have an equivalent in English.) of the Valencian Community is Valencian.
- Valencian is the official language in the Valencian Community, along with Spanish, which is the official language of Spain. Everyone shall have the right to know and use them, and to receive education on Valencian and in Valencian.
- No one can be discriminated against by reason of their language.
- Special protection and respect shall be given to the recuperation of Valencian.
- The Acadèmia Valenciana de la Llengua shall be the normative institution of the Valencian language.

Passed in 1983, the Law on the Use and Teaching of Valencian develops this framework, providing for the implementation of a bilingual educational system, regulating the use of Valencian in the public administration and judiciary system, where citizens can freely use it when acting before both, or establishing the right to be informed by media in Valencian among others.

Valencian is also protected under the European Charter for Regional or Minority Languages, ratified by Spain. However, the Committee of Experts of the Charter has pointed out a considerable number of deficiencies in the application of the Charter by the Spanish and Valencian governments.

== Distribution and usage ==
=== Distribution ===
Unlike in other bilingual autonomous communities, Valencian has not historically been spoken to the same extent throughout the Valencian Community. Slightly more than a quarter of its territory, equivalent to 10-15% of the population (its inland and southernmost areas), is Spanish-speaking since the Middle Ages. Additionally, it is also spoken by a small number of people in the Carche comarca, a rural area in the Region of Murcia adjoining the Valencian Community. Nevertheless, Valencian does not have any official recognition in this area. Nowadays about 600 people are able to speak Valencian in Carche.

The Valencian language is traditionally spoken along the coast and in some inland areas in the provinces of Alicante and Castellon, from Vinaròs (northernmost point of the extension of Valencian on the coast of the Valencian Community) to Guardamar (southernmost point of Valencian). (Note: Historically, the southernmost point of Valencian in the Kingdom of Valencia was Orihuela (Oriola). It was also spoken in further areas in Murcia (including the area of Cartagena), however it became extinct in the majority of the region.) It is spoken by approximately 2 million people (2008).

=== Knowledge and usage ===
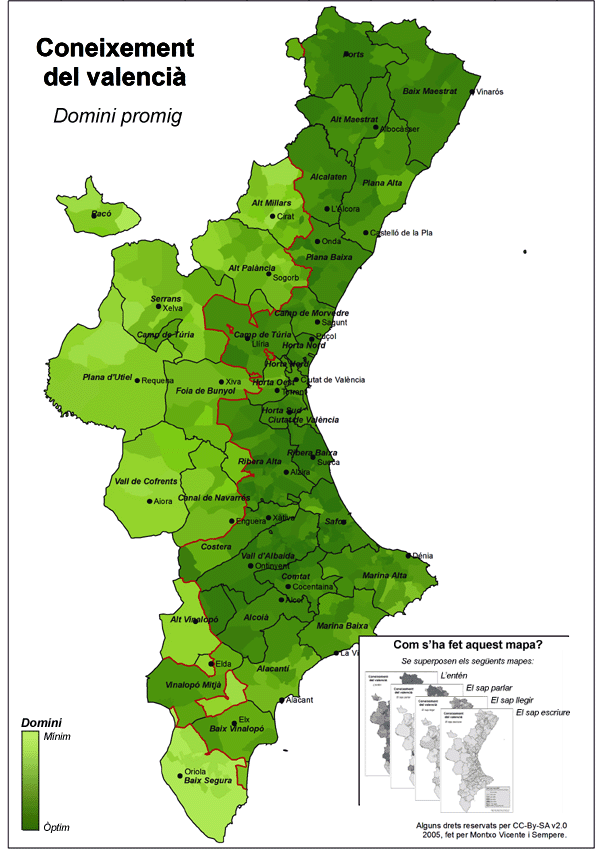
Knowledge of Valencian according to the 2001 census. The light green areas inland and in the southernmost part are not historically Valencian speaking (large).

In 2010 the Generalitat Valenciana, or Valencian government, published a study, Coneixement i ús social del valencià (Knowledge and Social Use of Valencian), which included a survey sampling more than 6,600 people in the provinces of Castellon, Valencia, and Alicante. The survey simply collected the answers of respondents and did not include any testing or verification. The results were:

- Valencian was the language "always, generally, or most commonly used":
  - at home: 31.6%
  - with friends: 28.0%
  - in internal business relations: 24.7%
- For ability:
  - 48.5% answered they can speak Valencian "perfectly" or "quite well" (54.3% in the Valencian-speaking areas and 10% in the Spanish-speaking areas)
  - 26.2% answered they can write Valencian "perfectly" or "quite well" (29.5% in the Valencian-speaking areas and 5.8% in the Spanish-speaking areas)

The survey shows that, although Valencian is still the common language in many areas in the Valencian Community, where slightly more than half of the Valencian population are able to speak it, most Valencians do not usually use Valencian in their social relations.

Moreover, according to the most recent survey in 2021, there is a downward trend in everyday Valencian users. The lowest numbers are in the major cities of Valencia and Alicante, where the percentage of everyday speakers is at single-digit numbers. However, the percentage of residents who claim to be able to understand and read Valencian seems to have increased since 2015.

Knowledge of Valencian in the Valencian Community (2021)
	Valencian-speaking zone	Spanish-speaking zone	Total
Understands it	79.4%	54%	75.8%
Can speak it	54.9%	24.2%	50.6%
Can read it	60.9%	35%	57.2%
Can write it	44.4%	19.5%	40.8%

Due to a number of political and social factors, including repression, immigration and lack of formal instruction in Valencian, the number of speakers has severely decreased, and the influence of Spanish has led to the appearance of a number of barbarisms.

== Features of Valencian ==
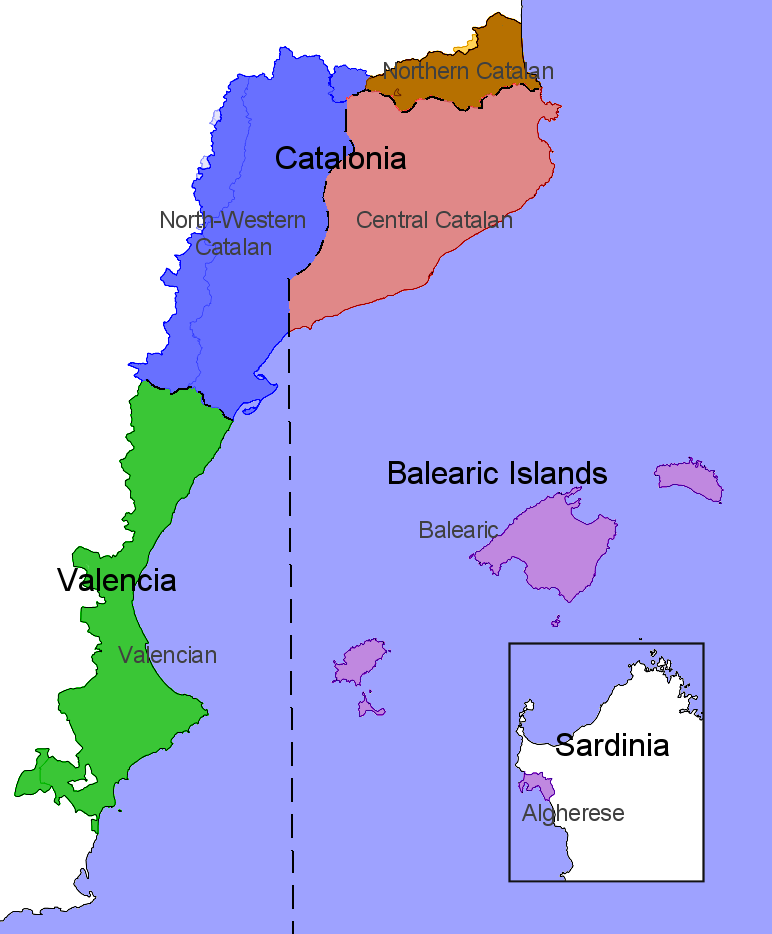
The main dialects of Catalan. The Western Catalan block comprises the two dialects of North-Western Catalan and Valencian.

This is a list of features of the main forms of Valencian. There is a great deal of variety within the Valencian Community, and by no means do the features below apply to every local version. For more general information about other linguistic varieties, see Catalan language.

The Acadèmia Valenciana de la Llengua (AVL) specifies Standard Valencian as having some specific syntax, vocabulary, verb conjugations and accent marks compared to Standard Catalan.

=== Phonology ===
==== Vowels ====
Vowels of Valencian, from Saborit Vilar 2009, p. 23

Vowels of Valencian
	Front	Back
Close (Note: The Valencian close vowels include close and close-mid vowels. Rare instances of mid vowels may also be found allophonically.)	i	u
Close	e	o
Open (Note: The Valencian open vowels are frequently called "double-open vowels" in Catalan Studies, and usually include near-open and/or open variants.)	ɛ	ɔ
Open	a	

Notes:

- The stressed vowel system of Valencian is the same as that of Eastern Catalan:
  - /a/, /e/, /ɛ/, /i/, /o/, /ɔ/, and /u/ (with /ɛ/ and /ɔ/ being considerably lower than in Central Catalan).

Close (and close-mid) vowels

- The vowels /i/ (pronounced like GA fr**ee**) and /u/ (like GA b**oo**t) are more open and centralised than in Spanish.
  - This effect is more pronounced in unstressed syllables, where the phones are best transcribed [ɪ, ʊ] (e.g., x**i**quet [t͡ʃɪˈket] 'boy').
    - (Due to the proximity of unstressed close and/or close-mid/mid vowels, non-standard colloquial Valencian may feature further lowerings producing vowel alterations or metathesis; e.g., piscina → *pescina 'pool').
- The vowel /e/ (pronounced like GA th**ey**, but without the final -y [ɪ] sounding) is somewhat retracted [e̠] and /o/ (like RP y**aw**n, but shorter) is somewhat advanced [o̟] both in stressed and unstressed syllables: m**e**tro [ˈme̠tɾö] ('subway/underground', also a colloquial substitution for metre 'meter'). Note this is mostly ignored in most transcriptions.
  - /e/- and /o/-centralisation can be more noticeable in unstressed position ([ë, ö]).
  - /e/ and /o/ can be realised as mid vowels [e̞, o̞] in some cases. This occurs more often with /o/ (e.g., am**o**r [ɐˈmo̞ɾ] 'love'). (For simplicity, this is ignored in most transcriptions).

Open vowels

- The so-called "open vowels" (i.e., near-open), /ɛ/ and /ɔ/, are generally as low as /a/ in most Valencian dialects. The phonetic realisations of /ɛ/ approaches [æ] (similar to GA l**a**d) and /ɔ/ is nearly as open as [ɒ] (as in traditional RP d**o**g). This feature is also found in Balearic. For a list showing the frequency of these vowels, see cases where /ɛ/ and /ɔ/ are found in Valencian.
  - /ɛ/ is slightly more open and centralised [æ̠] before liquids /l, ɾ, r/ (e.g., univ**e**rs [ʊnɪˈvæ̠ɾs] 'universe') and in monosyllabics (s**e**t [ˈsæ̠t] 'seven').
  - /ɔ/ is most often a back vowel (s**o**c [ˈsɒ̝k] 'clog', b**o**u [ˈbɒ̝w] 'bull').
    - In some dialects (including Balearic) /ɔ/ can be unrounded ([ˈsɑ̝k], [ˈbɑ̝w]).
- The vowel /a/ is slightly more fronted and closed than in Central Eastern Catalan (but less fronted and closed than in Majorcan). The precise phonetic realisation of the vowel /a/ in Valencian is [ɐ ~ ä] (sounding similar to n**u**t or f**a**ther in many English dialects), this vowel is subject to assimilation in many instances.
  - Stressed /a/ can be retracted to [ɑ] in contact with velar consonants (including the velarised [ɫ]): p**a**l [ˈpɑɫ] ('stick'); and fronted to [a] in contact with palatals: ny**a**p [ˈɲap] ('botched job').
    - The palatal pronunciation of /a/ may merge with /ɛ/ by some speakers: r**a**ig [ˈræt͡ʃ] ('ray').

Vowel reduction

- There are five general unstressed vowels /a, e, i, o, u/ (rare instances of /ɛ/ and /ɔ/ are found through compounding and vowel harmony). Although unstressed vowels are more stable than in Eastern dialects, there are many cases where they merge (see also, vowel reduction in Valencian):
  - /a/: final unstressed /a/ may have the following values: [ɛ̞̈ ~ ɔ̞̈ ~ ä̝] (phonetically fairly close to [ɜ ~ ɞ ~ ɐ], and traditionally transcribed without diacritics and/or atypical characters: /ɛ, ɔ, a/ for simplicity), depending on the preceding sounds and/or dialect (see "vowel harmony" below).
    - In some regions of the Valencian Community (especially Southern Valencian) unstressed /a/ followed by stressed /i/ becomes [ə]: r**a**ïm [rəˈim] ('grape'). Beltran i Calvo (2000) states, that final /a/ is close to [ə] in some towns of Marina Alta: xic**a** [ˈt͡ʃikə] ('girl').
  - /e/: unstressed /e/ and /ɛ/ may be realised as [ɐ], [a], [ɑ], etc. (depending on the following or preceding sounds) in initial position in contact with sibilants, nasals and, sometimes, in some environments before any consonant (e.g., **e**scoltar [ɐskoɫ̪ˈtäɾ] 'to listen').
    - Similarly (although not recommended by the AVL), unstressed /e/ and /ɛ/ merges with /i/ (phonetically [ɪ]) in contact with palatal consonants (e.g., g**e**noll [d͡ʒɪˈnoʎ] 'knee'), and especially (in this case it is accepted) in lexical derivation with the suffix -ix**e**ment (e.g., naix**e**ment [nɐjʃɪˈmen̪t] 'birth'). Rarely initial es- can become [ɪs-]; e.g., estiu [ɪsˈtiw] ('summer'), and it may alternate with the more frequently sequence [ɐs-] (and sometimes also [es-]): [ɐsˈtiw].
      - In the standard (/e/ → /i/ [ɪ]) is only accepted in words with the suffix -ixement.
  - /i/: it is more open and centralised [ɪ] in unstressed position.
  - /o/: unstressed /o/ and /ɔ/ may be realised as [ʊ] (/u/) before labial consonants (e.g., c**o**berts [kʊˈbɛ̞ɾt] 'covered', 'cutlery'), before a stressed syllable with a high vowel (e.g., s**o**spira [sʊsˈpiɾɐ] 'he/she sighs') and in some given names (e.g., J**o**sep [d͡ʒʊˈzɛp] 'Joseph').
    - Note in some colloquial speeches initial unstressed /o/ can diphthongise to /aw/ [ɑw] (phonetically [ɐw]); e.g., **o**lor [ɐwˈɫoɾ]) 'smell (n.)'. This is regarded as non-standard.
  - /u/: it is more open and centralised [ʊ] in unstressed position.

Vowel harmony

- Many Valencian dialects feature some sort of vowel harmony (harmonia vocàlica). This process is normally progressive (i.e., preceding vowels affect those pronounced afterwards) over the last unstressed vowel of a word (note that the unstressed vowels produced by vowel harmony can be centralised: [ɛ̞̈] and/or [ɔ̞̈]. Diacritics are ignored outside of this section); e.g., t**e**l**a** /ˈtɛla/ > [ˈtɛ̞lɛ̞̈] 'cloth', 'fabric', h**o**r**a** /ˈɔɾa/ > [ˈɔ̞ɾɔ̞̈] 'hour'. However (although regarded as non-standard), there are cases where regressive metaphony occurs over pretonic vowels; e.g., **a**f**e**ct**a** /aˈfɛkta/ > [ɛ̞̈ˈfɛ̞ktɛ̞̈] 'affects', t**o**v**a**ll**o**l**a** /tovaˈʎɔla/ > [tɔ̞̈vɔ̞̈ˈʎɔ̞lɔ̞̈] 'towel'. For an in-depth explanation of this phenomenon see Valencian vowel harmony.
  - Vowel harmony differs greatly from dialect to dialect, while many varieties assimilate both to the height and the quality of the preceding stressed vowel (e.g., terra [ˈtɛ̞rɛ̞̈] 'Earth, land' and dona [ˈdɔ̞nɔ̞̈] 'woman'); in other varieties, it is just the height that assimilates, so that terra and dona can be realised with either /ɛ/ ([ˈtɛ̞rɛ̞̈] and/or [ˈdɔ̞nɛ̞̈]) or with /ɔ/ ([ˈtɛ̞rɔ̞̈] and/or [ˈdɔ̞nɔ̞̈]), depending on the region and speaker.
    - In some subvarieties the unstressed vowels produced by vowel harmony may actually be higher than the stressed ones and/or without a marked centralisation (e.g., port**a** [ˈpɔɾtɔ̝] 'door').
- In a wider sense, vowel assimilations can occur in further instances (that is all or most instances of final unstressed /а/, regardless of the preceding sounds and involving palatalisation and/or velarisation): xic**a** [ˈt͡ʃikɛ̞̈] or [ˈt͡ʃikɔ̞̈] ('girl'). This is considered non-standard.

Elision and diphthongisation

- In certain cases, unstressed /a/ and /e/ become silent when followed or preceded by a stressed vowel:
  - Unstressed /a/: quin**a** hora és? [ˌkin‿ˈɔ̞ɾɔ̞ ˈes] or [ˌkin‿ˈɔ̞ɾɐ ˈes] ('what time is it?').
  - Unstressed /e/: est**e** home [ˌest‿ˈɔ̞me] ('this man').
- Valencian has many diphthongs with /i/ [j] and /u/ [w] (see also "semivowels"). Diphthongs can be falling (or decreasing), which glide from a higher or more prominent vowel to a lower or less prominent one (e.g., her**oi** [eˈɾɔ̞j] 'hero'); or raising (or ascending), which move from a lower vowel sound to a higher one (e.g., **io**de [ˈjɔ̞ðe] 'iodine').
  - Occasionally, /e/ and /o/ may become syllabic and form diphthongs (synaloepha); e.g., ja h**e**m parlat d'açò [ˈja (e̯)m pɐɾˈɫɑd‿dɐˈsɔ̞] ('we already talked about this') and allà **o**n vulgues [ɐˈʎa o̯ɱ ˈvuɫɡes] ('there where you want'). Standard non-syllabic forms with /i/ and /u/ also diphthongise in colloquial Valencian (e.g., Valènc**i**a, standard /vaˈlensia/ vs. colloquial [vɐˈɫensjɐ] 'Valencia').
  - In some accents, vowels occurring at the end of a prosodic unit may be realised as centring diphthongs for special emphasis, so that Eh tu! Vine ací 'Hey you (s.)! Come here!' may be pronounced [ˈe ˈtuə̯ ˈvin(e) ɐ̯ˈsiə̯]. The non-syllabic [ɐ̯] is unrelated to this phenomenon as it is an unstressed non-syllabic allophone of /a/ that occurs after vowels, much like in Spanish.

Other sound changes

Vowel nasalisation

- All vowels are phonetically nasalised between nasal consonants or when preceding a syllable-final nasal (e.g., dium**e**nge [dɪwˈmẽɲd͡ʒe], colloquial [dʊˈmẽɲd͡ʒe] 'Sunday'). Transcription of nasalisation is usually omitted for simplification.

Vowel coalescence and lengthening

- The linguistic phenomenon where two tonic (stressed) vowels or adjacent vowel sounds fuse into a single sound is found in Valencian: qu**è** h**a**s fet? ('what have you done?') is pronounced [ˌkas ˈfet].
- Vowels can be lengthened in some contexts (e.g., c**oo**rdinació [koːɾðɪnɐsɪˈo] 'coordination').

Main vocalic allophones
Phoneme	Allophone	Usage	Example	English
/a/
/a/	[ä] ~ [ɐ]	Found in most instances	m**à**	hand
/a/	[a]	Before/after palatals, may be higher [æ] (both in stressed and unstressed position)	ny**a**p	botched job
/a/	[ã]	Same than [a], but followed by a nasal; may be higher [æ̃] (both in stressed and unstressed position)	ll**a**mp	lightning
/a/	[ɑ]	Before/after velars, usually higher in unstressed position [ʌ]	po**a**l	bucket
/a/	[ɑ̃]	Same than [ɑ], but followed by a nasal; usually higher in unstressed position [ʌ̃]	s**a**ng	blood
/a/	[ɐ]	In unstressed position	**a**bans	before
/a/	[ɐ̃]	Nasal [ɐ]; that is, [ɐ] followed by or in between nasals	ll**a**nçat	thrown
/a/	[e]	Found in the suffix -ista, in masculine only	artist**a**	artist (m.)
/a/	[ɛ̞̈] ~ [ɔ̞̈]	Final unstressed syllables (vowel harmony), may be higher ([ɛ̈] ~ [ɔ̈]) in some subvarieties; (Note these vowels are somewhat centralised due to their unstressed (Note: See also vowel reduction.) nature)	terr**a** / don**a**	Earth, land; woman
/a/	∅	Silent. In unstressed position, when followed or preceded by a stressed vowel	un**a** hora	one hour
/ɛ/
/ɛ/	[æ̠]	Before liquids and in monosyllabic terms	s**e**t	seven
/ɛ/	[æ̠̃]	Before nasals	d**e**ns	dense
/ɛ/	[ɛ̞]	Rest of cases, may be higher [ɛ] in some subvarieties	t**e**si	thesis
/e/
/e/	[e]	Found in stressed and unstressed syllables, may be lower [e̞]	s**e**c	dry
/e/	[ẽ]	In stressed and unstressed position followed by or in between nasals, may be lower [ẽ̞]	l**e**nt	slow
/e/	[a]	In some cases, in initial unstressed position before palatals; may be higher [æ]	**e**ixam	swarm
/e/	[ɐ]	In some cases, in unstressed position	t**e**rròs	clod (of earth), lump
/e/	[ɐ̃]	In some cases, in initial unstressed position before nasals (except velar nasals)	**e**ntén	he/she understands
/e/	[ɑ]	In some cases, in unstressed position in contact with velars; may be higher [ʌ]	cl**e**vill	crevice
/e/	[ɑ̃]	In some cases, in initial unstressed position before velar nasals; may be higher [ʌ̃]	**e**nclusa	anvil
/e/	[ɪ] (Note: In colloquial speech, /e/ is reduced to [i] (phon. [ɪ]) in further cases in contact with any palatal; e.g., genoll [dʒɪˈnoʎ] ('knee'). In some dialects initial es- [ɐs-] can alternate with [ɪs-]; e.g., estiu [ɪsˈtiw] ('summer').)	Found in the suffix -ixement	naix**e**ment	birth
/e/	∅	Silent. In unstressed position, when followed or preceded by a stressed vowel	mà **e**squerra	left hand
/i/
/i/	[i]	Especially found in stressed syllables	s**i**s	six
/i/	[ĩ]	Nasal [i]; that is, [i] followed by or in between nasals	d**i**ns	in, within, inside
/i/	[ɪ]	Unstressed position	x**i**quet	boy
/i/	[ɪ̃]	Nasal [ɪ]; that is, [ɪ] followed by or in between nasals	m**i**nvar	to decrease, wane
/i/	[j]	Unstressed position before/after vowels	**i**ogurt	yoghurt
/i/	∅	Silent. In the digraph ⟨ig⟩ /t͡ʃ/, and dialectally also in the digraph ⟨ix⟩ (Note: In colloquial speech, the combination e + ix is pronounced [iʃ] (phon. [ɪʃ]); e.g., eixida [ɪˈʃiðɐ] ('exit').)	ra**i**g	ray
/ɔ/
/ɔ/	[ɒ̝]	Found before stops and in monosyllabic terms	r**o**ig	red
/ɔ/	[ɒ̝̃]	Before nasals	p**o**nt	bridge
/ɔ/	[ɔ̞]	Rest of cases, may be higher [ɔ] in some subvarieties	d**o**na	woman
/o/
/o/	[o]	Found in stressed and unstressed syllables	m**o**lt	much, very
/o/	[õ]	Nasal [o]; that is, [o] followed by or in between nasals	**o**n	where
/o/	[o̞]	Found in the suffix -dor and in coda stressed syllables	canç**ó**	song
/o/	[ʊ]	Unstressed position before labials, a syllable with a high vowel and in some given names	J**o**sep	Joseph
/o/	[ʊ̃]	Same as [ʊ], but followed by a nasal	c**o**mplit	to fulfill
/o/	[ew] (Note: In colloquial speech, many instances of initial /o/ are pronounced [ɑw] (phon. [ɐw]); e.g., olor [ɐwˈɫoɾ] ('smell', [n.]).)	Found in most cases with the weak pronoun ho	h**o**	it
/u/
/u/	[u]	Especially found in stressed syllables	ll**u**ç	hake
/u/	[ũ]	Nasal [u]; that is, [u] followed by or in between nasals	f**u**m	smoke
/u/	[ʊ]	Unstressed position	s**u**car	to soak, dip
/u/	[ʊ̃]	Nasal [ʊ]; that is, [ʊ] followed by or in between nasals	m**u**ntó	a lot
/u/	[w]	Unstressed position before/after vowels	te**u**a	your (f.)
/u/	∅	Silent. After the velars /k/ and /ɡ/ in the digraphs ⟨qu⟩ and ⟨gu⟩	q**u**i	who

==== Consonants ====
Consonants of Valencian
		Labial		Dental/ Alveolar		Palatal		Velar	
Nasal			m		n		ɲ		(ŋ)
Plosive		p	b	t	d			k	ɡ
Affricate				t͡s	d͡z	t͡ʃ	d͡ʒ		
Fricative		f	v	s	z	ʃ	(ʒ)		
Approximant	Median						j		w
Approximant	Lateral				l		ʎ		
Rhotic	Tap				ɾ				
Rhotic	Trill				r				

Nasals

- /m/ is bilabial, except before /v/ and /f/ where it becomes labiodental [ɱ].
- /n/ is apical front alveolar [n̺], and laminal denti-alveolar [n̪] before /t/ and /d/.
  - In addition, /n/ is postalveolar [n̠] or alveolo-palatal [ɲ̟] before /d͡ʒ/, /t͡ʃ/, and /ʃ/; velar [ŋ] before /ɡ/ and /k/; and labiodental [ɱ] before /v/ and /f/, where it merges with /m/. It also merges with /m/ (to [m]) before /b/ and /p/.
- /ɲ/ is laminal front alveolo-palatal [ɲ̟].
- /ŋ/ is velar and is only found in the coda.

Obstruents

- Coda obstruents assimilate to the voicing of the following consonant (e.g., anè**c**dota [ɐˈnɛ̞ɡdotɐ] 'anecdote'). In the standard, coda fricatives also assimilate to the voicing of the following vowel: el**s** amics [eɫz‿ɐˈmiks] ('the friends'). In regular speech in some dialects (but not in the standard), final plosives may assimilate to the voicing of the following vowel (see "plosives").
  - Voiced obstruents undergo final-obstruent devoicing so that fre**d** ('cold' [m., s.]) is pronounced with [t] (or [d̥]) [ˈfɾet] while fre**d**es ('cold' [f., pl.]) is pronounced with [ð] [ˈfɾeðes]. (See also "plosives" and "affricates and fricatives").

Plosives

- /b/ and /p/ are bilabial.
  - /b/ is lenited to the approximant (or fricative) [β̞] (or [β]) in betacist dialects, after a continuant; i.e., a vowel or any type of consonant other than a stop or nasal (e.g., ca**b**ut [kɐˈβ̞ut] 'big head, stubborn' vs. can**v**i [ˈkämbɪ] 'change', standard without betacism: [kɐˈbut] and [ˈkäɱvɪ]).
  - Voiced contrast is lost word finally, so cu**b** ('cube') and cu**p** ('winepress') are both pronounced with final [p] (also represented as [b̥]).
    - Final /p/ may be lenited before a vowel: ca**p** estret [ˈkab‿esˈtɾet] or [ˈkaβ̞‿esˈtɾet] ('narrow head').
    - Final /p/ after nasals is preserved in most dialects: cam**p** [ˈkämp] ('field').
- /d/ and /t/ are laminal denti-alveolar [t̪] and [d̪]. After /s/ and /z/, they are laminal alveolar [t̻] and [d̻].
  - /d/ is lenited to the approximant (or fricative) [ð̞] (or [ð]), after a continuant; i.e., a vowel or any type of consonant other than a stop or nasal (exceptions include /d/ after lateral consonants): fa**d**es [ˈfäð̞es] 'fairies' vs. fal**d**es [ˈfɑɫ̪des] ('skirts').
    - /d/ [ð] is often elided between vowels following a stressed syllable (found notably in feminine participles, /ada/ → [aː] or [ɑː], and in the suffix -dor); e.g., fideuà [fɪðeˈwɑː] ( < fideua**d**a) 'fideuà', moca**d**or [mokɐˈoɾ] 'tissue' (note this feature, although widely spread in south Valencia, is not recommended in Standard Valencian, except for reborrowed terms such as Albà, Roà, the previously mentioned fideuà, etc.).
  - Voiced contrast is lost word finally, so sor**d** ('deaf') and sor**t** ('luck') are both pronounced with final [t] (also represented as [d̥]).
    - Final /t/ may be lenited before a vowel: to**t** açò [ˈtoð‿ɐˈsɔ̞] ('all this').
    - Final /t/ after nasals and laterals is preserved in most dialects: cen**t** [ˈsen̪t] ('hundred') and mol**t** [ˈmoɫ̪t] ('very').
- /ɡ/ and /k/ are velar.
  - /ɡ/ and /k/ are fronted to pre-velar position [ɟ̠, c̠] before front vowels: **qu**i [ˈc̠i] ('who'). This is not transcribed in broader transcriptions of Valencian.
  - /ɡ/ is lenited to the approximant (or fricative) [ɣ̞] (or [ɣ]) after a continuant; i.e., a vowel or any type of consonant other than a stop or nasal.
    - In some dialects, /ɡ/ may lenite [ɣ] in all environments (e.g., **g**at [ˈɣ̞ɑt]), except after nasal (an**g**oixa [ɑŋˈɡojʃɐ] 'anguish').
  - Voiced contrast is lost word finally, so re**g** ('irrigation') and re**c** ('irrigation ditch') are both pronounced with final [k] (also represented as [ɡ̥]).
    - Final /k/ may be lenited before a vowel: po**c** alt [ˈpɔ̞ɣ‿ˈɑɫ̪t] ('not very tall').
    - Final /k/ after nasals is preserved in most dialects: ban**c** [ˈbɑŋk] ('bank').

Affricates and fricatives

- /d͡z/ and /t͡s/ are apical alveolar [d͡z̺] and [t͡s̺]. They may be somewhat fronted, so that the stop component is laminal denti-alveolar, while the fricative component is apical post-dental (according to Hualde (1992), /t͡s/ and /d͡z/ can be retracted: [t̪͡s̠], [d̪͡z̠]). /t͡s/ is rare and may not be phonemic.
  - In the standard, intervocalic /d͡z/; e.g., se**tz**e ('sixteen'), and /t͡s/; e.g., po**ts**er ('maybe'), are recommended to be pronounced with a gemination of the stop element ([d͡ːz] and [t͡ːs], respectively. However this is not transcribed in standard transcriptions.
    - Note /d͡z/ is deaffricated to [z] in verbs ending in -itzar and derivatives: anali**tz**ar [ɐnɐlɪˈzäɾ] ('to analyse'), organi**tz**ació [oɾɣɐnɪzɐsɪˈo] ('organisation'). Also in words like bo**tz**ina [boˈzinɐ] ('horn'), hori**tz**ó [oɾɪˈzo] ('horizon') and maga**tz**em [mɐɣɐˈzem] ('storehouse') (cf. gui**tz**a [ˈɡid͡zɐ], 'kick' (from an animal)).
- /d͡ʒ/, /t͡ʃ/, ([ʒ]), and /ʃ/ are described as back alveolo-palatal, or postalveolar.
  - Valencian has preserved in most of its varieties the mediaeval voiced pre-palatal affricate /d͡ʒ/ (similar to the j in English "jeep") in contexts where other modern dialects have developed fricative consonants /ʒ/ (like the si in English "vision"); e.g., di**j**ous [dɪˈd͡ʒɔ̞ws] ('Thursday').
  - Note the fricative [ʒ] (and [jʒ]) appears only as a voiced allophone of /ʃ/ (and /jʃ/) before vowels and voiced consonants; e.g., pe**ix** al forn [ˈpejʒ ɐɫ ˈfoɾn] ('oven fish').
  - Unlike other Catalan dialects, /d͡ʒ/ and /t͡ʃ/ do not geminate (in most accents): me**tg**e [ˈmed͡ʒe] ('medic'), and co**tx**e [ˈkot͡ʃe] ('car'). Exceptions may include learned terms like pi**dg**in [ˈpid͡ːʒɪn] ('pidgin').
  - Final etymological /d͡ʒ/ is devoiced to [t͡ʃ]: lle**ig** [ˈʎet͡ʃ] ('ugly').
- /z/ and /s/ are apical back alveolar [z̺] and [s̺], also described as postalveolar ([z̠] and [s̠]).
  - In some dialects, /s/ is pronounced [ʃ] (or [s̠ʲ], often represented as ⟨ʂ⟩) after /i, j, ʎ, ɲ/. In the standard only is accepted after /i/ (in the inchoative form with /sk/ → [ʃk]), and after /ʎ, ɲ/: ell**s** [ˈeʎʃ] ('they'). In the latter case and in some variants the result may be an affricate.
  - Final /z/ is devoiced to [s] (also represented as [z̥]): brun**z** [ˈbɾuns] ('he/she buzzes').
- /v/ and /f/ are labiodental.
  - /v/ occurs in Balearic, Algherese, Standard Valencian (including Northern and Southern Valencian) and some areas in southern Catalonia (e.g., **v**iu [ˈviw], 'he/she lives'). It has merged with /b/ elsewhere.
    - /v/ is realised as an approximant [ʋ] after continuants: a**v**anç [ɐˈʋäns] ('advance'). This is not transcribed in this article.
    - Final /v/ is devoiced to [f] (also represented as [v̥]): sal**v** [ˈsɑɫf] ('save, except').

Liquids (rhotics and laterals)

- /l/ is apical front alveolar [l̺], and laminal denti-alveolar [l̪] (or velarised [ɫ̪]) before /t/ and /d/. (In addition, /l/ is postalveolar [l̠] or alveolo-palatal [ʎ̟] before /d͡ʒ/, /t͡ʃ/, and /ʃ/).
  - /l/ is normally velarised ([ɫ]), especially in the coda, before nasals or a stressed vowel.
    - /l/ is generally dropped in the word a**l**tre [ˈätɾe] ('other'), as well as in derived terms.
- /ʎ/ is laminal front alveolo-palatal [ʎ̟].
- /ɾ/ is apical front alveolar [ɾ̺] and /r/ is apical back alveolar [r̺], also described as postalveolar ([r̠]).
  - Between vowels, the two rhotics contrast (e.g., mi**r**a [ˈmiɾɐ] 'he/she looks' vs. mi**rr**a [ˈmirɐ] 'myrrh'), but they are otherwise in complementary distribution. [ɾ] appears in the onset, except in word-initial position (**r**uc 'donkey'), after /l/, /n/, and /s/ (fol**r**e 'lining', hon**r**a 'honour', and Is**r**ael 'Israel'), and in compounds (infra**r**oig 'infrared'), where [r] is used.
  - [ɹ] is a possible variant of the tap /ɾ/ in all post-vocalic contexts in Valencian: enca**r**a [ɑŋˈkɑɹɐ] ('yet, still'). [ɹ] can often be elided (e.g., [ɑŋˈkɑɹɐ] → [ɑŋˈkɑ]).
  - /ɾ/ (usually devoiced [ɾ̥]) is mostly retained in the coda (e.g., ana**r** [(ɐ)ˈnäɾ], 'to go'), except for some cases where it can be dropped: p**r**endre [ˈpendɾe] ('to take'), a**r**bre [ˈäbɾe] ('tree'), and dine**r**s [dɪˈnes] ('money').
    - In some dialects /ɾ/ can be further dropped in combinatory forms with infinitives and pronouns (ana**r**-me'n [(ɐ)ˈnä.men] 'to go away, leave').
    - In other dialects, further instances of final /ɾ/ (like nouns and/or infinitives, regardless of combinatory forms with pronouns) are lost: ana**r** [(ɐ)ˈnä] ('to go').

Semivowels

- The vowels /i/ and /u/ have as non-vocalic correlates the semivowels [j] and [w], respectively, which form a diphthong with the preceding or following vowel (e.g., h**i**ena [ˈjenɐ] 'hyena', fe**i**a [ˈfejɐ] 'I or he/she was doing', me**u**a [ˈmewɐ] 'mine', pasq**u**a [ˈpäskwɐ] 'Easter').
  - According Wheeler (2005), the sequences [ɡw] or [kw] are regarded as labiovelar phonemes /ɡʷ/ and /kʷ/.

Valencian diphthongs
Falling
[aj]	**ai**gua	'water'	[aw] ([ɑw])	t**au**la	'table'
([ɐj]) (Note: Mainly found in unstressed syllables.)	**ai**rós	'graceful', 'windy'	([ɐw])	d**au**rat	'golden'
[ɛj]	ol**ei**c	'oleic'	[ɛw]	p**eu**	'foot'
[ej]	r**ei**	'king'	[ew]	s**eu**	'his/her'
[ij] ([iː])	ant**ii**matge	'anti-image'	[iw]	r**iu**	'river'
[ɔj]	her**oi**	'hero'	[ɔw] (Note: [ɔw] (phon. [ɒw]) may merge with [aw] (phon. [ɑw]) in Southern Valencian, thus ou ('egg') and au ('bird') sound the same.)	**ou**	'egg'
[oj] (Note: Mainly found as part of the digraph ⟨ix⟩ (i.e., o + ix), it merges with [o] in yod-dropping accents (including some Valencian dialects and most Eastern Catalan dialects), and with [uj] in unstressed position (e.g., Moisés/Moisès 'Moses'), in most Eastern Catalan dialects.)	F**oi**x	'Foix'	[ow]	s**ou**	'you (pl.) are'
[uj] (Note: Merges with [wi] in some dialects, in others it contrasts with [wi] hui ('today').)	b**ui**t	'empty'	[uw] ([uː])	d**uu**	'he/she carries'
Rising
[ja]	**ia**io	'grandpa'	[wa]	q**ua**tre	'four'
([jɐ])	sa**ia**	'sagum', 'tunic'	([wɐ])	Pasq**ua**	'Easter'
[jɛ]	A**ie**lo	'Aielo'	[wɛ]	seq**üè**ncia	'sequence'
[je]	ba**ie**s	'berries'	[we]	ung**üe**nt	'ointment'
			[wi]	ping**üí**	'penguin'
[jɔ]	**io**de	'iodine'	[wɔ]	q**uò**rum	'quorum'
[jo]	Fo**io**s	'Foios'	[wo]	q**uo**tidià	'daily', 'quotidian'
[ju]	**iu**goslau	'Yugoslav'			

Notes:

Clusters

Clusters may consist of a consonant plus a semivowel (C[j], C[w]) or an obstruent plus a liquid.

- Word-initial clusters from Graeco-Latin learned words tend to drop the first phoneme: **gn**om [ˈnom] ('gnome'), **mn**emotècnia [nemoˈtɛ̞ŋnɪɐ] ('mnemotechnical'), **pn**eumàtic [newˈmätɪk] ('pneumatic'), **ps**eudònim [sewˈðɔ̞nɪm] ('pseudonym'), **pt**erodàctil [teɾoˈðäktɪɫ] ('pterodactylus'), etc.
- Word-medial codas are restricted to one consonant + [s] (e.g., extra [ˈeks.tɾɐ] ('extra').
- In the coda position, voice contrasts among obstruents are neutralised (see "obstruents" above)..
  - The pronunciation of final /mp/, /nt/, /nk/ (e.g., ca**mp** 'field', pu**nt** 'point' and ba**nc** 'bank') is usually retained in the standard and most Valencian dialects, this includes plural forms (+ [s]): ca**mps** [ˈkämps], pu**nts** [ˈpun̪ts] and ba**ncs** [ˈbɑŋks]. Medial ⟨mp⟩ before consonant merges with /m/; e.g., co**mp**te ('account') and co**m**te ('count') are pronounced as [ˈkomte].
  - Other clusters include /lp/ (Ca**lp** 'Calp'), /lt/ (a**lt** 'high', 'tall'), /lk/ (ta**lc** 'talc'); /ɾp/ (se**rp** 'snake'), /ɾt/ (ce**rt** 'true', 'certain'), /ɾk/ (ma**rc** 'frame'); and /sp/ (cre**sp** 'curly'), /sk/ (ca**sc** 'helmet', /st/ (gu**st** 'taste').
    - The final clusters sc (/sk/), st (/st/), xt (/kst/) add -os to form plural (grammatical number) in the standard: cascos ('helmets'), gustos ('tastes'), and textos ('texts'). In some varieties the form without -o- is more frequently found (thus; cascs, gusts, and texts).

Metathesis

- In some places, some terms can undergo sound changes (such as metathesis), like cridar → *crid(r)ar or quid(r)ar ('to call'). This is heard frequently in the term aigua (standard) → àuia (colloquial) ('water').

=== Morphology ===
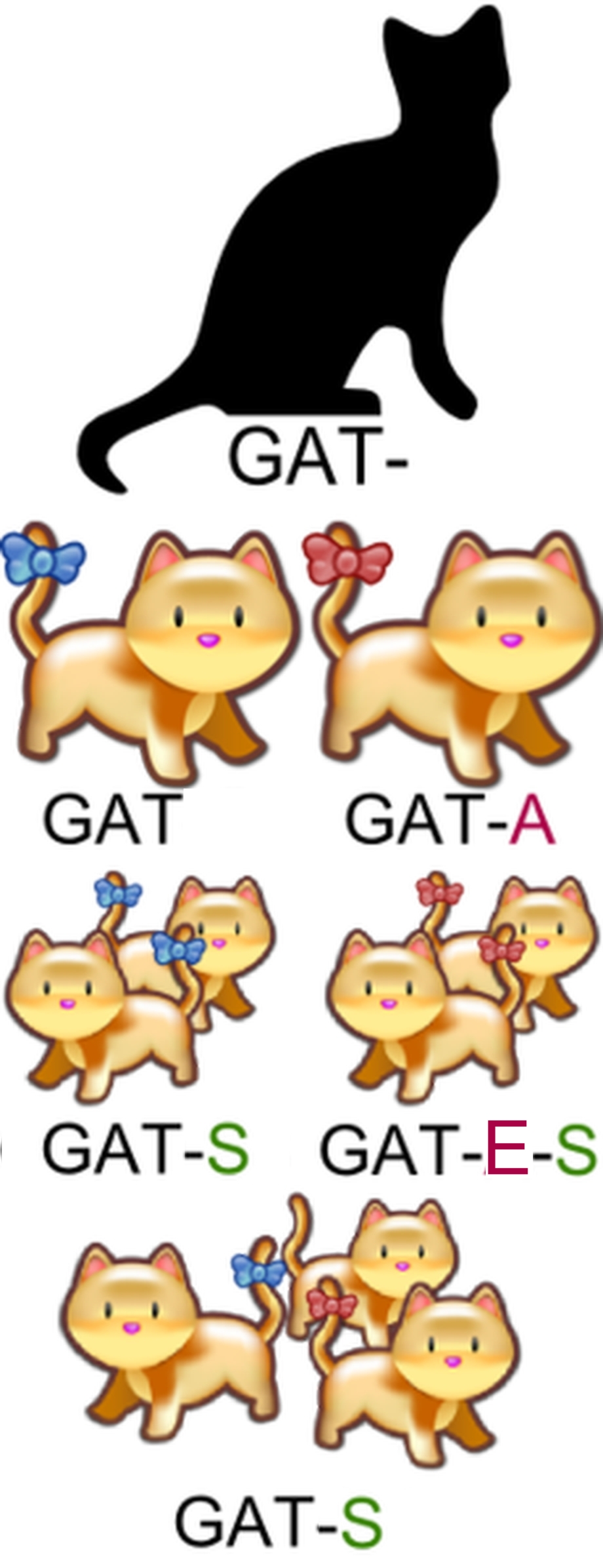
Gender and number inflection of the word gat ('cat')

- In gender inflection, the most notable feature is (compared to Portuguese, Spanish or Italian), the loss of the typical masculine suffix -o. Thus, the alternance of -o/-a, has been replaced by ø/-a (like the rest of Catalan varieties). There are only a few exceptions, such as nan**o**/nan**a** ('buddy, kiddo', 'dwarf'). Many not completely predictable morphological alternations may occur, such as:
  - Affrication: bo**ig**/bo**j**a ('insane') and lle**ig**/lle**tj**a ('ugly') - Unlike Standard Catalan, Valencian does not contrast certain fricatives with affricates (i.e., there is a tendency to favour affricates, although there are exceptions).
  - Loss of final nasals: pla/pla**n**a ('flat') vs. sego**n**/sego**n**a ('second').
  - Final obstruent devoicing: senti**t**/senti**d**a ('felt') vs. di**t**/di**t**a ('said').

Valencian has few suppletive couplets, like Italian and Spanish, and unlike French. Thus, Valencian has xic/xica ('boy'/'girl') and gall/gallina ('cock'/'hen'), whereas French has garçon/fille and coq/poule.

There is a tendency to abandon traditionally gender-invariable adjectives in favour of marked ones, something prevalent in Occitan and French. Thus, one can find bullent/bullenta ('boiling') in contrast with traditional bullent (for both masculine and feminine).

As in the other Western Romance languages, the main plural expression is the suffix -s, which may create morphological alternations similar to the ones found in gender inflection, albeit more rarely. The most important one is the addition of -o- before certain sibilants and consonant groups (e.g., after -ç: feliç/feliços 'happy'/'happies'; after -s: mes/mesos 'month'/'months', gos/gossos 'dog'/'dogs'; after -x: reflex/reflexos 'reflex'/'reflexes'; after -ig: roig/rojos 'red'/'reds', desig/desitjos 'wish'/'wishes'; after -ix: baix/baixos 'short'/'shorts'; after -tx: despatx/despatxos 'office'/'offices'; after -sc: disc/discos 'disc'/'discs'; after -st: cost/costos 'expenditure'/'expenditures'; and -xt: pretext/pretextos 'pretext'/'pretexts'), a phonetic phenomenon that does not affect feminine forms: el pols/els polsos ('the pulse'/'the pulses', both m. in Valencian) vs. la pols/les pols ('the dust'/'the dusts', both f. in Valencian).

- Note words ending in -o, such as nan**o** ('buddy, kiddo', 'dwarf'), ferr**o** ('iron'), puest**o** ('place' - instead of lloc, also 'place'), etc., are confined to recent loanwords and interferences, especially from Spanish.

- The present first-person singular of verbs (in indicative) differs from Central Catalan. All those forms without final -o are more akin to mediaeval Catalan and contemporary Balearic Catalan.

Comparison of present first-person singular with Central Catalan
Stem	Infinitive		Present first person singular				
Stem	Catalan	English	Valencian		Central		English
Stem	Catalan	English		IPA		IPA	English
-ar	parlar	to speak	parle	[ˈpäɾle]	parlo	[ˈpäɾɫu]	I speak
-re	batre	to beat	bat	[ˈbät]	bato	[ˈbätu]	I beat
-er	témer	to fear	tem	[ˈtem]	temo	[ˈtemu]	I fear
-ir	sentir	to feel	sent	[ˈsen̪t]	sento	[ˈsen̪tu]	I feel
-ir	sentir	to feel	senc (coll.)	[ˈseŋk]	sento	[ˈsen̪tu]	I feel
inchoative -ir	patir	to suffer	patisc (Note: Often colloquially spelled with ⟨xc⟩ (e.g., patixc).)	[pɐˈtisk]	pateixo	[pəˈtɛʃu]	I suffer
inchoative -ir	patir	to suffer	patisc	[pɐˈtiʃk]	pateixo	[pəˈtɛʃu]	I suffer

Notes:

- Present subjunctive is more akin to medieval Catalan and Spanish; -ar infinitives end ⟨e⟩, -re, -er and -ir verbs end in ⟨a⟩ (e.g., parl**e** 'I speak', from parlar 'to speak'; bat**a** 'I beat', from batre 'to beat'; tem**a** 'I fear', from témer 'to fear'; and sent**a** 'I feel', from sentir 'to feel' - inchoative -ir becomes patisc**a**). In contemporary Central Catalan present subjunctive ends in ⟨i⟩ (e.g., parl**i** 'I speak', bat**i** 'I beat', tem**i** 'I fear', and sent**i** 'I feel' - inchoative form pateix**i**).
- An exclusive feature of Valencian is the subjunctive imperfect morpheme with -r- (-ra, -res, -ra, -rem, -reu, -ren): que ell vingue**r**a ('that he might come'), instead of the forms with -s and -ss- from Catalonia and the Balearic Islands (e.g., que ell vingué**s**).
- Valencian has -i- as theme vowel for inchoative verbs of the third conjugation; e.g., pat**i**sc ('I suffer'), pat**i**xes ('you suffer'), pat**i**x ('he/she suffers'), like North-Western Catalan. Although, again, this cannot be generalised since there are Valencian dialects that utilise -ei-; e.g., pateixes ('you suffer') and pateix ('he/she suffers').
- In Valencian the simple past tense (e.g., cantà 'he sang'), used mainly around the city of Valencia and its metropolitan area, is more frequently used in speech than in Central Catalan, where the periphrastic past (e.g., va cantar 'he sang') is prevailing and the simple past mostly appears in written language. The same, however, may be said of the Balearic dialects.
- The second-person singular of the present tense of the verb ser ('to be'), ets ('you [s.] are'), has been replaced by eres in colloquial speech.
- The infinitive veure ('to see') has the variant vore, which belongs to more informal and spontaneous registers.
- The usage of the periphrasis of obligation tindre + que + infinitive is widely spread in colloquial Valencian, instead of the standard haver + de (equivalent to English "have to").
- In colloquial speech the first person [singular] of the verb haver 'to have' (he), found mainly in the present perfect tense (haver + past participle), has merged with the third person [singular] (ha). Thus, m'he comprat uns calcetins ('I have bought some socks') becomes m'ha comprat uns calcetins.
- Some speakers confuse the verb posar with ficar. In Standard Valencian, posar is equivalent to the Spanish poner ('to place one object on top of another'), while ficar is equivalent to the Spanish meter ('to place one object inside another'). The synonym coŀlocar ('to put, place') is also found in Valencian.
- The verb estar ('to be') is commonly substituted by ficar or clavar in expressions like, on t'has ficat? and a on et claves? ('where are you?').

Clitics

- In general, use of modern forms of the determinate article (el, els 'the') and the third-person unstressed object pronouns (el, els 'him, them'), though some dialects (for instance the one spoken in Vinaròs area) preserve etymological forms lo, los as in Lleida. For the other unstressed object pronouns, etymological old forms (me, te, se, ne, mos, vos...) can be found, depending on places, in conjunction with the more modern reinforced ones (em, et, es, en, ens, us...).
  - Several local variations for nosaltres ('we'), vosaltres ('you [pl.]'): mosatros, moatros, matros, etc. and vosatros, voatros, vatros, etc.; also for the weak form mos/-mos instead of standard ens/'ns/-nos ('us') and vos/-vos instead of us/-vos ('you [pl.]'), the latter (vos, instead of us) is considered standard.
- The adverbial pronoun hi ('there') is almost never used in speech and is replaced by other pronouns. The adverbial pronoun en ('him/her/them/it') is used less than in Catalonia and the Balearic Islands.
- Combined weak clitics with li ('him/her/it') preserve the li, whereas in Central Catalan it is replaced by hi. For example, the combination li + el gives li'l in Valencian (l'hi in Central Catalan).
- The weak pronoun ho ('it') is pronounced as:
  - [ew], when it forms syllable with a pronoun: m'ho dona [mew ˈðonɐ], dona-m'ho [ˈdonɐ.mew] ('he/she gives it to me')
  - [ew] or [u], when it comes before a verb starting with consonant: ho dona [ew ˈðonɐ] (or [u ˈðonɐ]) ('he/she gives it')
  - [w], when precedes a vowel or when coming after a vowel: li ho dona [liw ˈðonɐ] ('he/she gives it to her/him'), dona-ho [ˈdonɐw] ('you [s.] give it')
  - [o], when it comes after a consonant or a semivowel: donar-ho [doˈnäɾo] ('to give it').
- The personal pronoun jo ('I') and the adverb ja ('already') are not pronounced according to the spelling, but to the etymology ([ˈjo] / [jɔ] and [ˈja], instead of /ˈ(d)ʒo/ (or /ˈ(d)ʒɔ/) and /ˈ(d)ʒa/). Similar pronunciations can be heard in North-Western Catalan, colloquial Barcelonan and Ibizan.
- The preposition amb ('with') merges with en ('in') in most Valencian dialects.
- The compound preposition per a ('for') is usually reduced to p'a in colloquial Valencian.
- Valencian preserves the mediaeval system of demonstratives with three different levels of demonstrative precision (este or aquest/açò/ací, eixe or aqueix/això/ahí, aquell/allò/allí or allà, where aquest and aqueix are almost never used) (feature shared with modern Ribagorçan and Tortosan).
  - The colloquial variant of açò ('this'), astò, is heard frequently in Alacantí Valencian.

=== Vocabulary ===
Valencian vocabulary contains words both restricted to the Valencian-speaking domain, as well as words shared with other Catalan varieties, especially with North-Western ones. Words are rarely spread evenly over the Valencian Community, but are usually contained to parts of it, or spread out into other dialectal areas. Examples include hui 'today' (found in all of Valencia except transitional dialects, in Northern dialects avui) and espill 'mirror' (shared with North-Western dialects, Central Catalan mirall). There is also variation within Valencia, such as 'corn', which is dacsa in Central and Southern Valencian, but panís in Alicante and Northern Valencian (as well as in North-Western Catalan). Since Standard Valencian is based on the Southern dialect, words from this dialect are often used as primary forms in the standard language, despite other words traditionally being used in other Valencian dialects. Examples of this are tomaca 'tomato' (which is tomata outside of Southern Valencian) and matalaf 'mattress' (which is matalap in parts of Valencia, including the Southern Valencian area).

Written varieties (phonetics)
Valencian (AVL)	Catalan (IEC)	English
anglés	anglès	English
conéixer	conèixer	to know
traure	treure	take out
nàixer	néixer	to be born
cànter	càntir	pitcher
redó	rodó	round
meua	meva	my, mine
huit	vuit	eight
ametla	ametlla	almond
estrela	estrella	star
colp	cop	hit
llangosta	llagosta	lobster
hòmens	homes	men
servici	servei	service
orde	ordre	order

Below are a selection of words which differ or have different forms in Standard Valencian and Catalan. In many cases, both standards include this variation in their respective dictionaries, but differ as to what form is considered primary. In other cases, Valencian includes colloquial forms not present in the IEC standard. Primary forms in each standard are shown in bold (and may be more than one form). Words in brackets are present in the standard in question, but differ in meaning from how the cognate is used in the other standard.

Standard Valencian (AVL)	Standard Catalan (IEC)	English
**ací**, aquí	**aquí**, ací	here
**avi**, iaio, uelo	**avi**, iaio	grandpa
**així**, aixina	**així**	like this
**artista**; artiste, -a	**artista**	artist
**bou**, brau, toro	**toro**, bou, brau	bull
**brull**, brossat, mató	**mató**, brull, brossat	curd cheese
**bresquilla**, préssec	**préssec**, bresquilla	peach
**festa**, **comboi**	**festa**	fest (comboi may also mean 'commotion, chaos')
**corder**, xai, anyell	**xai**, corder, anyell	lamb
**creïlla**, patata	**patata**, creïlla	potato
**dacsa**, panís	**blat de moro**, panís	corn
**dènou**, dèneu, dinou	**dinou**, dènou	nineteen
**dos**, dues	**dues**, dos	two (f.)
**eixe**, **aqueix**	**aqueix**, eixe	that
**eixir**, sortir	**sortir**, eixir	to exit, leave
**engrunsador(a)**, gronxador(a)	**gronxador(a)**	swing
**espill**, mirall	**mirall**, espill	mirror
**este**, **aquest**	**aquest**, este	this
**fraula**, maduixa	**maduixa**, fraula	strawberry
**germà**, tete	**germà**	brother
**granera**, escombra	**escombra**, granera	broom
**hui**, avui	**avui**, hui	today
**llaurador**, pagés	**pagès**, laurador	farmer
**llepolia**	**llaminadura**, llepolia	sweet/candy
**lluny**, llunt	**lluny**	far
**matalaf**, matalap, matalàs	**matalàs**, matalaf	mattress
**melic**	**llombrígol**, melic	belly button
**meló d'Alger**, meló d'aigua, síndria	**síndria**, meló d'Alger, meló d'aigua	watermelon
**menut**, petit	**petit**, menut	small/little (menut may also mean 'small/little boy, child')
**mitat**, meitat	**meitat**, mitat	half
**nen**, **nano**	**nen**/**nin**, **nano**	small/little boy, child
**palometa**, papallona	**papallona**, palometa	butterfly
**palmito**, ventall	**ventall**	fan (hand-held device)
**paréixer**, semblar	**semblar**, parèixer	to seem
**pàrvul**, infant, minyó	**pàrvul**, **infant**, **minyó**	infant, child (minyó may also mean 'lad' and pàrvul 'preschooler')
**per favor**	**si us plau**, per favor	please
**poal**	**galleda**	bucket
**quint**, cinqué	**cinquè**, quint	fifth
**rabosa**, guineu	**guineu**, rabosa	fox
**roí(n)**, dolent	**dolent**, roí	bad, evil
**roig**, vermell	**vermell**, roig	red
**safanòria**, **carlota**	**pastanaga**, safanòria, carrota	carrot
**sext**, sisé	**sisè**, sext	sixth
**tenda**, botiga	**botiga**, tenda	shop/store
**tindre**, tenir	**tenir**, tindre	to have
**tomaca**, tomàquet, tomata	**tomàquet**, tomaca, tomata	tomato
**vacacions**, vacances	**vacances**, vacacions	holidays
**vesprada**	**tarda**	afternoon
**veure**, vore	**veure**	to see
**vindre**, venir	**venir**, vindre	to come
**xic**, **xicó**, **xicon**, **xiquet**	**noi**, xic	boy (also small/little boy, child)
**xic**, **xicó**, **xicon**, **xiquet**	**noiet**; xicó, xiquet	boy (also small/little boy, child)
**xicot**, ***nóvio**	**xicot**, ***nòvio**	boy, boyfriend
**xicotet**, **xicotiu**, etc.	**petitet**, **petitiu**, etc.	small/little
**xicotet**, **xicotiu**, etc.	**noiet**	small/little boy, child

== Writing system ==
Main forms	A a	B b	C c	D d	E e		F f	G g	H h	I i		J j	K k	L l	M m	N n	O o		P p	Q q	R r	S s	T t	U u		V v	W w	X x		Y y	Z z
Mod. forms	À à		Ç ç		É é	È è				Í í	Ï ï			ĿL ŀl			Ó ó	Ò ò						Ú ú	Ü ü						
IPA	/a/ (Note: In Valencian, final ⟨a⟩ in the masculine forms of the suffix -ista is pronounced [e] (e.g., artista 'artist', [masculine]). This is sometimes reflected in the orthography (artiste).)	/b/ (Note: Voiced stops /b, d, g/ become fricatives or approximants in syllable onsets, after continuants: /b/ → [β] (e.g., obert 'open'), /d/ → [ð] (e.g., fada 'fairy'), /ɡ/ → [ɣ] (e.g., segon 'second'). Exceptions include /d/ after lateral consonants and /b/ after the labiodental /f/. In /b/-/v/ distinguishing dialects (which includes the standard) /b/ fails to lenite.) (Note: The consonants and digraphs ⟨b, d, g, v / w, z, (i)g / j, tz⟩ /b, d, ɡ, v, z, d͡ʒ, d͡z/ become [p, t, k, f, s, t͡ʃ, t͡s] in final position (e.g., club, fred, reg, salv / Tomászow, brunz, mig / Raj, Hertz).)	/k/ (Note: Before central (/a/, including schwa in Catalan) and back vowels (/o, u/).) /s/ (Note: Before front vowels (/e, i/). Also before schwa [ə] in Catalan.)	/d/	/e/ (Note: In Valencian, initial ⟨e⟩ can merge with /a/, especially before nasals (e.g., enclusa 'anvil') or a sibilant (eixam 'swarm'). In other cases it can occur before any consonant (e.g., terròs 'clod (of earth)', 'lump').) (Note: In Valencian, ⟨e⟩ can merge with /i/ in the suffix -ixement (e.g., coneixement 'knowledge').)	/ɛ/	/f/	/ɡ/ (Note: ⟨g⟩ before nasals (e.g., the group ⟨gn⟩ /ɡn/) is often assimilated to [ŋ] in both Catalan and Valencian (e.g., sagna 'he/she bleeds').) /d͡ʒ/	∅ (Note: /h/ in loanwords (e.g., hawaià 'Hawaiian', hippy 'hippy') and interjections (ehem 'ahem').)	/i/ /j/ (Note: Before or after another vowel (also transcribed as /i̯/ and/or /u̯/).)		/d͡ʒ/ (Note: For etymological reasons, ⟨j⟩ is written before e /e/ in certain cases, such as jerarquia ('hierarchy'), jeroglífic ('hieroglyph'), jersei ('jersey'), jesuïta ('Jesuit'), majestat ('majesty'), etc., and before the groups -ecc- and -ect-: injecció ('injection'), objecte ('object'), etc. In fewer cases, and mainly in loanwords, ⟨j⟩ is also found before i /i/ (Beijing 'Beijing', fijià 'Fijian', Fuji 'Fuji', Jim 'Jim', etc.).) (Note: In Valencian, ⟨j⟩ is pronounced /j/ (yod) in terms like jo ('I') and ja ('already'). The Spanish ⟨j⟩ /x/ is found in loanwords like orujo ('grape liqueur') or La Rioja ('La Rioja').)	/k/	/l/	/m/	/n/	/o/ (Note: In Valencian, ⟨o⟩ sometimes merges with /u/, particularly before labials (e.g., cobert 'covered', 'cutlery') or a syllable with the vowel /i/ (sospira [susˈpiɾa] 'he/she sighs').)	/ɔ/	/p/	/k/	/r/ (Note: Initial ⟨r⟩ is pronounced /r/ (e.g., ros 'blond'); while intervocalic ⟨r⟩ is pronounced /ɾ/ (vora 'edge'), except in compounds (arítmia 'arrhythmia', pronounced with /r/).) /ɾ/	/s/ (Note: Initial ⟨s⟩ is pronounced /s/ (e.g., suc 'juice'); while intervocalic ⟨s⟩ is pronounced /z/ (cosa 'thing'), except in compounds (antesala 'antechamber', pronounced with /s/). Final ⟨s⟩ after the palatals /ɲ/ and /ʎ/; can be pronounced as a palatal fricative ([ʃ]) or affricate ([t͡ʃ]), voicing ([ʒ] or [d͡ʒ]) occurs if followed by a term starting with a vowel or a voiced consonant. For the final /t͡s/ (often analysed as /t/ + /s/) merger with /t͡ʃ/, see ⟨ts⟩. (Note: In Valencian initial ⟨ts⟩ (found only in loanwords; e.g., tsar 'tsar') is deaffricated. However, it may be pronounced in very formals registers. In some accents in final position, ⟨ts⟩ can merge with /t͡ʃ/ in certain cases and speeches (⟨tx⟩, ⟨x⟩ and ⟨ig⟩); e.g., tots ('all', 'everyone').)) /z/	/t/	/u/ /w/ (Note: After [ɡ] or [k] (often analysed as labiovelar consonants /ɡʷ/ and /kʷ/).)		/v/	/w/ /v/	/ks/ (Note: The ⟨x⟩ /ks/ pronunciation is found between vowels (e.g., màxim 'maximum'), between a vowel and voiceless consonant (extens 'extensive') and word finally, after a vowel (annex 'annexe') or consonant (larinx 'larynx'). The letter ⟨x⟩ is pronounced /ɡz/ in the initial groups ex- and inex- followed by vowel, ⟨h⟩ or a voiced consonant (examen 'exam', exhortar 'to exhort', exdiputat 'ex-deputy', inexorable 'inexorable').) /ɡz/	/t͡ʃ/ (Note: In Valencian, ⟨x⟩ is usually pronounced /ʃ/ after the high vocoid /i/ ⟨i⟩ (e.g., ix 'he/she goes out', pixar 'to pee', exceptions include learned terms: fixar 'to fix' and prolix 'prolix', pronounced with /ks/), in proper names or place names like Xàtiva 'Xàtiva' (often mispronounced with an epenthetic ei-) and learned terms like xenofòbia ('xenophobia') and xerografia ('xerography'). In other cases it alternates with /t͡ʃ/: xarop ('syrup'), or it is only pronounced /t͡ʃ/ (xiular 'to whistle', xinxa 'bedbug'). Note also final ⟨x⟩ /ʃ/ is voiced to [ʒ] before vowels and voiced consonants (e.g., ix ara 'he/she goes out now').) /ʃ/	/j/ /i/	/z/

Valencian and Catalan use the Latin script, with some added symbols and digraphs. The Catalan-Valencian orthographies are systematic and largely phonologically based. Standardisation of Catalan was among the topics discussed during the First International Congress of the Catalan Language, held in Barcelona October 1906. Subsequently, the Philological Section of the Institut d'Estudis Catalans (IEC), founded in 1911, published the Normes ortogràfiques in 1913 under the direction of Antoni Maria Alcover and Pompeu Fabra. In 1932, Valencian writers and intellectuals gathered in Castelló de la Plana to make a formal adoption of the so-called Normes de Castelló (Castelló Norms), a set of guidelines following Pompeu Fabra's Catalan language norms.

The letters k, y and w only appear in loanwords. In the case of y it also appears in the digraph ny. Most of the letters are pronounced the same in both standards (Valencian and Catalan). The letters c and g have a soft and hard pronunciation similar to English and other Romance languages, ç (found also in Portuguese and French) always has a soft pronunciation and may appear in word final position. The only differences between the main standards are the contrast of b /b/ and v /v/ (also found in Insular Catalan), the treatment of long consonants with a tendency to simplification in Valencian (see table with main digraphs and letter combinations), the affrication (/d͡ʒ/) of both soft g (after front vowels) and j (in most cases), the affrication (/t͡ʃ/) of initial and postconsonantal x (except in some cases) and the lenition (deaffrication) of tz /d͡z/ in most instances (especially the -itzar suffix and derivations).

Main digraphs and letter combinations
Spelling	IPA		Example	Meaning
Spelling	Catalan	Valencian	Example	Meaning
gu (Note: Before the vowels /a, o/ (spelled ⟨a⟩ and ⟨o⟩) it is pronounced /ɡw/ and /qw/ (e.g., guants 'gloves', quota 'share', 'fee').)	/ɡ/		àguila	eagle
ig (Note: Only found in the syllable coda.)	/t͡ʃ/		raig	ray
ix (Note: In some Valencian dialects (as well as Standard Catalan) the yod in the digraph ⟨ix⟩ /jʃ/ → /ʃ/ is dropped (e.g., peix [ˈpeʃ] 'fish'). The general (Valencian) pronunciation retains /j/ ([ˈpejʃ]). Before vowels and voiced consonants, the ⟨ix⟩ digraph /jʃ/ (or (/ʃ/) is voiced to [(j)ʒ] (peix blau 'blue fish').)	/ʃ/	/jʃ/	eixida	exit
ll (Note: In any position.)	/ʎ/		brollar	to sprout
ŀl (Note: "In Valencian ⟨ŀl⟩ is only geminated in very formal registers. In Catalan it is geminated in careful speech.)	/lː/ or /l/	/l/	coŀlegi	school, college
ny	/ɲ/		senyal	signal
qu	/k/		què	what
rr (Note: Only found between vowels.)	/r/		garra	shank, claw
sc	/s/		ascens	rise
ss (Note: Also found after consonant (e.g., qualssevol 'any, whichever' [pl.]).)	/s/		bossa	bag, purse
tg	/d͡ʒ/		fetge	liver
tj	/d͡ʒ/		viatjar	to travel
tl (Note: In Valencian ⟨tl⟩ and ⟨tn⟩ can be pronounced with gemination or not, ⟨tm⟩ and ⟨tll⟩ are only geminated in very formal registers. In Catalan ⟨tl⟩, ⟨tll⟩, ⟨tm⟩ and ⟨tn⟩ are geminated in careful speech.)	/lː/	/l/ or /lː/	Betlem	Bethlehem
tll	/ʎː/	/ʎ/	bitllet	bank note, ticket
tm	/mː/	/m/	setmana	week
tn	/nː/	/n/ or /nː/	cotna	pork rind
ts	/t͡s/		tots	all, everyone
tx	/t͡ʃ/		cotxe	car
tz (Note: In Valencian ⟨tz⟩ is deaffricated ([z]) in many instances, notably the suffix -itzar and derivations.)	/d͡z/	/d͡z/	setze	sixteen
tz	/d͡z/	/z/	analitzar	to analyse
Other letter combinations (foreign and/or old style)
Spelling	IPA		Example	Meaning
Spelling	Catalan	Valencian	Example	Meaning
ch (Note: The group ⟨ch⟩ is pronounced /x/ in loanwords, like modern Germanisms (e.g., Bach 'Bach'), and /ʃ/ (or /tʃ/) in Gallicisms (e.g., chardonnay 'Chardonnay'). In native words (pre-reformed spelling) it is pronounced /k/ (e.g., Folch 'Folch').)	/k/		Folch	Folch
ch	/x/		Bach	Bach
kh	/x/		Txékhov	Chekhov
ph (Note: The group ⟨ph⟩ is pronounced /p/ in native words (e.g., caphuitada 'octave day').)	/f/		pholis	pholis
th (Note: The group ⟨th⟩ is pronounced /t/ in native words (e.g., tothom 'everybody').)	/θ/		theta	theta

Diacritics (Note: The acute (´) and grave (`) accents indicate stress and vowel height.) (Note: The diaeresis (¨) is used to indicate a vowel hiatus or a non-silent /u/ after ⟨g⟩ or ⟨q⟩.)
Spelling	IPA	Example	Meaning
à	/a/	butà	butane
Spelling	IPA	Example	Meaning
é	/e/	més	more
è	/ɛ/	rètol	sign, label
Spelling	IPA	Example	Meaning
ó	/o/	emoció	emotion
ò	/ɔ/	òbila	barn owl
Spelling	IPA	Example	Meaning
í	/i/	físic	physical
ï	/i/	ruïna	ruin
Spelling	IPA	Example	Meaning
ú	/u/	dejú	fasting
ü	/u/	peüc	bootee
ü	/w/	aigües	waters

C trencada
Spelling	IPA	Example	Meaning
ç (Note: Before central (/a/, including schwa in Catalan) and back vowels (/o, u/), also after any vowels in the coda.)	/s/	braç	arm

Other combinations include:

- Double consonants like ⟨bb⟩ /bː/ (e.g., subbètic 'Subbaetic') and /b/ (hobby 'hobby'); ⟨cc⟩ /ks/ (acció 'action'); ⟨dd⟩ /dː/ (adduir 'to offer') and /d/ (Eddie 'Eddie'); ⟨ff⟩ /f/ (office 'office'); ⟨gg⟩ /d͡ʒ/ (suggerir 'to suggest'), /ɡː/ (burggravi 'burgrave'), and /ɡ/ (ziggurat 'ziggurat'); ⟨ll⟩ /lː/ (allegro 'allegro') and /l/ (ballet 'ballet'); ⟨mm⟩ /mː/ (immens 'huge') and /m/ (Jimmy 'Jimmy'); ⟨nn⟩ /nː/ (innat 'innate') and /n/ (Anne 'Anne'); ⟨pp⟩ /pː/ (cappare 'main shoot' [botany]) and /p/ (hippy 'hippy'); ⟨tt⟩ /tː/ (posttònic 'posttonic') and /t/ (dittografia 'dittography'); ⟨zz⟩ /d͡z/ (mezzo 'mezzo'), /t͡s/ (pizza 'pizza'), /z/ (jacuzzi 'jacuzzi'), and /s/ (jazz 'jazz').
- Some consonant groups in syllabic opening like ⟨bd⟩ /d/, ⟨cn⟩ /n/, ⟨ct⟩ /t/, ⟨ft⟩ /t/, ⟨gn⟩ /n/, ⟨mn⟩ /n/, ⟨pn⟩ /n/, ⟨ps⟩ /s/, ⟨pt⟩ /t/ or ⟨tm⟩ /m/, found in learned words (e.g., bdeŀli 'bdellium', Cnossos 'Knossos', ctenòfors 'ctenophora', ftàlic 'phthalic', gnòstic 'gnostic', mnemotècnic 'mnemotechnics', pneumònia 'pneumonia', psíquic 'psychic', metempsicosi 'metempsychosis', psalm 'psalm', pterodàctil 'pterodactylus', Ptolemeu 'Ptolemy', tmesi 'tmesis').
- The graphic groups specific to other languages (see also double consonants) present in most non-adapted borrowings and in derivatives of foreign proper names (e.g., apartheid with /th/ 'apartheid', au-pair with /ɛ/ 'au pair', chardonnay with /ʃ/ or /t͡ʃ/ 'chardonnay', cognac with /ɲ/ 'cognac', Coelho (Note: The group ⟨lh⟩ is pronounced /l/ in native words (e.g., alhora 'together', 'at the same time').) with /ʎ/ 'Coelho', Dolzhenko (Note: The group ⟨zh⟩ is pronounced /z/ in learned words like alzhèimer ('Alzheimer's disease').) with /ʒ/ 'Dolzhenko', edelweiss with /s/ 'edelweiss', freelance with /i/ 'freelance', jazz with /s/ 'jazz', kirsch with /ʃ/ 'kirsch', leishmaniosi with /ʃ/ [ʒ] 'leishmaniasis, Luisinho (Note: The group ⟨nh⟩ is pronounced /n/ in native words (e.g., anhel 'yearning').) with /ɲ/ 'Luisinho', mousse with /u/ 'mousse', Philip with /f/ 'Philip', pizza with /t͡s/ 'pizza', playback with /k/ 'playback', shakespearià (Note: The group ⟨sh⟩ is pronounced /z/ in native words (e.g., aleshores 'then').) with /ʃ/ 'Shakespearean', zoom with /u/ 'zoom', etc.).

== Varieties of Valencian ==
=== Standard Valencian ===
The Valencian Academy of the Language (Acadèmia Valenciana de la Llengua, AVL), established by law in 1998 by the Valencian autonomous government and constituted in 2001, is in charge of dictating the official rules governing the use of Valencian. Currently, the majority of people who write in Valencian use this standard.

Standard Valencian is based on the standard of the Institute of Catalan Studies (Institut d'Estudis Catalans, IEC), used in Catalonia, with a few adaptations. This standard roughly follows the Norms of Castelló (Normes de Castelló) from 1932, a set of orthographic guidelines regarded as a compromise between the essence and style of Pompeu Fabra's guidelines, but also allowing the use of Valencian idiosyncrasies.

=== Valencian dialects ===
Dialects of Valencian

- Northern area:
  - Transitional Valencian (valencià de transició) or Tortosan (tortosí), also ambiguously termed Northern Valencian: spoken in the comarques situated between Castellon and the border, including towns like Benicarló, Vinaròs and Morella, as well as the contiguous areas to the north of the border: the Matarranya area in Aragon (province of Teruel) and a strip of southern Catalonia surrounding Tortosa.
    - Word-initial and postconsonantal /d͡ʒ/ (Catalan /ʒ/ and /d͡ʒ/ ~ /ʒ/) alternates with [(j)ʒ] intervocalically; e.g., joc [ˈd͡ʒɔ̞k] ('game'), but pitjor [piˈʒo] ('worse'), boja [ˈbɔ̞jʒɐ] ('crazy') (Standard Valencian /ˈd͡ʒɔk/, /piˈd͡ʒoɾ/; /ˈbɔd͡ʒa/; Standard Catalan /ˈʒɔk/, /piˈd͡ʒo/ and /ˈbɔʒə/).
    - Final ⟨r⟩ [ɾ] is not pronounced in infinitives; e.g., cantar [kɐn̪ˈtä] (standard /kanˈtaɾ/) ('to sing').
    - Archaic articles lo, los ('the') are used instead of el, els; e.g., lo xic ('the boy'), los hòmens ('the men').
  - Northern Valencian (valencià septentrional) or Castellonenc Valencian (valencià castellonenc): spoken in an area surrounding the city of Castellón de la Plana.
    - Use of [e] sound instead of standard ⟨a⟩ /a/ in the third person singular of most verbs; e.g., (ell) cantava [kɐn̪ˈtäve] (standard /kanˈtava/) 'he sang'. Thus, Northern Valencian dialects contrast forms like (jo) cantava [kɐn̪ˈtävɐ] ('I sang') with (ell) cantava [kɐn̪ˈtäve] ('he sang'), but merges (jo) cante [ˈkänte] ('I sing') with (ell) canta [ˈkänte] ('he sings').
    - Palatalisation of ⟨ts⟩ /t͡s/ > [t͡ʃ] and ⟨tz⟩ /d͡z/ > [d͡ʒ] (or [d͡ːʒ]); e.g., pots /ˈpot͡s/ > [ˈpot͡ʃ] ('cans, jars, you [s.] can'), dotze /ˈdod͡ze/ > [ˈdod͡ːʒe] ('twelve'). Thus, this dialect may merge passeig ('walk') and passets ('little steps').
    - Depalatalization of /jʃ/ to [jsʲ] by some speakers; e.g., caixa /ˈkajʃa/ > [ˈkajsʲɐ] ('box').
- Central area:
  - Central Valencian (valencià central), or Apitxat, spoken in Valencia city and its area. One of the two most widely spoken dialects of Valencian, it is not however used as the main model for the oral standard in Valencian media and education, and is sometimes connated negatively.
    - Sibilant merger: all voiced sibilants are devoiced (/d͡ʒ/ > [t͡ʃ], /d͡z/ > [t͡s], /z/ > [s]); that is, apitxat pronounces casa [ˈkäsɐ] ('house') and joc [ˈt͡ʃɔ̞k] ('game'), where other Valencians would pronounce /ˈkaza/ and /ˈd͡ʒɔ̞k/ (a feature shared with Ribagorçan). The names apitxat, parlar apitxat and the verb apitxar all refer to this specific pronunciation pattern - as well as itself representing a prime example of devoicing, since devoiced apitxar is also a synonym of voiced pitjar.
    - Betacism, that is the merge of /v/ into /b/; e.g., viu [ˈbiw] (instead of /ˈviw/) ('he/she lives').
    - Fortition (gemination) and vocalisation of final consonants; nit [ˈnitː(ə)] (instead of /ˈnit/) ('night').
    - It preserves the strong simple past, which has been substituted by an analytic past (periphrastic past) with vadere + infinitive in the rest of modern Catalan and Valencian variants. For example, aní instead of vaig anar ('I went').
- Southern area:
  - Southern Valencian (valencià meridional) or Upper Southern Valencian: spoken in the contiguous comarques located south of Valencia and north of Alicante, respectively, for example in the cities of Dénia, Gandia, Xàtiva and Alcoi, among others. This is the dialect which includes the largest number of general phonetic features considered proper to Standard Valencian, as well as being the second most widely spoken and located in the geographic centre of the country; it is therefore considered by some Valencians as a reference point for Valencian Catalan as a whole.
    - Vowel harmony: the final syllable of a disyllabic word adopts a preceding open ⟨e⟩ (/ɛ̞/) and/or ⟨o⟩ (/ɔ̞/) if the final vowel is an unstressed ⟨a⟩; e.g., terra [ˈtɛ̞rɛ̞] ('Earth, land'), dona [ˈdɔ̞nɔ̞] ('woman'). Further merges (such as [ˈtɛ̞rɔ̞] and [ˈdɔ̞nɛ̞]) depends on the town and speaker.
    - This dialect retains geminate consonants (⟨tl⟩ /lː/ and ⟨tn⟩ /nː/); e.g., guatla [ˈɡwɑɫːɐ] ('quail'), cotna [ˈkonːɐ] ('rind').
    - Weak pronouns are "reinforced" in front of the verb (em, en, et, es, etc.) contrary to other dialects which maintains "full form" (me, ne, te, se, etc.).
  - Alacantí Valencian (valencià alacantí) or Lower Southern Valencian: spoken in and around the cities of Alicante, Elche and the area of Carche in Murcia.
    - Vowel harmony like in the central Southern areas.
    - Intervocalic /d/ elision in most instances; e.g., roda [ˈrɔɐ] ('wheel'), nadal [ˈnɑːɫ] ('Christmas').
    - Yod is not pronounced in ⟨ix⟩ /jʃ/ > [ʃ]; e.g., caixa [ˈkaʃɐ] ('box').
    - Final ⟨r⟩ is not pronounced in infinitives in some areas and/or contexts; e.g., cantar [kɐn̪ˈtä] ('to sing').
    - There are some archaisms like: ans instead of abans ('before'), manco instead of menys ('less'), dintre instead of dins ('into') or devers instead of cap a ('towards').
    - There are more interferences with Spanish than other dialects: assul (from azul) instead of blau (or atzur) ('azure'), llimpiar (from limpiar) instead of netejar ('to clean') or sacar (from sacar) instead of traure ('take out').

== Authors and literature ==
- Misteri d'Elx (c. 1350). Liturgical drama. Listed as Masterpiece of the Oral and Intangible Heritage of Humanity by UNESCO.
- Curial e Güelfa (15th century), humanistic chivalric romance
- Ausiàs March (Gandia, 1400 – Valencia, 3 March 1459). Poet, widely read in renaissance Europe.
- Joanot Martorell (Gandia, 1413–1465). Knight and the author of the novel Tirant lo Blanch.
- Isabel de Villena (Valencia, 1430–1490). Religious poet.
- Joan Roís de Corella (Gandia or Valencia, 1435 – Valencia, 1497). Knight and poet.
- Obres e trobes en lahors de la Verge Maria (1474) The first book printed in Spain. It is the compendium of a religious poetry contest held that year in the town of Valencia.

== Media in Valencian ==
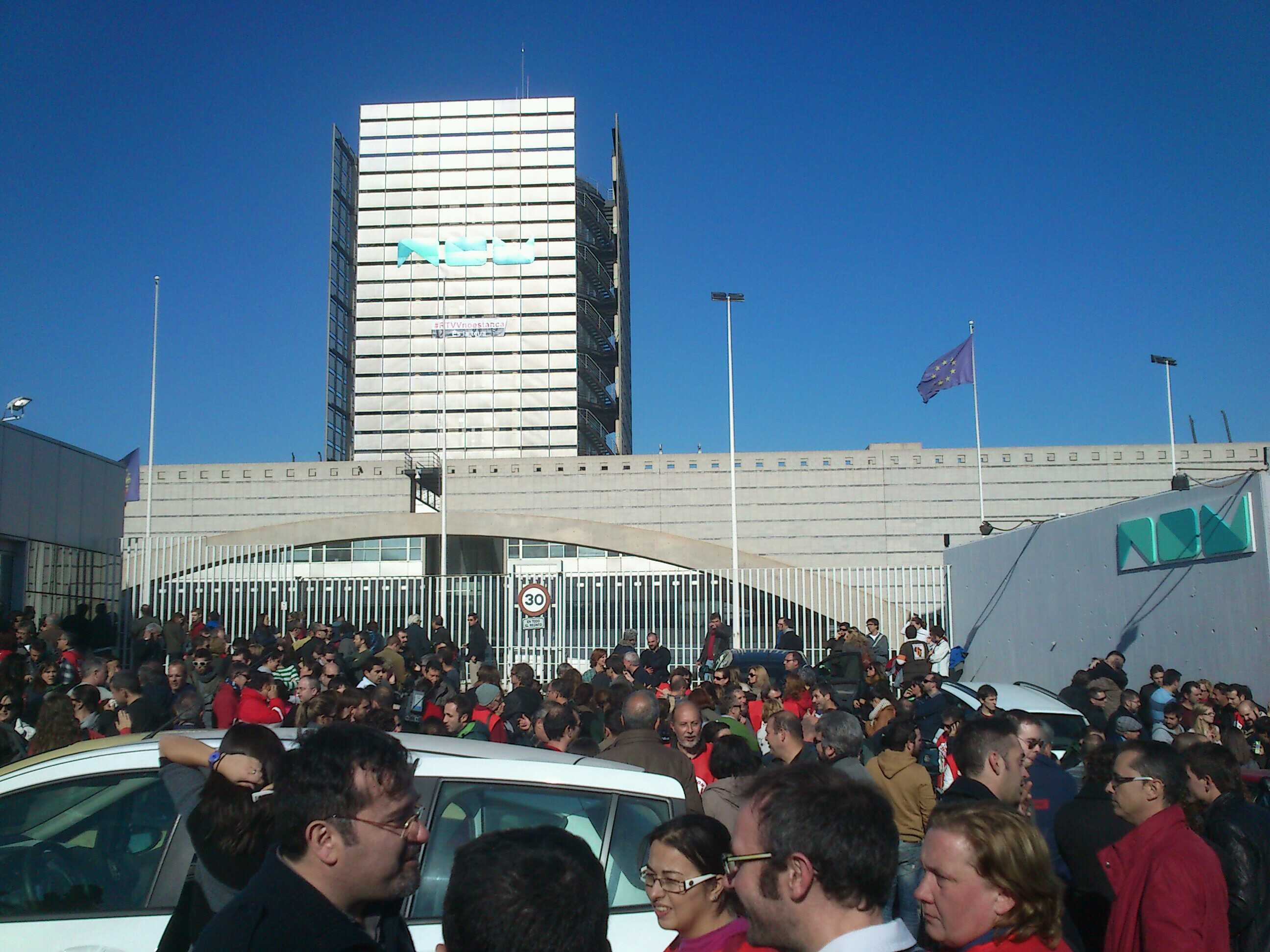
Employees demonstrate in front of the RTVV headquarters in Burjassot the day of its closure

Until its dissolution in November 2013, the public-service Ràdio Televisió Valenciana (RTVV) was the main broadcaster of radio and television in Valencian language. The Generalitat Valenciana constituted it in 1984 in order to guarantee the freedom of information of the Valencian people in their own language. It was reopened again in 2018 in the same location but under a different name, À Punt, and it is owned by À Punt Media, a group owned by the Generalitat Valenciana. The new television channel claims to be plural, informative and neutral for all of the Valencian population. It is bilingual, with a focus on the Valencian language. It is recognised as a regional TV channel.

Prior to its dissolution, the administration of RTVV under the People's Party (PP) had been controversial due to accusations of ideological manipulation and lack of plurality. The news broadcast was accused of giving marginal coverage of the Valencia Metro derailment in 2006 and the indictment of President de la Generalitat Francisco Camps in the Gürtel scandal in 2009. Supervisors appointed by the PP were accused of sexual harassment.

In face of an increasing debt due to excessive expenditure by the PP, RTVV announced in 2012 a plan to shed 70% of its labour. The plan was nullified on 5 November 2013 by the National Court after trade unions appealed against it. On that same day, the President de la Generalitat Alberto Fabra (also from PP) announced RTVV would be closed, claiming that reinstating the employees was untenable. On 27 November, the legislative assembly passed the dissolution of RTVV and employees organised to take control of the broadcast, starting a campaign against the PP. Nou TV's last broadcast ended abruptly when Spanish police pulled the plug at 12:19 on 29 November 2013.

Having lost all revenues from advertisements and facing high costs from the termination of hundreds of contracts, critics questioned whether the closure of RTVV improved the financial situation of the Generalitat, and pointed out to plans to benefit private-owned media. At that point, the availability of media in the Valencian language was extremely limited. All the other autonomous communities in Spain, including the monolingual ones, had public-service broadcasters, with the Valencian Community being the only exception despite being the fourth most populated.

In July 2016 a new public corporation, Valencian Media Corporation, was launched in substitution of RTVV. It manages and controls several public media in the Valencian Community, including the television channel À Punt, which started broadcasting in June 2018.

== Politico-linguistic controversy ==
Linguists, including Valencian scholars, deal with Catalan and Valencian as the same language. The current official regulating body of the language of the Valencian community, the Valencian Language Academy (Acadèmia Valenciana de la Llengua, AVL) considers Valencian and Catalan to be two names for the same language.

[T]he historical patrimonial language of the Valencian people, from a philological standpoint, is the same shared by the autonomous communities of Catalonia and Balearic Islands, and Principality of Andorra. Additionally, it is the patrimonial historical language of other territories of the ancient Crown of Aragon [...] The different varieties of these territories constitute a language, that is, a "linguistic system" [...] From this group of varieties, Valencian has the same hierarchy and dignity as any other dialectal modality of that linguistic system [...]

— Ruling of the Valencian Language Academy of 9 February 2005, extract of point 1. (Note: Original full text of Dictamen 1: D'acord amb les aportacions més solvents de la romanística acumulades des del segle XIX fins a l'actualitat (estudis de gramàtica històrica, de dialectologia, de sintaxi, de lexicografia…), la llengua pròpia i històrica dels valencians, des del punt de vista de la filologia, és també la que compartixen les comunitats autònomes de Catalunya i de les Illes Balears i el Principat d'Andorra. Així mateix és la llengua històrica i pròpia d'altres territoris de l'antiga Corona d'Aragó (la franja oriental aragonesa, la ciutat sarda de l'Alguer i el departament francés dels Pirineus Orientals). Els diferents parlars de tots estos territoris constituïxen una llengua, és a dir, un mateix "sistema lingüístic", segons la terminologia del primer estructuralisme (annex 1) represa en el Dictamen del Consell Valencià de Cultura, que figura com a preàmbul de la Llei de Creació de l'AVL. Dins d'eixe conjunt de parlars, el valencià té la mateixa jerarquia i dignitat que qualsevol altra modalitat territorial del sistema lingüístic, i presenta unes característiques pròpies que l'AVL preservarà i potenciarà d'acord amb la tradició lexicogràfica i literària pròpia, la realitat lingüística valenciana i la normativització consolidada a partir de les Normes de Castelló.)

Chronological map showing linguistic evolution of Valencian/Catalan in southwest Europe

The AVL was established in 1998 by the PP-UV government of Eduardo Zaplana. According to El País, Jordi Pujol, then president of Catalonia and of the CiU, negotiated with Zaplana in 1996 to ensure the linguistic unity of Catalan in exchange for CiU support of the appointment of José María Aznar as Prime Minister of Spain. Zaplana has denied this, claiming that "[n]ever, never, was I able to negotiate that which is not negotiable, neither that which is not in the negotiating scope of a politician. That is, the unity of the language". (Note: "Nunca, nunca, pude negociar lo que no se puede negociar, ni aquello que no está en el ámbito de la negociación de un político. Es decir la unidad de la lengua.") The AVL orthography is based on the Normes de Castelló (Castelló Norms), a set of rules for writing Valencian established in 1932.

A rival standard, commonly known as Norms of El Puig, was established in 1979 by the Royal Academy of Valencian Culture (Real Acadèmia de Cultura Valenciana, RACV), which considers itself a rival language academy to the AVL, and promotes an alternative standard. The Royal Academy of Valencian Culture treats Valencian as an independent language, rather than a variety of Catalan. Compared to the current official standard Valencian, the RACV's Norms rely exclusively on genuinely Valencian linguistic solutions, excluding many words not used in the Valencian Community, and also prefer spellings such as ⟨ch⟩ for /t͡ʃ/ and ⟨y⟩ for /j/ (as in Spanish). Furthermore, these alternative norms are also promoted and taught by the historic cultural association Lo Rat Penat.

Valencian is classified as a Western dialect, along with the North-Western varieties spoken in Western Catalonia (province of Lleida and most of the province of Tarragona). The various forms of Catalan and Valencian are mutually intelligible (ranging from 90% to 95%)

Despite the position of the official organisations, an opinion poll carried out between 2001 and 2004 showed that the majority (65%) of the Valencian people (both Valencian and Spanish speakers) consider Valencian different from Catalan: this position is promoted by people who do not use Valencian regularly. Furthermore, the data indicate that younger people educated in Valencian speaking areas are considerably less likely to hold these views. According to an official poll in 2014, 54% of Valencians considered Valencian to be a language different from Catalan, while 41% considered the languages to be the same. Different opinions about the unity of the language are different between people with certain levels of studies and the opinion also differs between each of the Valencian provinces. The opinion agreeing on the unity of Valencian and Catalan has significant differences regarding age, level of education and province of residence, with a majority of those aged 18–24 (51%) and those with a higher education (58%) considering Valencian to be the same language as Catalan. This can be compared to those aged 65 and above (29%) and those with only primary education (32%), where the same view has its lowest support. People living in the province of Castellon are more prone to be in favor of the unity of the language, while people living in the province of Alicante are more prone to be against the unity of the language, especially in the areas where Valencian is not a mandatory language at schools. By applying a binary logistic regression to the same data, it was found that, among all these variables, the relevant ones are political ideology, educational level, geographical origin and identity: negative views on the unity of Catalan/Valencian were much more likely to be held among right-wing partisans, people with lower studies, people from the Alicante province (the one with percentually the fewest Valencian speakers, especially in the areas where Valencian is not a mandatory language at schools) and people who do not self-identify as Valencian.

Later studies showed that the results differ significantly depending on the way the question is posed; the findings of the most recent work on polling indicate that Valencians today do widely agree that Valencian and Catalan belong to the same language, but that the wording of the question significantly alters the result, even more so than other statistically significant factors - which are the respondent's ideology, language skill and use, and ethnic self-identification: thus, references to Catalonia produce a measurable downturn in support and mentioning diversity within the same language strengthens their agreement.

The ambiguity regarding the term Valencian and its relation to Catalan has sometimes led to confusion and controversy. In 2004, during the drafting of the European Constitution, the regional governments of Spain where a language other than Spanish is co-official were asked to submit translations into the relevant language in question. Since different names are used in Catalonia ("Catalan") and in the Valencian Community ("Valencian"), the two regions each provided one version, but both versions were identical.

== Sample text ==
Article 1 of the Universal Declaration of Human Rights in Valencian:

Tots els éssers humans naixen lliures i iguals en dignitat i en drets i, dotats com estan de raó i de consciència, s’han de comportar fraternalment els uns amb els altres.

Article 1 of the Universal Declaration of Human Rights in English:

All human beings are born free and equal in dignity and rights. They are endowed with reason and conscience and should act towards one another in a spirit of brotherhood.

== See also ==
- Pluricentric language
- Valencian Sign Language
- Che (interjection) § Other uses (spelled xe in Modern Valencian)
- Valencian linguistic conflict
- Similar linguistic controversies:
  - Andalusian language movement
  - Names given to the Spanish language
  - Moldovan language
  - Occitan language
  - Serbo-Croatian

== Bibliography ==
- Beltran i Calvo, Vicent (2000), El parlar de la Marina Alta: El contacte interdialectal valencianobalear (in Valencian), Valencia: Departament de Filologia Catalana. Universitat d'Alacant
- Beltran i Calvo, Vicent (2005), El parlar de la Marina Alta: Microatles lingüístic de la Marina Alta (in Valencian), Valencia: Departament de Filologia Catalana. Universitat d'Alacant
- Beltran i Calvo, Vicent; Segura i Llopes, Carles (2018), Els parlars valencians (2 ed.), Valencia: Publicacions Universitat de València, ISBN 978-84-9134-240-3
- Palmada, Blanca, La fonologia del català i els principis actius (PDF) (in Catalan), Sèrie Lingüística, SPUAB
- Carbonell, Joan F.; Llisterri, Joaquim (1992), "Catalan", Journal of the International Phonetic Association, 22 (1–2): 53, doi:10.1017/S0025100300004618, S2CID 249411809
- Colomina i Castanyer, Jordi (1995), Els valencians i la llengua normativa, Alicante: Textos universitaris. Institut de Cultura "Juan Gil-Albert", ISBN 84-7784-178-0
- Costa Carreras, Joan; Yates, Alan (2009), The Architect of Modern Catalan: Selected Writings/Pompeu Fabra (1868–1948), Institut d'Estudis Catalans & Universitat Pompeu Fabra & Jonh Benjamins B.V., pp. 6–7, ISBN 978-90-272-3264-9
- Feldhausen, Ingo (2010), Sentential Form and Prosodic Structure of Catalan, John Benjamins B.V., ISBN 978-90-272-5551-8
- Guinot, Enric (1999), Els fundadors del Regne de València, Valencia: Edicions 3i4, ISBN 84-7502-592-7
- Hualde, José Ignacio (1992), Catalan, Descriptive Grammars, Routledge, doi:10.4324/9780203411766, ISBN 978-0-415-05498-0
- Jiménez, Jesús; Lloret, Maria-Rosa, Entre la articulación y la percepción: Armonía vocálica en la península Ibérica (PDF) (in Spanish)
- Jiménez, Jesús; Lloret, Maria-Rosa (2009), Harmonia vocàlica: Paràmetres i variació (PDF) (in Valencian)
- Lledó, Miquel Àngel (2011), "26. The Independent Standardization of Valencia: From Official Use to Underground Resistance", Handbook of Language and Ethnic Identity: The Success-Failure Continuum in Language and Ethnic Identity Efforts (Volume 2), New York: Oxford University Press, pp. 336–348, ISBN 978-0-19-539245-6
- Recasens Vives, Daniel (1996) [1991], Fonètica descriptiva del català: assaig de caracterització de la pronúncia del vocalisme i el consonantisme català al segle XX, Biblioteca Filològica (in Catalan), vol. 21 (2nd ed.), Barcelona. Spain: Institut d'Estudis Catalans, ISBN 978-84-7283-312-8
- Recasens Vives, Daniel (2014), Fonètica i fonologia experimentals del català (in Catalan), Barcelona. Spain: Institut d'Estudis Catalans
- Saborit Vilar, Josep (2009), Millorem la pronúncia, Acadèmia Valenciana de la Llengua
- Salvador i Gimeno, Carles (1995), Gramàtica valenciana, Valencia: Associació Cultural Lo Rat Penat, ISBN 84-85211-71-5, archived from the original on 21 October 2013
- Salvador i Gimeno, Carles (2001) [1963], Valencians i la llengua autòctona durant els segles XVI, XVII i XVIII, Valencia: Institució Alfons el Magnànim, ISBN 84-370-5334-X.
- Sanchis i Guarner, Manuel (1983), La llengua dels valencians, Valencia: Edicions 3i4, ISBN 84-7502-082-8
- Valor i Vives, Enric (1973), Curs mitjà de gramàtica catalana, referida especialment al País Valencià, Valencia: Grog Editions, ISBN 84-85211-45-6
- Veny, Joan (2007), Petit Atles lingüístic del domini català, vol. 1 & 2, Barcelona: Institut d'Estudis Catalans, p. 51, ISBN 978-84-7283-942-7
- Wheeler, Max; Yates, Alan; Dols, Nicolau (1999), Catalan: A Comprehensive Grammar, London: Routledge
- Wheeler, Max (2003), "5. Catalan", The Romance Languages, London: Routledge, pp. 170–208, ISBN 0-415-16417-6
- Wheeler, Max (2005), The Phonology of Catalan, Oxford: Oxford University Press, p. 54, ISBN 978-0-19-925814-7
- Wheeler, Max H. (2006), "Catalan", Encyclopedia of Language and Linguistics, Elsevier, ISBN 978-0-08-044299-0
