= Acadèmia Valenciana de la Llengua =

Valencian academic institution

The Acadèmia Valenciana de la Llengua (Note: Valencian pronunciation: [akaˈðɛmia valensiˈana ðe la ˈʎeŋɡwa]) (lit. 'Valencian Academy of the Language'; AVL) is the official regulatory institution for the Valencian language as used in the Valencian Community (known in other territories as Catalan). It was created on 16 September 1998 by an act of the Valencian Corts.

Its primary function is to determine and set the official standards for Valencian and foster its use. According to its foundational law, the AVL linguistic regulations for Valencian must follow current Valencian genuine linguistic reality, respect Valencian lexicographic and literary tradition and rely on consolidated regulations based upon the Normes de Castelló, a set of orthographic rules for Valencian signed in 1932.

The headquarters of the Acadèmia Valenciana de la Llengua are in Valencia. In addition this variety of the language follows the standardization pattern of the Catalan language in Catalonia as devised by Pompeu Fabra. The AVL linguistic rule does not differ a great deal from the IEC (Institute for Catalan Studies) standards. Nevertheless, AVL grammar (Gramàtica normativa valenciana) includes some specific features of Valencian syntax, and its dictionary (Diccionari normatiu valencià) contains thousands of words which are specific for the Valencian variety, as well as Valencian specific verb conjugation and some accent marks which differ from the variety of Catalonia.
