= Campos, Spain =

Campos
- Municipality and town
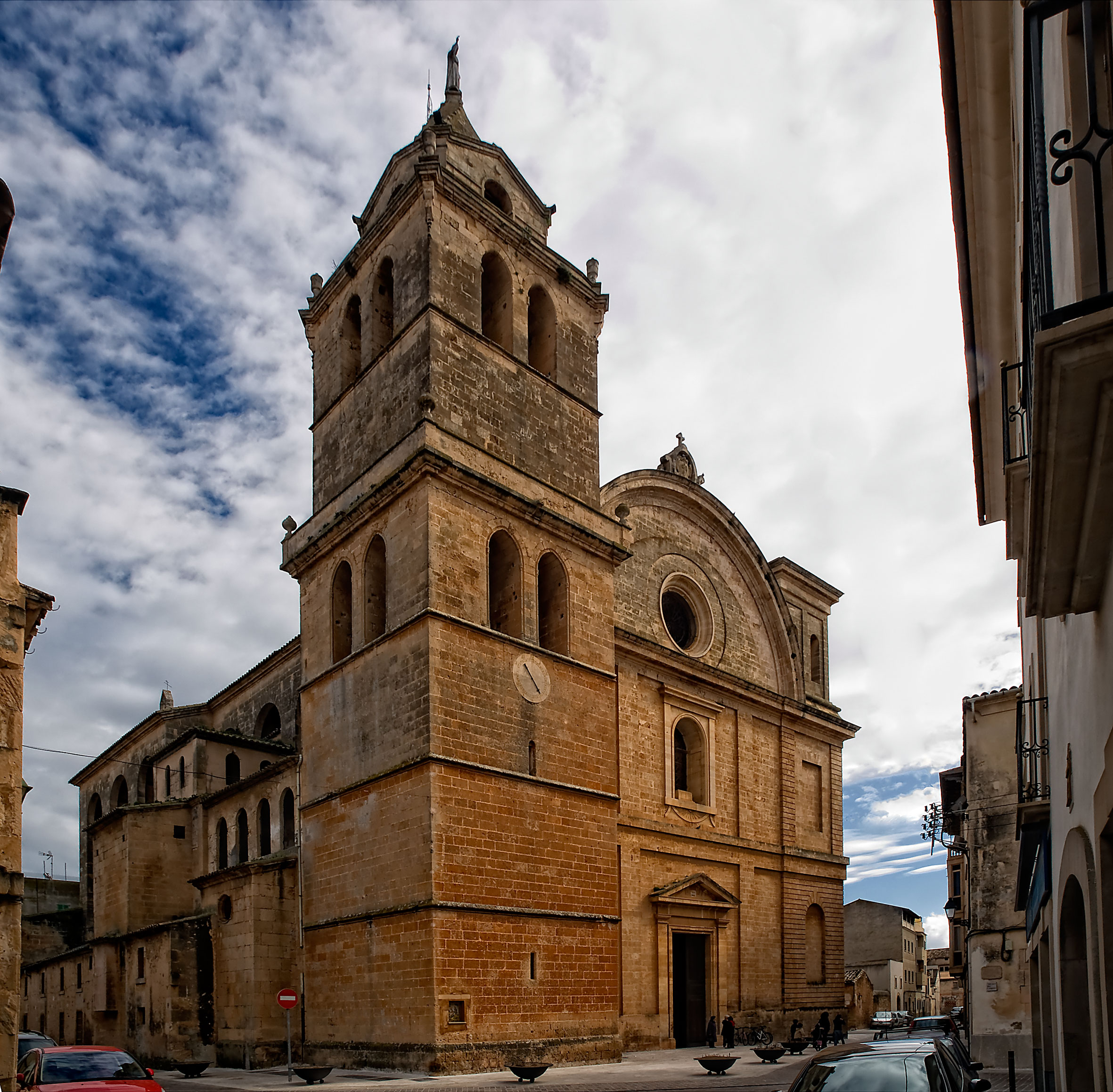
- Parish church of Sant Julià.

- Flag Coat of arms

- Municipal location

- Location of the town in Mallorca Campos (Balearic Islands) Campos (Spain)
- Coordinates: 39°25′50″N 3°01′10″E
- Country: Spain
- Autonomous Community: Balearic Islands
- Province: Balearic Islands
- Island: Mallorca
- Comarca: Migjorn

Government
  - Mayor (from 2019): Francisca Porquer

Area
  - Total: 57.80 sq mi (149.69 km^{2})
- Elevation: 105 ft (32 m)

Population (2025-01-01)
  - Total: 12,485
- Demonym: campaner
- Time zone: UTC+1 (CET)
  - Summer (DST): UTC+2 (CEST)
- Postcode: 07630
- Website: www.ajcampos.org

Campos (Balearic Catalan: [ˈkampos]) is a municipality on the island of Mallorca, Spain, located on the south side of the island in the comarca of Migjorn. It borders the municipalities Llucmajor, Porreres, Felanitx, Santanyí, and ses Salines.

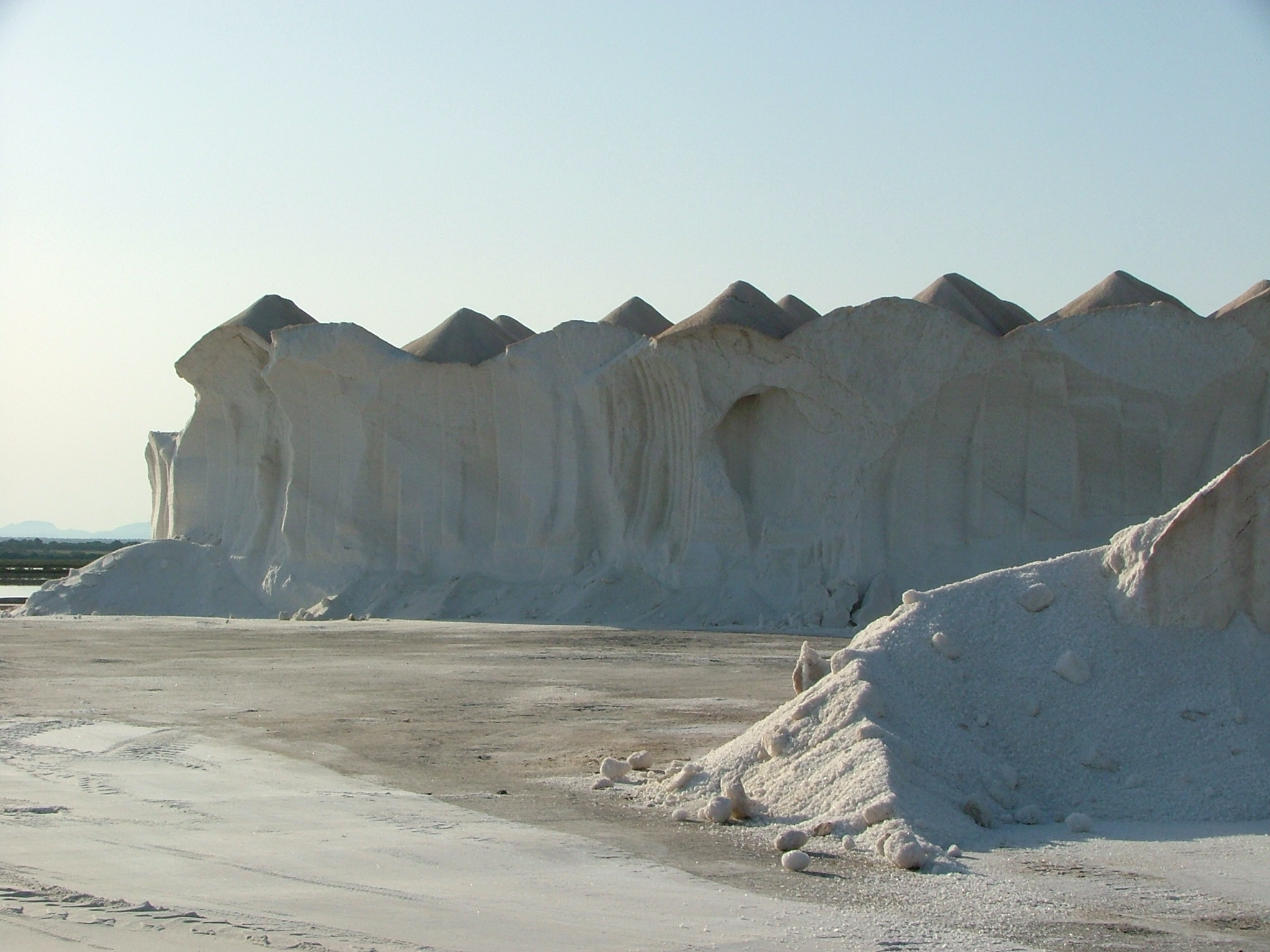
Salt stocks in Ses Salines.

The urban centers are the village of Campos and two tourist towns, sa Ràpita and ses Covetes. There are seven population centers in all.

== Economy ==
The economy of this municipality has been linked to agriculture since its foundation. Its lands are fertile and it uses irrigation cultivation.

Today the two coastal towns have developed because of tourism.

== Features ==
- Aljub de la Font Santa, an historic building, housing a rainwater storage well, built in 1671–1673.

== See also ==
- List of municipalities in Balearic Islands
