= CD Cala d'Or =

Spanish football team

Cala d'Or
- Full name: Club Deportivo Cala d'Or
- Founded: 1982
- Ground: Estadio Municipal, Cala d'Or, Santanyí, Spain
- Capacity: 2,000
- Chairman: (Spain) Santiago Padilla
- League: Primera Regional – Mallorca – Group A
- 2024–25: Primera Regional – Mallorca – Group A, 15th of 18
Home colours	Away colours

Club Deportivo Cala d'Or is a Spanish football team based in Cala d'Or, Santanyí, in the autonomous community of Balearic Islands. Founded in 1982, it plays in Primera Regional – Mallorca – Group A, holding home matches at Estadio Municipal de Cala d'Or, with a capacity of 2,000 seats.

== History ==
CD Cala d'or was founded in 1982, first reaching the fourth division in 1988, and going on to appear in a further five seasons in the category in the following 21 years.

Before the 2009–10 season started, the team withdrew from competition due to serious economic problems. After one year, it returned to official competition, in the third regional division, withdrawing again for 2012–13 season.

== Season to season ==
Season	Tier	Division	Place	Copa del Rey
1983–84	8	3ª Reg.	3rd	
1984–85	8	3ª Reg.	1st	
1985–86	7	2ª Reg.	1st	
1986–87	6	1ª Reg.	1st	
1987–88	5	Reg. Pref.	1st	
1988–89	4	3ª	16th	
1989–90	4	3ª	3rd	
1990–91	4	3ª	4th	First round
1991–92	4	3ª	20th	First round
1992–93	5	Reg. Pref.	20th	
1993–94	6	1ª Reg.	18th	
1994–95	7	2ª Reg.	17th	
1995–96	8	3ª Reg.	15th	
1996–97	8	3ª Reg.	13th	
1997–98	8	3ª Reg.	4th	
1998–99	8	3ª Reg.	4th	
1999–2000	7	2ª Reg.	16th	
2000–01	7	2ª Reg.	17th	
2001–02	8	3ª Reg.	7th	
2002–03	8	3ª Reg.	4th	

Season	Tier	Division	Place	Copa del Rey
2003–04	7	2ª Reg.	6th	
2004–05	7	2ª Reg.	2nd	
2005–06	6	1ª Reg.	1st	
2006–07	5	Reg. Pref.	1st	
2007–08	4	3ª	14th	
2008–09	4	3ª	15th	
2009–10	DNP			
2010–11	8	3ª Reg.	5th	
2011–12	8	3ª Reg.	13th	
2012–13	DNP			
2013–14	DNP			
2014–15	DNP			
2015–16	8	3ª Reg.	5th	
2016–17	8	3ª Reg.	7th	
2017–18	8	3ª Reg.	7th	
2018–19	8	3ª Reg.	5th	
2019–20	8	3ª Reg.	3rd	
2020–21	7	2ª Reg.	9th	
2021–22	9	3ª Reg.	5th	
2022–23	8	2ª Reg.	6th	

Season	Tier	Division	Place	Copa del Rey
2023–24	8	2ª Reg.	2nd	
2024–25	8	1ª Reg.	15th	
2025–26	8	1ª Reg.		

- 6 seasons in Tercera División
