= Cala d'Or =

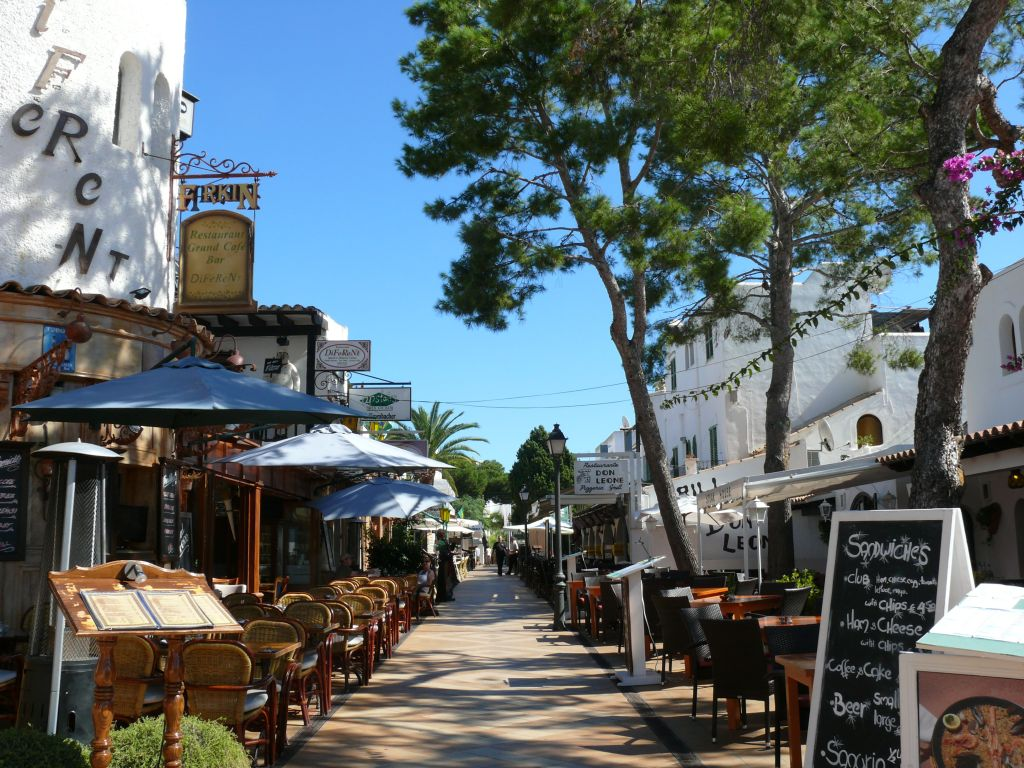
- Cala d'Or centre

- Location in Spain
- Coordinates: 39°22′27″N 3°13′52″E
- Country: Spain
- Autonomous community: Balearic Islands
- Province: Balearic Islands
- Comarca: Migjorn
- Judicial district: Manacor
- Municipality: Santanyí
- Elevation: 62 m (203 ft)

Population (2013)
  - Total: 3,823
- Demonym: Caladoreño
- Website: Official website

Cala d'Or is a village on the east coast of the island of Mallorca, in the municipality of Santanyí, Balearic Islands, Spain.

== Geography ==
Cala d'Or area belongs to the municipality of Santanyí, which lies further inland. The capital city Palma and Palma airport are approximately 60km (37.3mi) away.

The Village of Cala d'Or unfolds on three promontories along the southeastern coastline. It consists of three principal areas: Cala d'Or (centre), Cala Egos (west) and Cala Ferrera (east). The part east of Avenida Felanitx belongs to the municipality of Felanitx.

The rough coastline is interrupted by several bays with sandy beaches. From east to west these are: Cala Esmeralda ('emerald green'), Cala Gran ('big'), the namesake Cala d'Or (bay and beach), ('golden', also called Caló de ses Dones) and Cala Llonga ('long', also called Cala d'es Forti) with its small Caló d'es Pou. In the district of Cala Egos, located to the west, these are: Cala Egos (bay and beach), Cala Galera and Caló des Llamp. In the eastern part of Cala Ferrera (belonging to Felanitx) these are Cala Ferrera (bay and beach) and Cala Serena ('serenity').

The nearby village of Portopetro can be reached by bus or car within five to ten minutes.

== History ==
The Es Forti fortification was erected in 1740 and rebuilt after being destroyed by an earthquake in 1793. It protected the coastline against pirates. Today it is a historical site in Cala d'Or and Santanyí.

Its four sides are 26 meters each. On the sides facing the sea, there are hatches for cannons to fight oncoming ships. On the sides facing the land, there are holes to shoot through and fight against oncoming troops. The fort had four cannons and 19 soldiers.

In 1932, Josep Costa Ferrer (1876–1971), an artist, illustrator and architect from Ibiza, later called Don Pep Costa, planned a modern settlement for tourism and vacations. He originally named the new village after Cala d'Hort on the island of Ibiza, but Mallorcan settlers changed it to Cala d'Or ('Golden Bay').

== Village and harbour ==
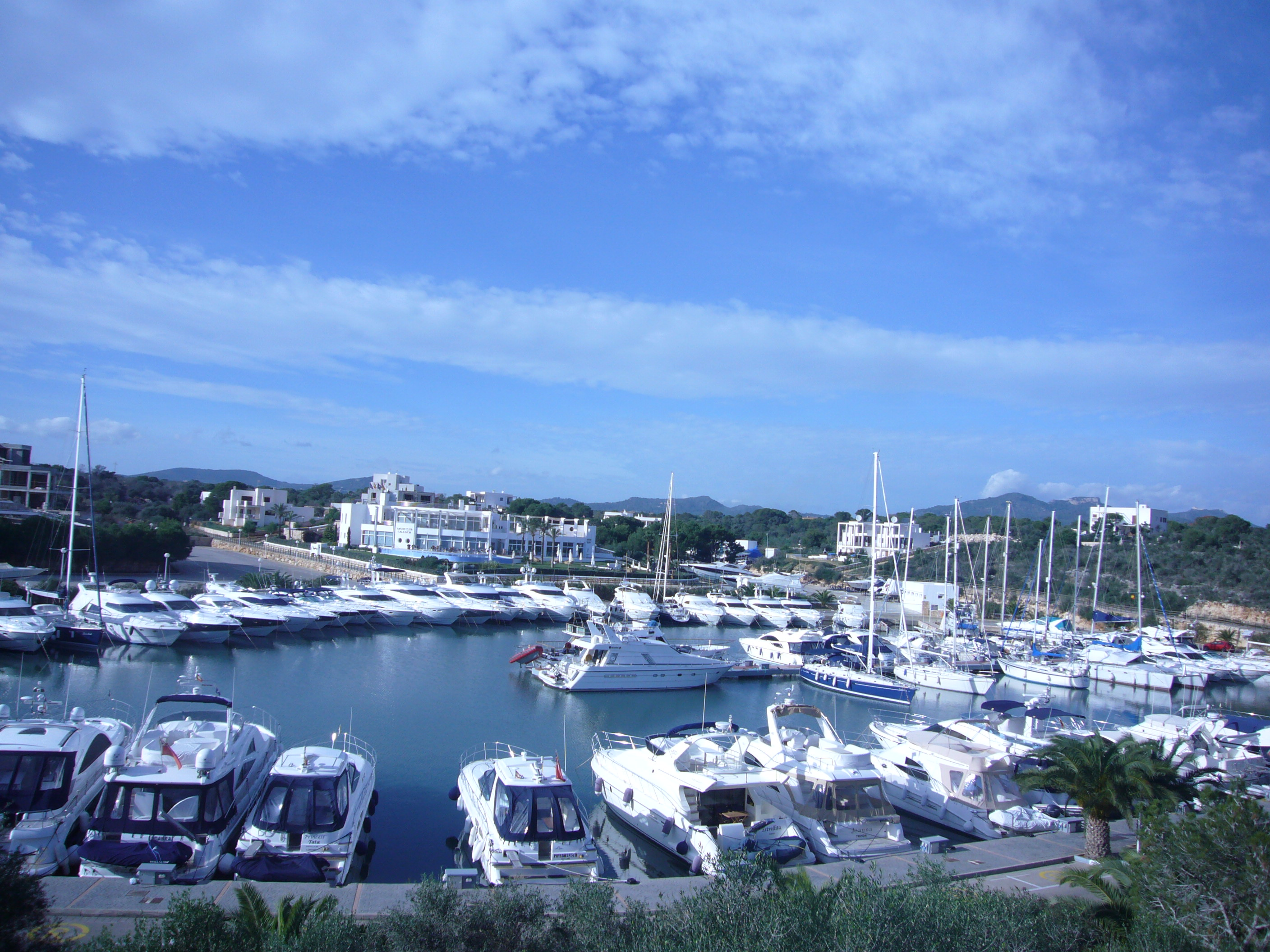
The marina of Cala d'Or

The centre of Cala d'Or is situated along both sides of Avenida Boulevard d' Or between the Complejo de Font Major (building) and Plaza de Ibiza (las Columnas) north of Cala d'Or Bay and Cala Gran Bay. Other shops, restaurants and bars can be found in the northeast in Cala Ferrera along the road S'Espalmador near Cala Ferrera Bay and Cala Esmeralda Bay, in the southwest in Cala Egos along the road Avenida de Marina near Cala Egos Bay and along the road Avenida de Cala Llonga in the marina and the road Avenida de Baixada al Port.

The majority of buildings in Cala d'Or are painted white in the Mediterranean tradition. The outskirts of the settlement are home to holiday villas whereas nearer to the coast it is dotted with several hotels and apartments. In general buildings are small and cubic in Ibizan style. This is not accidental, because the Ibizan architect Josep Costa Ferrer was inspired by his homeland when he was planning Cala d'Or.

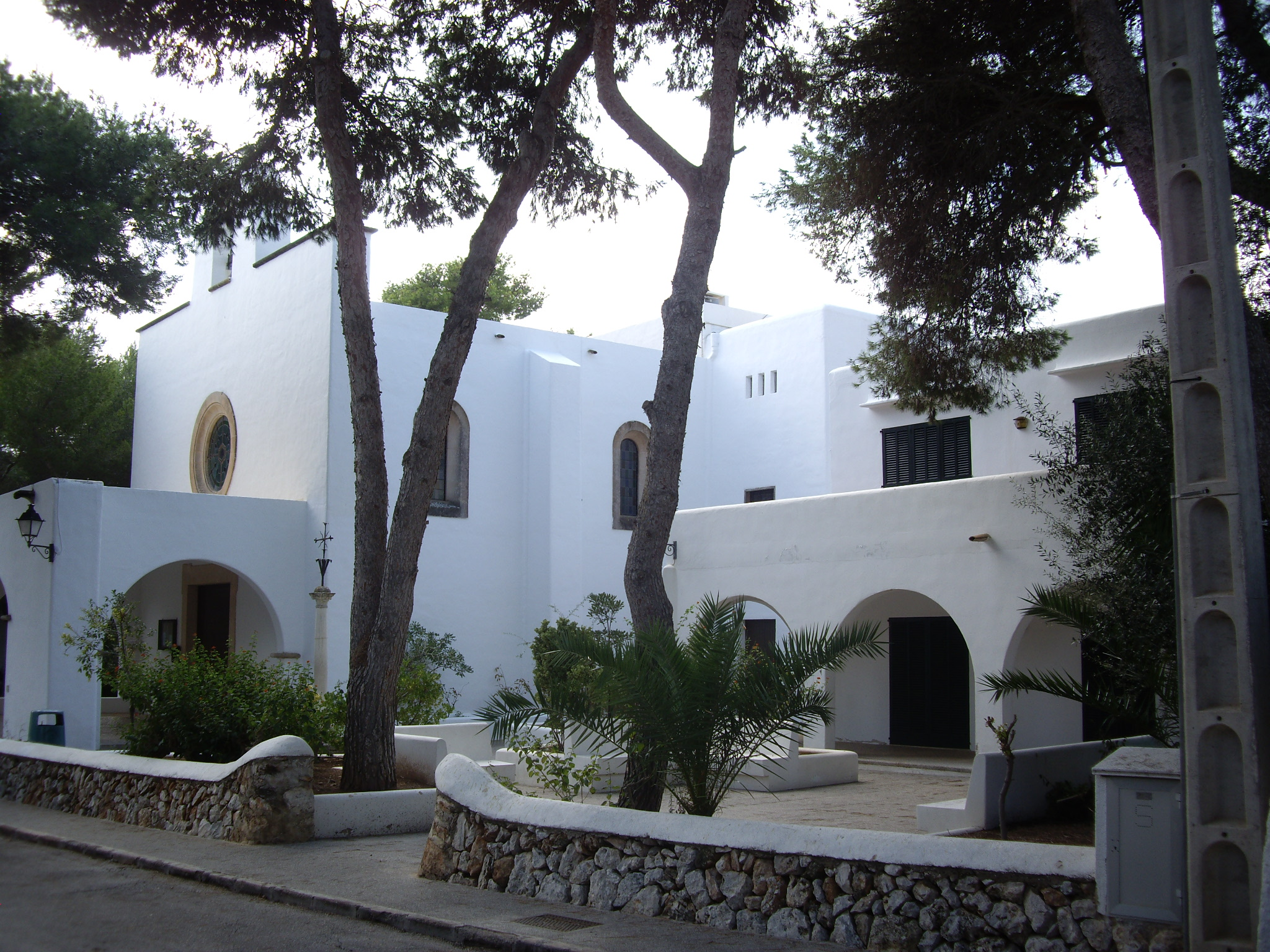
Church of Cala d'Or in Ibizan style. It is located in the village's Plaça de la Figuera area

The Church Santa María del Mar was erected in 1956.

The town centre is very lively in the summer months but not crowded like the larger and more populated resorts in Mallorca. The pedestrian area offers a variety of shops, bars, and restaurants with local and international cuisine.

The marina is situated in Cala Llonga, a large bay. The marina offers 563 berths in a 30,000 m^{2} (320,000 sq ft) area. Also popular is the marina area which welcomes yachts and chartered boats throughout the year, offering some of the best protection from storms in the whole of Mallorca, although the entrance can be very tight for turning. The marina offers some exclusive restaurants and bars.

The resorts of Cala d'Or are very popular with families and couples from all over Europe.

Cala d'Or was one of the first major tourist resorts in Mallorca. The buildings were Ibizan-themed; small pretty white-washed villas, apartments and houses and even hotels had to stick rigidly to the theme.

Over the years this area has grown in size and more and more tourists come to explore fine dining and enjoy the quiet areas near the natural park of Mondrago. Many of the hotels in Cala d'Or and Cala Egos offer all-inclusive holidays, but there are also luxurious villas and apartment for rent.

Cala d'Or attracts mostly western European tourists such as Germans, British and French.

== Traffic ==
Road traffic in Cala d'Or is through traffic circles (1–19), which are decorated with sculptures or plants. Coming from Calonge from the north, traffic circle 1 is the northern entrance to the town. Coming from Portopetro to the west, traffic circle 11 is the western entrance to the town. Coming from S'Horta from the northeast, traffic circle 6 the eastern entrance.

A mini-train runs regularly between the coves and beaches, connecting all parts of Cala d'Or.

The Red Bus operated by the private transportation provider TIB connects Cala d'Or to other villages and towns.

== Gallery ==
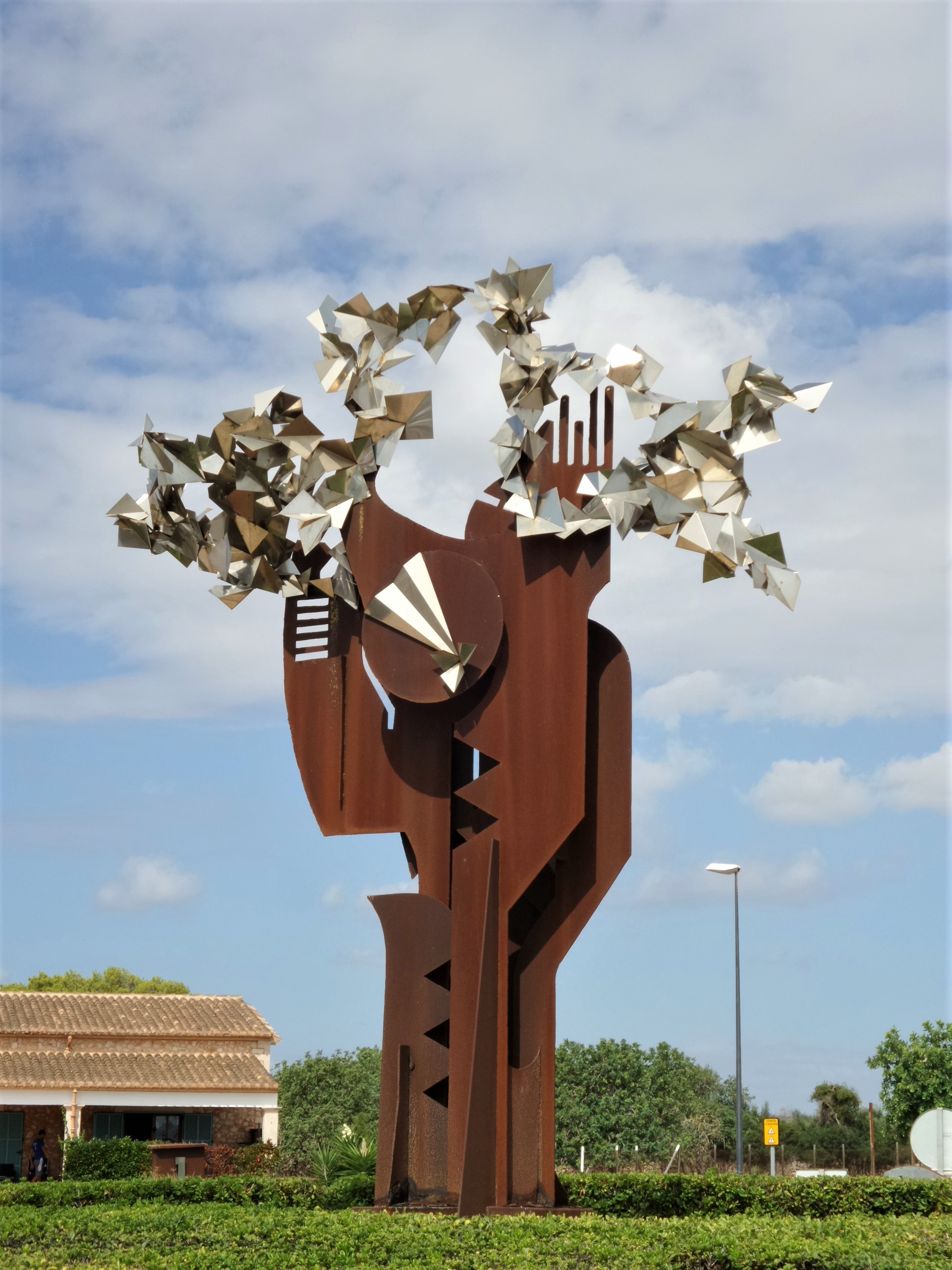
traffic circle 1, northern entrance to Cala d’Or

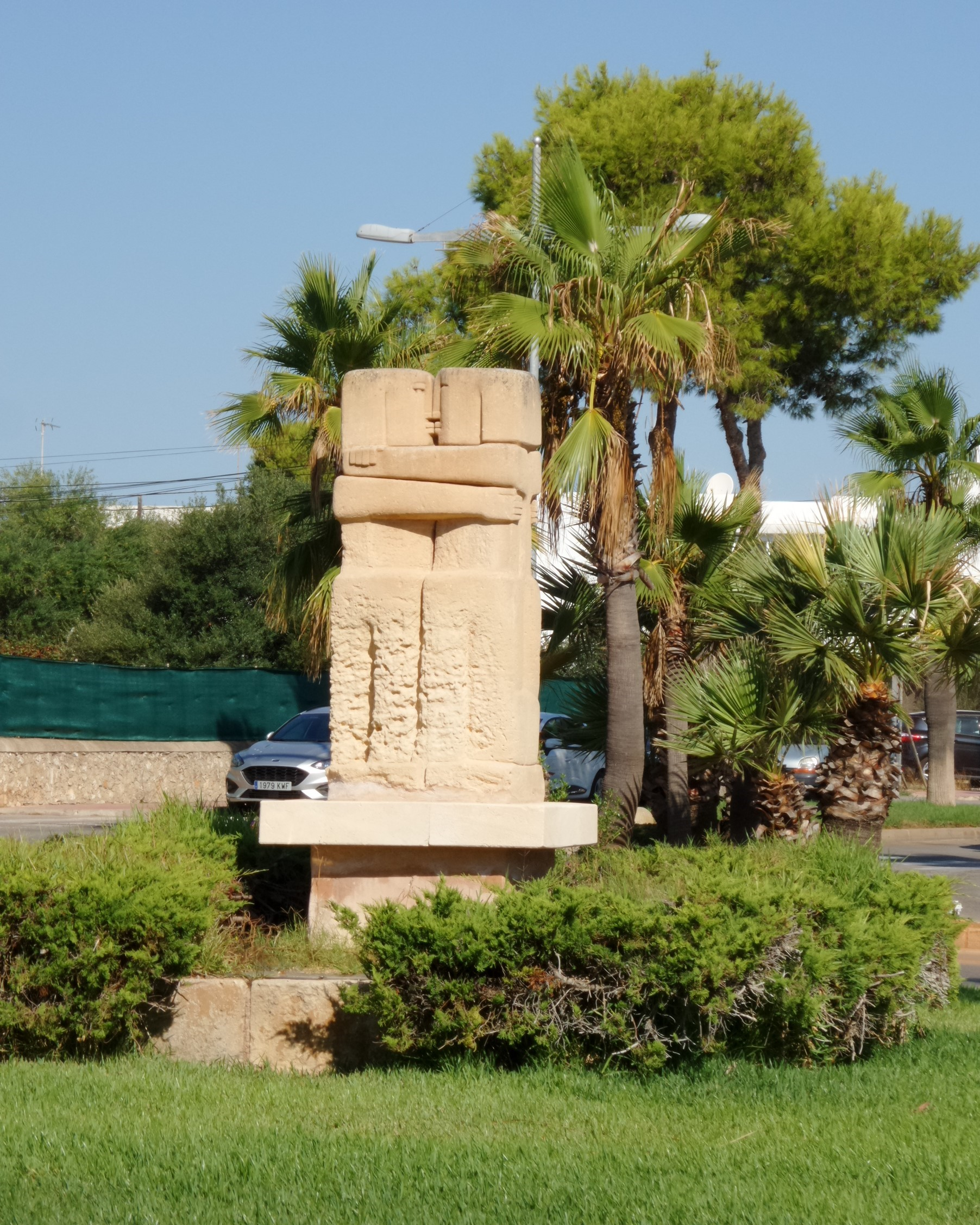
traffic circle 2, sculpture, Kiss, hommage to Constantin Brâncuși

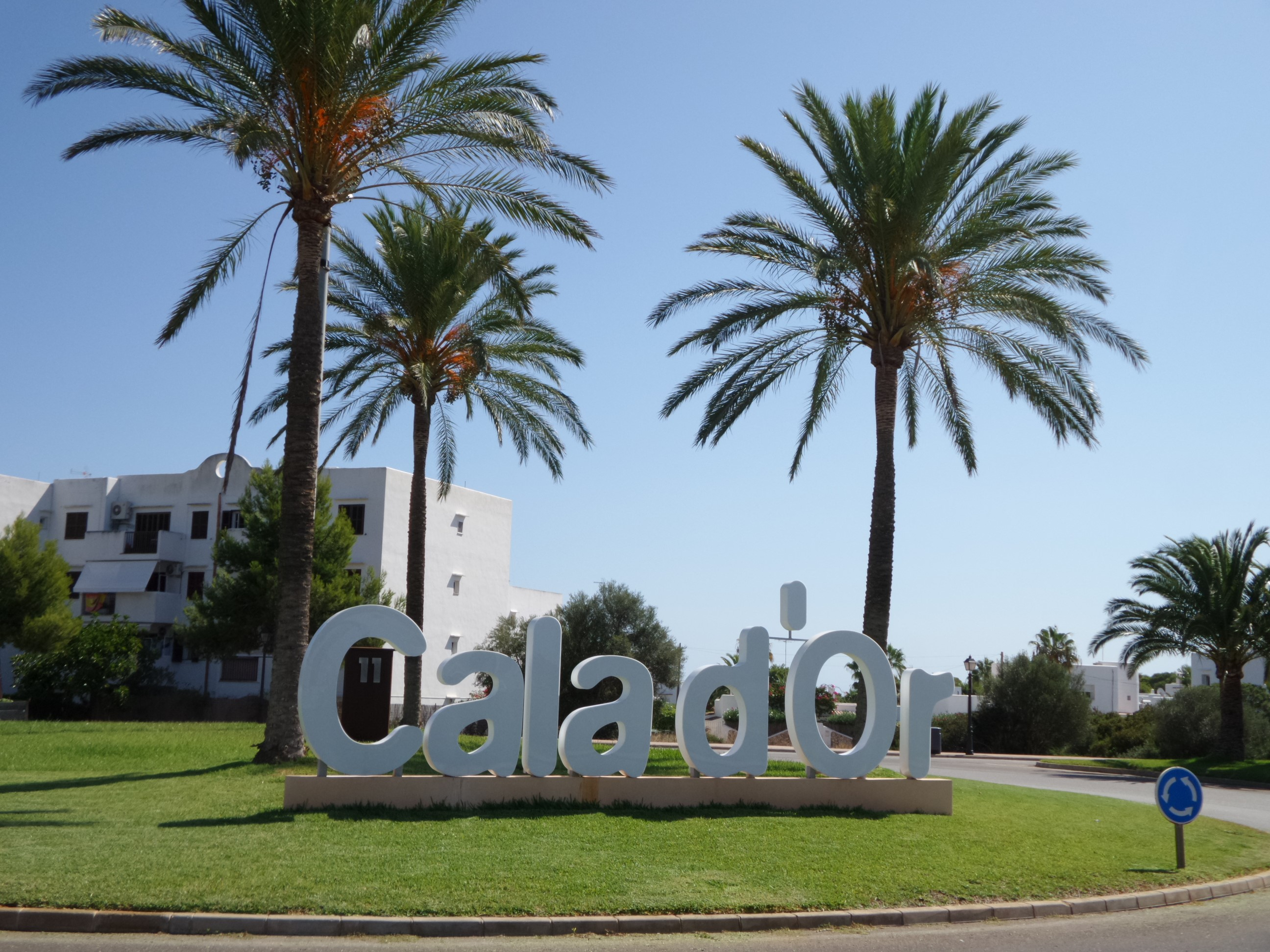
traffic circle 11, western entrance to Cala d’Or

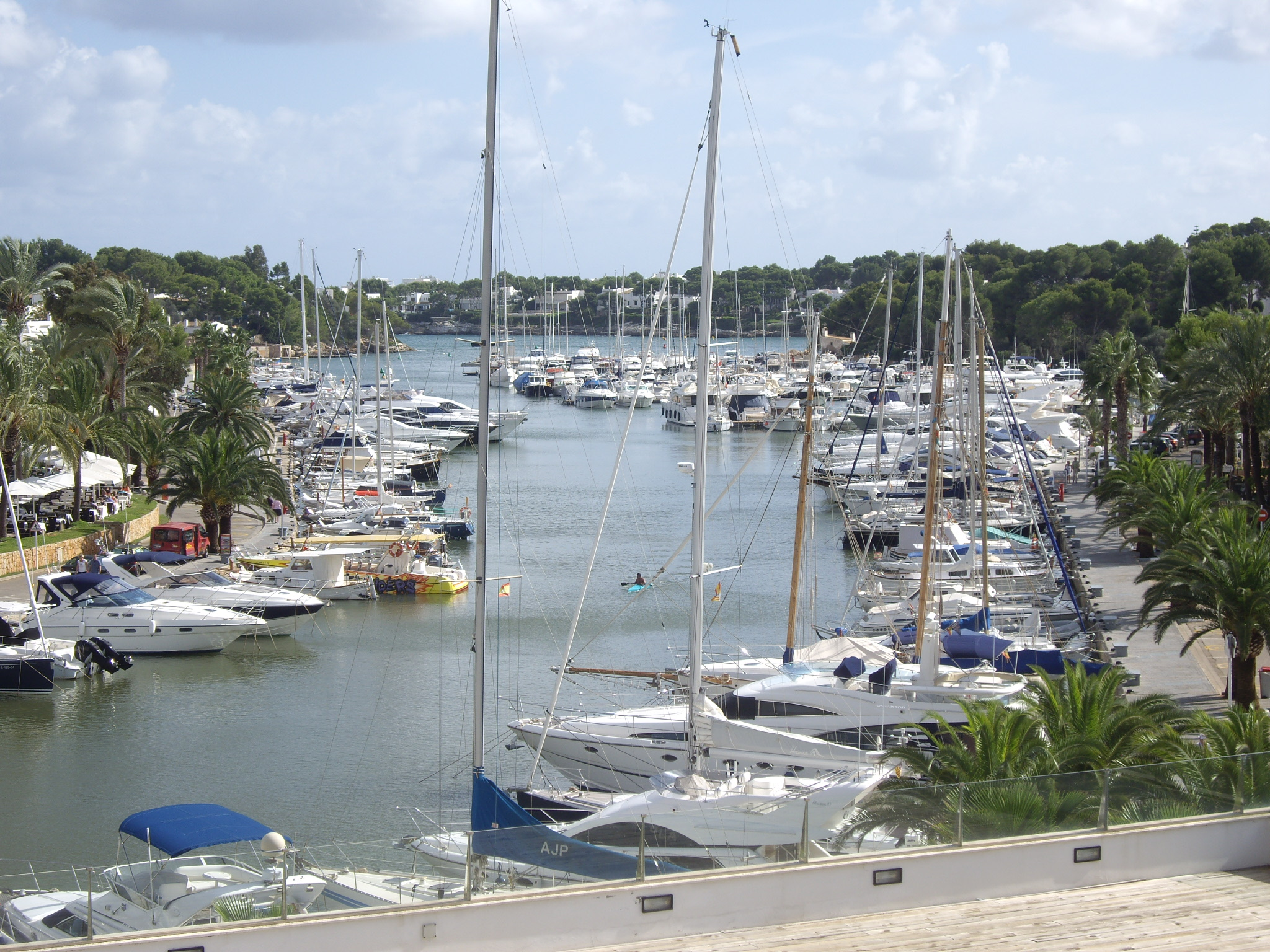
Cala Llonga and
Marina of Cala d'Or

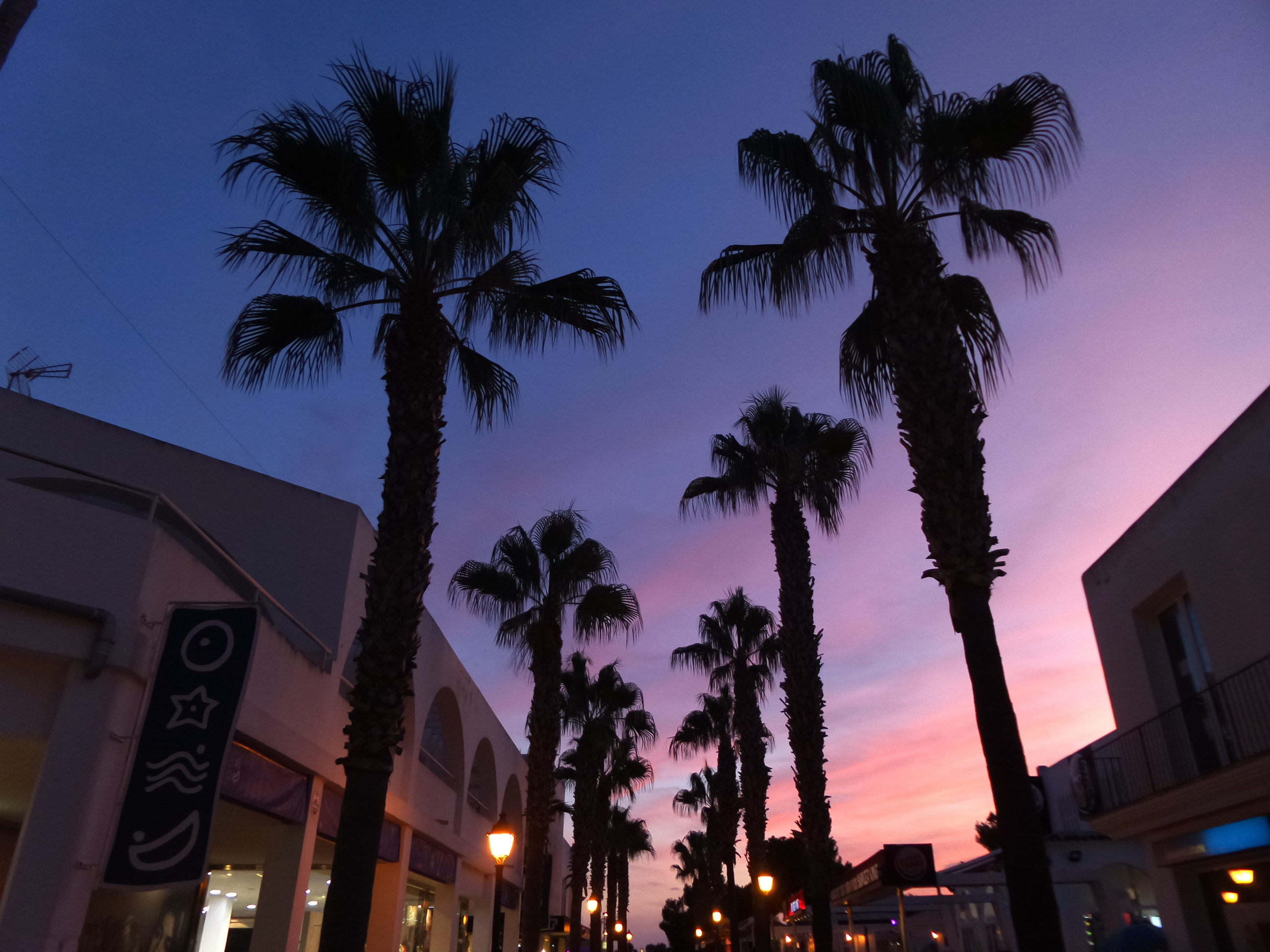
Cala d'Or by night

== Bays and beaches in the village ==
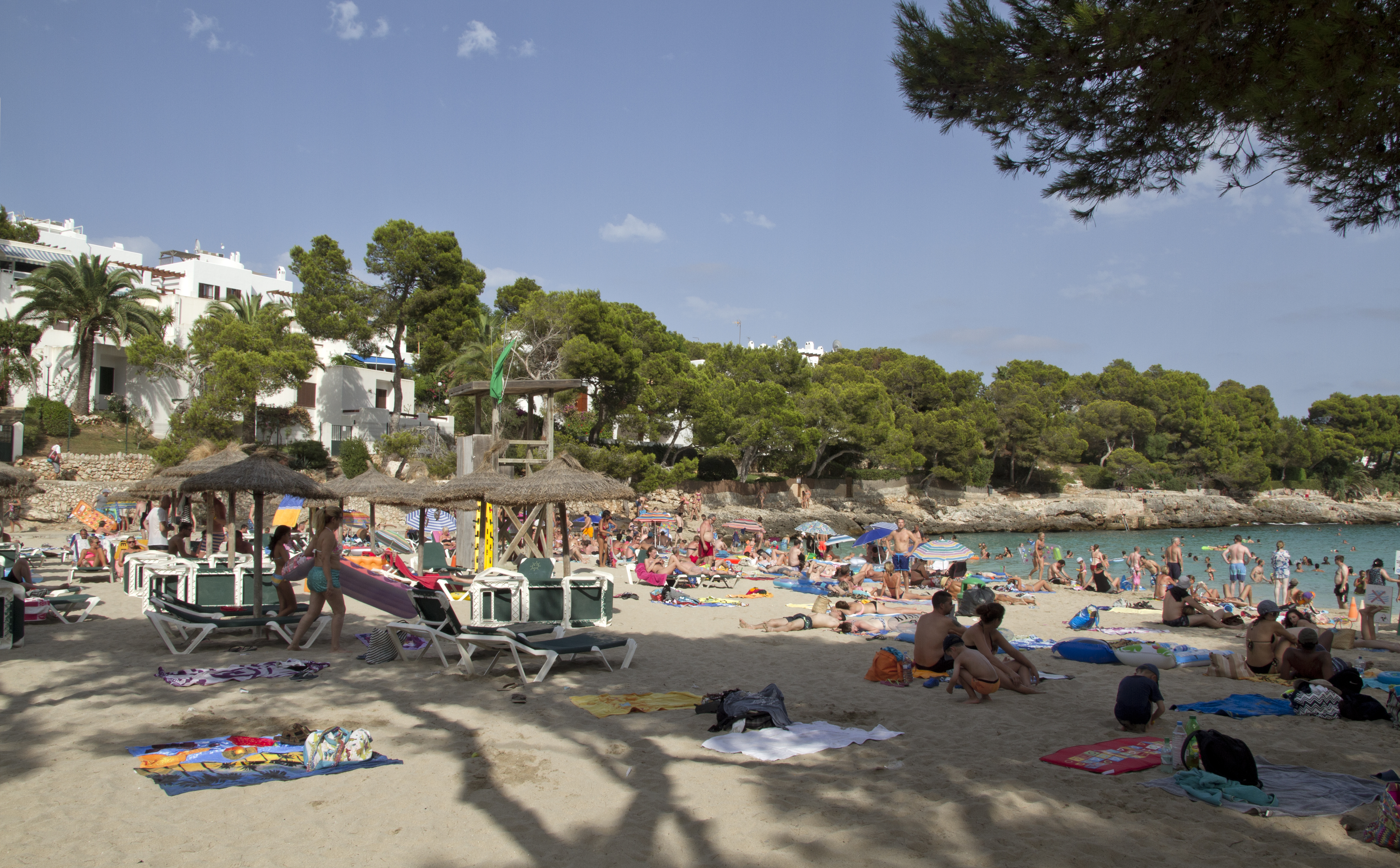
Cala d’Or (Bay)

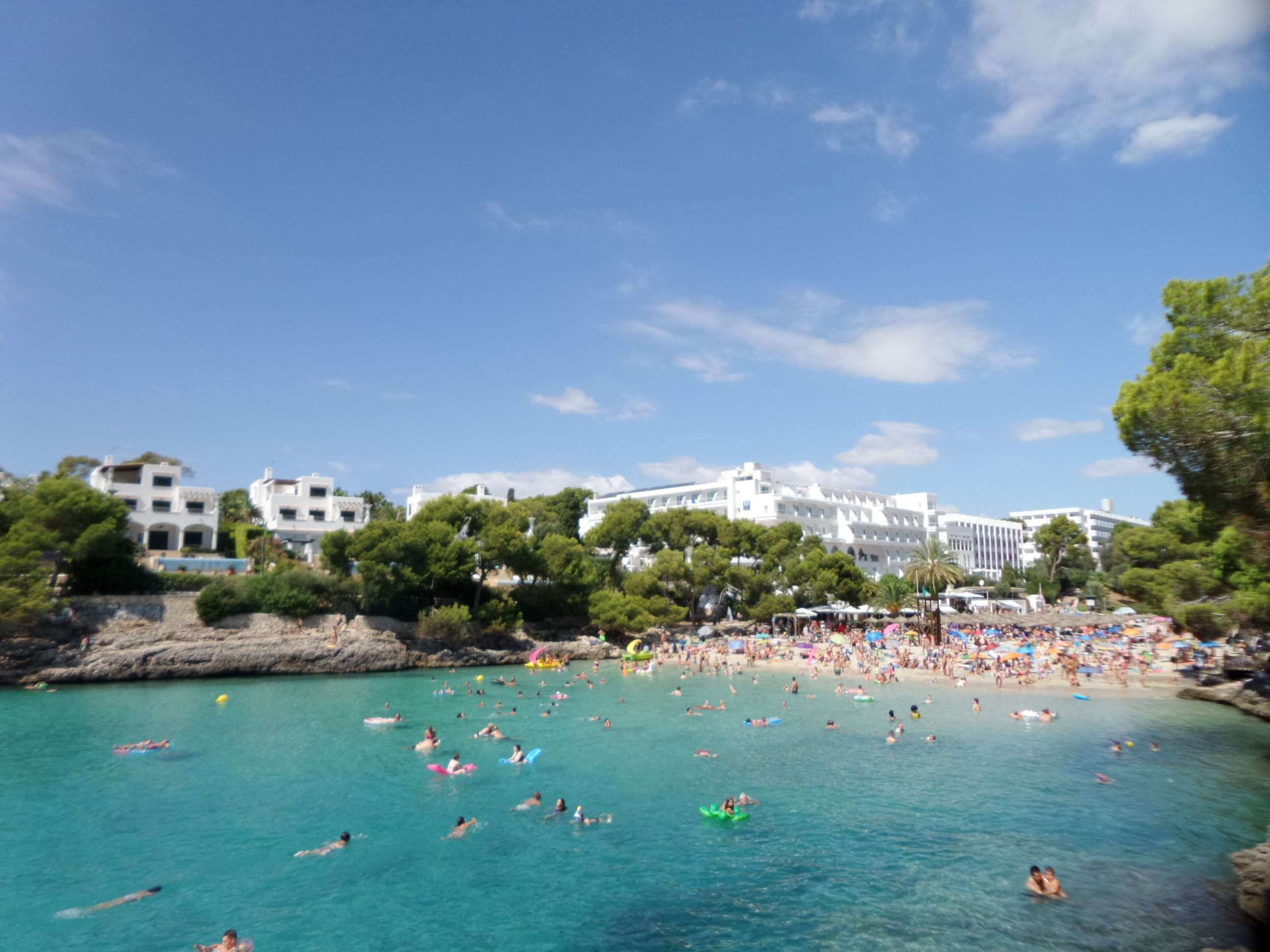
Cala Gran

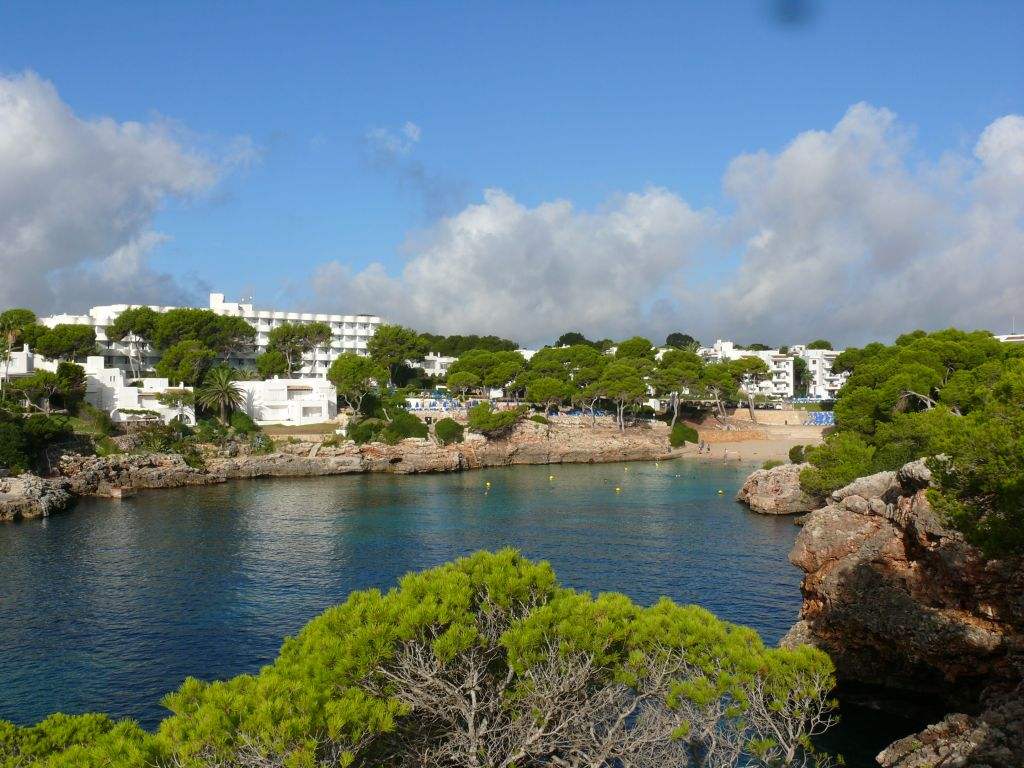
Cala Esmeralda

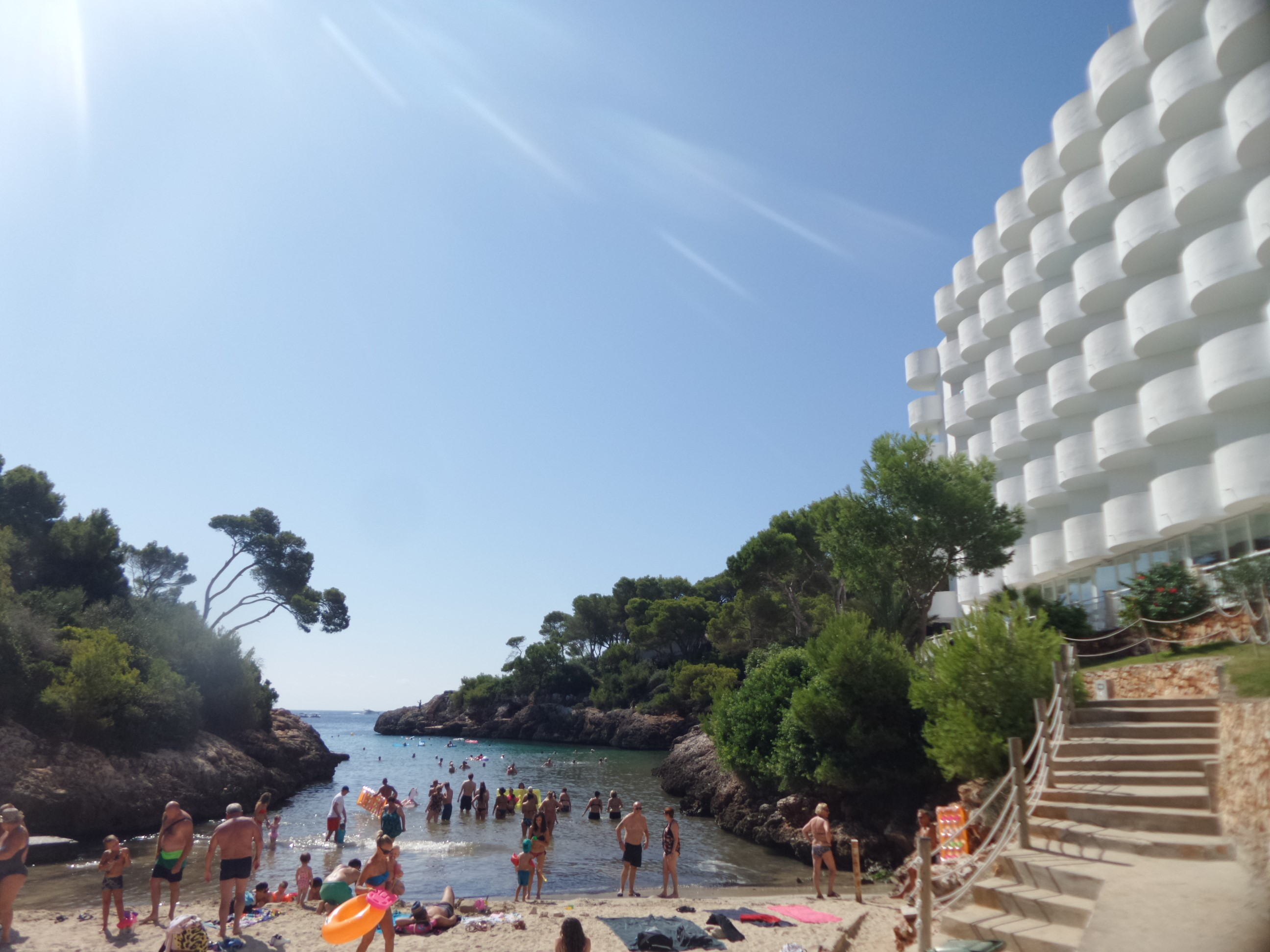
Cala Egos
- Cala d'Or
- Cala Gran
- Cala Esmeralda
- Caló d'es Pou
- Cala Egos
- Cala Ferrera (Felanitx)
- Cala Serena (Felanitx)

== Nearby locales ==
- Cala sa Nau, northeast from Cala d'Or, approximately 4 km (2.5 mi) away.

=== Parc natural de Mondragó ===
- S'Amarador and Ses Fonts de n'Alís, southwest from Cala d'Or and Portopetro, approximately 5 km (3.1 mi) away.
  Both beaches are situated in Cala Mondragó in the nature preserve Parc natural de Mondragó.
