= Cala Llombards =

Beach and resort on Majorca, Spain

Coordinates: 39°19′11″N 3°08′03″E

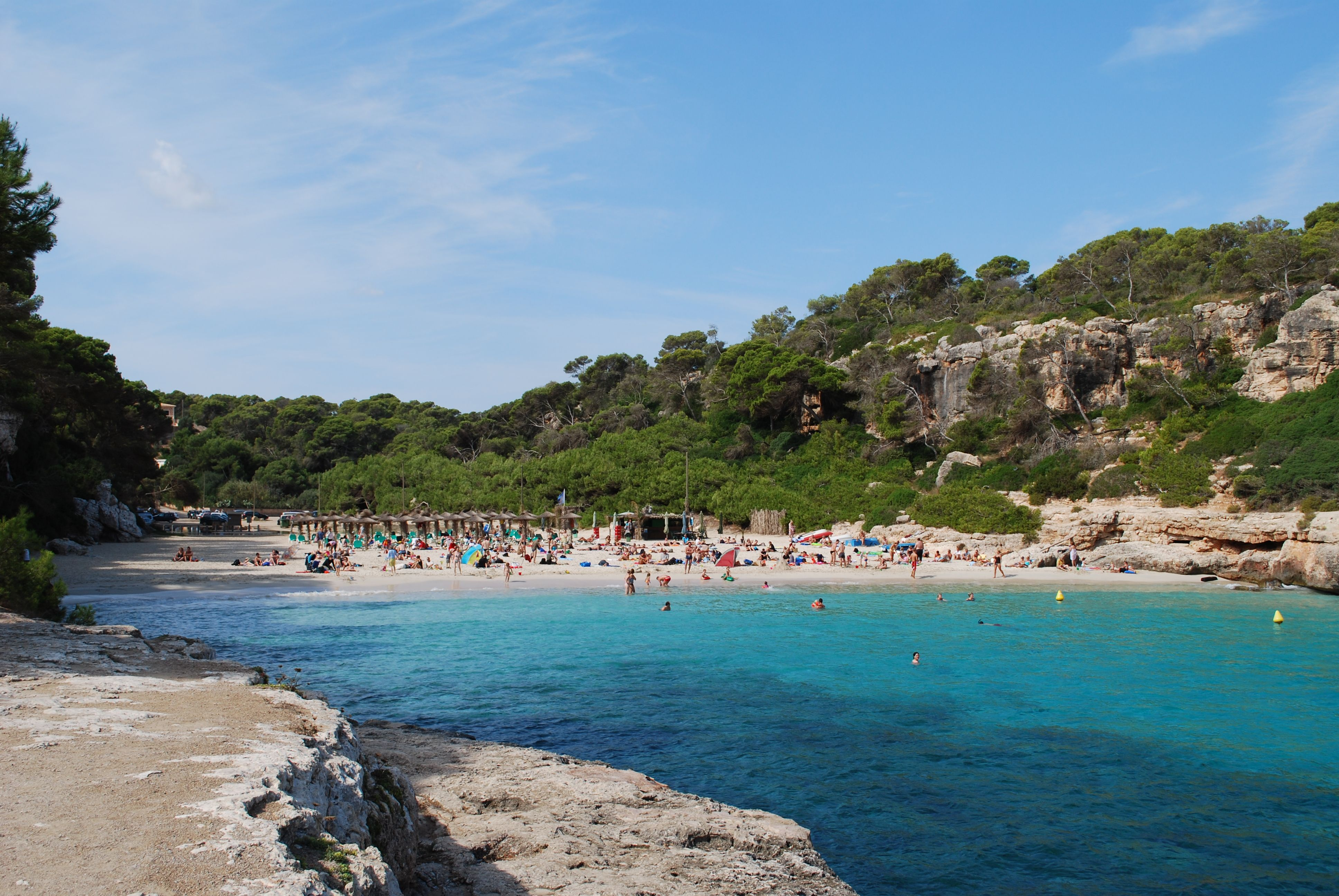
Cala Llombards

Cala Llombards (pronounced [ˈkalə ʎomˈbaɾs]) is a beach and resort on the southeast coast of Majorca, located in Santanyí municipality. The village where it is located is called Es Llombards. The beach is relatively unknown by tourists and tends to be frequented by local holiday villa owners. The famous Finca Rustica is located in Cala Llombards.
