= Miquel Bauçà =

Miquel Bauçà Rosselló
- Born: 7 February 1940; Felanitx, Mallorca, Spain
- Died: 2004 (aged 64); Barcelona, Catalonia, Spain
- Writing career
- Language: Catalan
- Notable works: Carrer Marsala (1985); El Canvi (1998)

Miquel Bauçà Rosselló (Balearic Catalan: [miˈcɛl bəwˈsa rosəˈʎo]; 1940–2004) was a Mallorcan poet and writer in the Catalan language. His poems have appeared in most contemporary Catalan poetry anthologies. He was recognized as a talented poet from a young age with Una bella història (1962). Bauçà wrote poetry and narrative work, contained in the publication of El Canvi (1998), the highlight of his work and the beginning of a poetic-encyclopedic project that deepened his later works. He died in late 2004, in solitude; his body was discovered in early 2005.

== Early life ==
Bauçà came from a farming family in Felanitx. He was predominantly raised by a cruel father after his mother died when he was 12; the lost relationship with his mother is detailed in a poem included in Una bella història. Shortly after his mother died, Bauçà was sent to a seminary in Palma. Bauçà's grandfather was well-loved on the island. In childhood, he was described as "quiet and a little shy".

In the late 1950s, Bauçà and friends Joan Julià Maimó, Josep Grimalt and Joan Manresa started a young writers group in Felanitx. During this time, Bauçà may have taken influence from Blai Bonet, a poet writing in Mallorcan style, using carnal and philosophical language. The Catalan language was particularly oppressed during the Franco regime, and using it for his writing was a political statement.

Bauçà himself wrote that there is little to note about his life after he turned 18.

== Career and influence ==
Bauçà lived the life of a hermit, but was also said to have an "unapologetically obsessive vitriol". He secluded himself in his apartment in Barcelona and did not own any books himself; he wrote at a long desk that "lined an entire room". In his seclusion, he refused his award for Carrer Marsala, and was an advocate for more equity in professional writing. Bauçà wrote experimental prose that has been compared to Robert Walser, Dino Buzzati, and Franz Kafka. Both aspects of his life and work have resulted in Bauçà being regarded more for his eccentricity than his work outside of Catalan-speaking countries. His poetry was notably diverse, when his character could suggest he would be univocal. In his biography of the author, Xavier Gual wrote that Bauçà was "renowned for his verbal and social radicalism".

His first published poetry collection was Una bella història, which has been said to have "a strange, completely literal realism, galvanized by a melancholy, scathing and strangely fresh view of things"; Pere Antoni Pons wrote in 2017 that "the book represented an earthquake in the Catalan poetic scene". Before this, he had written two other known collections: La carn i el goig and Cants jubilosos. After his first publication, Bauçà moved to the Catalan mainland to study literature and philosophy at the university in Barcelona, taking with him the recommendation of Josep M. Llompart, considered "the highest critical authority on island poetry". During his university years, Bauçà's eccentricity became accentuated. He had a developmental disability that made communication with people difficult, and also fell into alcoholism.

He won several awards, though critics turned colder after his first prose work, Carrer Marsala. Gual explains that he became the reference point as a writer whose work was "committed to an integral idea", being outside the literary system of the time. However, he continued to win awards for his later works.

== Death ==
At an unknown time in late 2004, Bauçà died in his apartment in Eixample, Barcelona. His body was found by the Mossos d'Esquadra on 3 January 2005; the news was not released until over a month later when he was officially identified. In 2006, a documentary called Miquel Bauçà, poeta invisible was made about his life. Years after his death, a book of early poems was discovered and published posthumously. It had been in the collection of Pere Oliver Domenge, a mayor of Felanitx who had briefly had to live in exile from Franco in the Philippines.

Gual wrote that he "[left] behind an unclassifiable literary corpus, which has unquestionably expanded the bounds of contemporary Catalan literature."

== Works ==
=== Poetry ===
- Una bella història (1962) Won the Premio Joan Salvat-Papasseit de poesía
- El noble joc (1972)
- Poemes (1973)
- Notes i comentaris (1975) Won the Premio Vicent Andrés Estellés de poesía
- Cants jubilosos (1977) Won the Premio en el Certamen de honor de la Mare de Déu de Sant Salvador de Felanitx
- Les Mirsines: colònia de vacances (1983)
- Obra poètica 1959-1983 (1987)
- El crepuscle encén estels (1992)
- En el feu de l'ermitage Won the Premi Miquel de Palol de poesia
- El Canvi (1998) Won the Premio Crítica Serra d'Or
- Els estats de connivència (2001)
- Els somnis (2003)
- Rudiments de saviesa (2005)
- Certituds immediates (2007)
- La carn i el goig (2017; written in the 1950s)

=== Narrative works ===
- Carrer Marsala (1985) Won the Premio Ciudad de Barcelona
- L'estuari (1990) Won the Premio Sant Joan de narrativa
- El vellard. L'escarcellera (1992)
