= Rafael Adrover =

Spanish academic and paleontologist (1911–2007)

- Born: Antoni Adrover Bennàsar; 22 October 1911; Felanitx, Spain
- Died: 30 January 2007 (aged 95); Las Palmas, Spain
- Citizenship: Spanish
- Occupations: Schoolteacher; Paleontologist; Clergyman
- Known for: Authored 2 taxon names

Antoni Adrover Bennàsar, better known as Rafael Adrover (22 October 1911 – 30 January 2007), was a Spanish paleontologist, schoolteacher, and religious of the Institute of the Brothers of the Christian Schools.

== Academic career ==
Born on 22 October 1911 in the Mallorca town of Felanitx, Antoni Adrover studied to become a Brother of La Salle at the Puente de Inca school, finishing his novitiate in 1927, aged 16, the year in which he also changed his name to Rafael.

Between 1932 and 1933, Adrover, then an elementary education teacher, carried out his mandatory military service, during which he began teaching in his barracks as well, and later mobilized during the Spanish Civil War. He taught in Palma, Alcoi, Pont d'Inca, Barcelona, Teruel, Paterna, and Escuela de Magisterio PI, and later served as director of Santa Margalida. A good musician, Adrover was also a composer and stood out in the practice of the violin and the organ.

== Paleontologist career ==
Adrover was transferred to Barcelona in 1953, to Paterna in 1957, and then to Teruel, in hopes he would improve his health problems. In Teruel, he became interested in paleontology, and especially in micromammals, mice, and fossil insectivores, thus becoming a pioneer in research on the evolution of these large animals. In order to efficiently collect these small fossils (basically teeth), he invented a diverse set of andromines for sifting sediments, with some of his inventions still being used today. In 1965, he returned to his homeland, Mallorca, where he continued his interest in the fauna, publishing eleven articles in the Bolletí de la Societat d'Història Natural de les Balears (SHNB), on the fossil vertebrate fauna of the Pleistocene of Mallorca.

After completing his doctoral degree in paleontology from the University of Lyon, Adrover used Teruel and Mallorca as the fields for his paleontology work, especially for his studies on fossil micromammals. In the early 1970s, he made several summer visits to Lyon, which allowed him to expand and deepen his knowledge of fossil rodents. In 1977, Adrover, together with Sanchiz, found larvae and young frogs in the inaccessible limestone gorges of the Serra de Tramuntana in Mallorca, where they described a species from fossils in the upper Pleistocene as Baleaphryne muletensis, which was believed to have gone extinct following the colonization of the island by man about 4000BC.

During this time, the local researchers Pierre Mein and Margueritte Hugueney spurred him to begin writing his doctoral thesis, which he completed and read in Lyon in 1986, before being published in 1987 by the Instituto de Estudios Turolenses. This thesis is today a reference work in the paleontology of micromammals from the Teruel region. In 2003, Adrover, together with Hugueney, presented the discovery of Tetracus daamsi, a new species of Erinaceidae from the lower Oligocene of Peguera, Mallorca.

== Work ==
- Estudio comparativo de los restos craneanos de Myotragus procedente de la sima de Génova
- Fauna malacológica y mastológica del yacimiento cuaternario de Es Bufador
- Une faunule de mammifères insulaires dans le miocène moyen de majorque
- Mandíbula de Myotragus con dos incisivos y dos premolares
- El Myotragus de Can Sion: Primer esqueleto completo (no compuesto) del rupicáprido endémico de Baleares
- Notes et mémoires
- Nuevas faunas de roedores en el Mio-Plioceno... 1986
- Nuevos micromamíferos en Mallorca
- Pequeñito intento de lavado de las tierras de la cueva de Son Muleta y los resultados obtenidos
- Predadores de la fauna mastológica pleistocénica de Mallorca
- El proceso de masticación en el género Myotragus

== Bibliography ==
- Moyà Solà, Salvador (2006). In memoriam Rafel Adrover, paleontòleg (1911-2007) [In memoriam Rafel Adrover, paleontologist (1911-2007)] (in French). Paris: Bolletí de la Societat d'Història Natural de les Balears. ISSN 2444-8192.
- Adrover, Rafael (1987). Nuevas faunas de roedores en el mio-plioceno continental de la región de Teruel (España): interés bioestratigráfico y paleoecológico [New rodent faunas in the continental Mio-Pliocene of the Teruel region (Spain): biostratigraphic and paleoecological interest] (in French). Lyon: Instituto de Estudios Turolenses. p. 775. ISBN 978-84-505-4872-3.
- Hugueney, Marguerite (1997). La faune de gliridés (Rodentia,Mammalia) de Paguera (Majorque, Espagne): Particularisme dans l'Oligocène Majorquin [The glirididae fauna (Rodentia,Mammalia) of Paguera (Majorca, Spain): Particularism in the Majorcan Oligocene "] (in French). Paris: Geobios. pp. 299–305. ISBN 978-2-296-55969-1.
