= Aljub de la Font Santa =

Font Santa's Well
- Aljub de la Font Santa
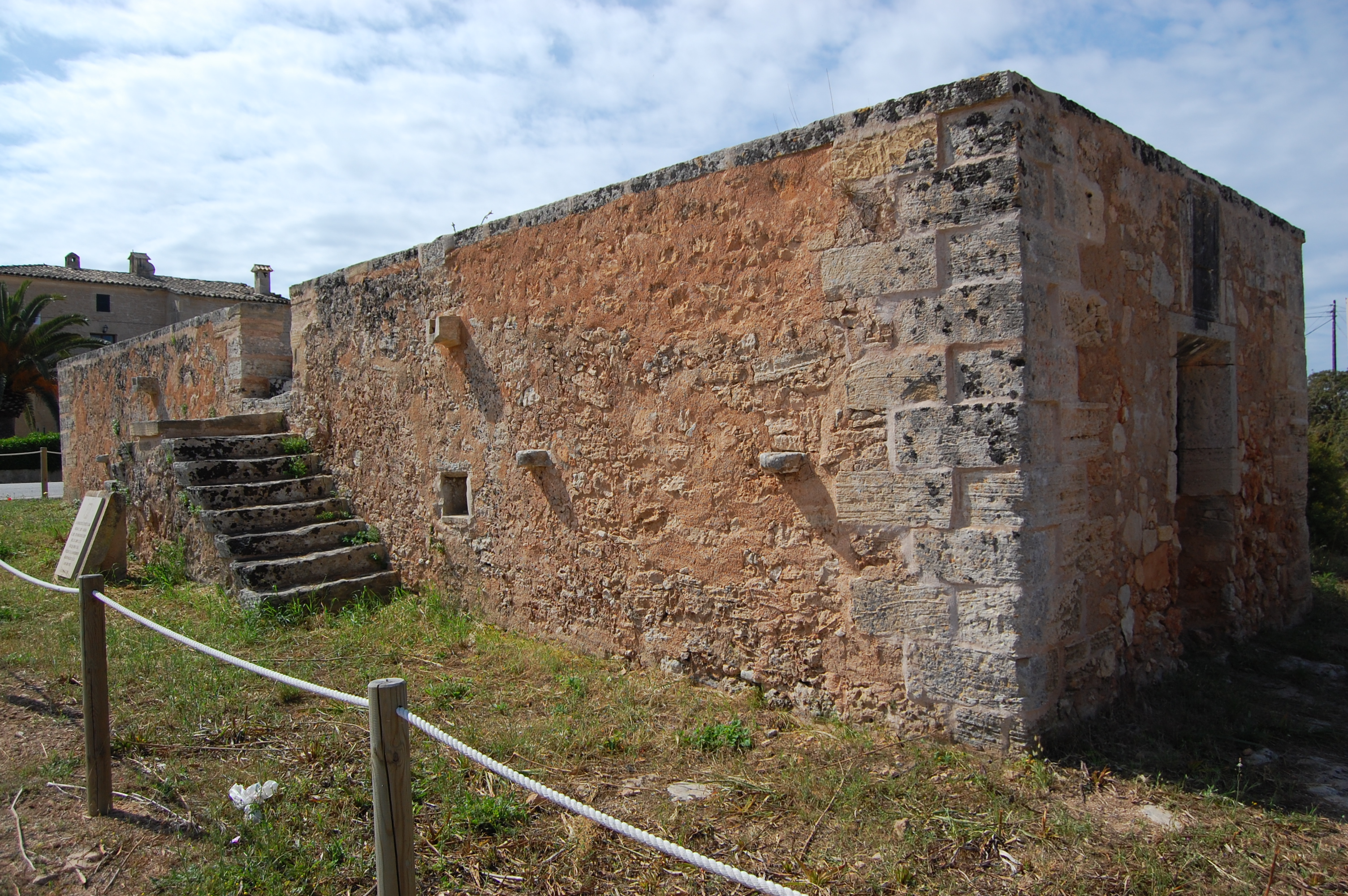
- The building in May 2012
- Interactive map of the Font Santa's Well area
- Alternative names: Aljub des banyos; Aljub de Cas Donat

General information
- Type: Rainwater storage well
- Location: Campos, Majorca, Spain
- Coordinates: 39.3533°N 3.0159°E
- Construction started: 1671
- Completed: 1673
- Client: Juries of Campos
- Owner: Ajuntament de Campos

Aljub de la Font Santa ("Font Santa's Well", also known as Aljub des banyos or Aljub de Cas Donat) is an historic building, housing a rainwater storage well, in the municipality of Campos, Majorca. It was built in 1671–1673, during the restoration of the adjacent Church of Saint Joan de la Font Santa, by remodelling the bathing room of a house known as Ca's Donat.

It used a double filter system and delivered water to external and internal wash basins, as well as drinking troughs for animals.

It had a capacity of 400,000 litres (88,000 imp gal) and was in use until the late nineteenth century.

== Restoration ==
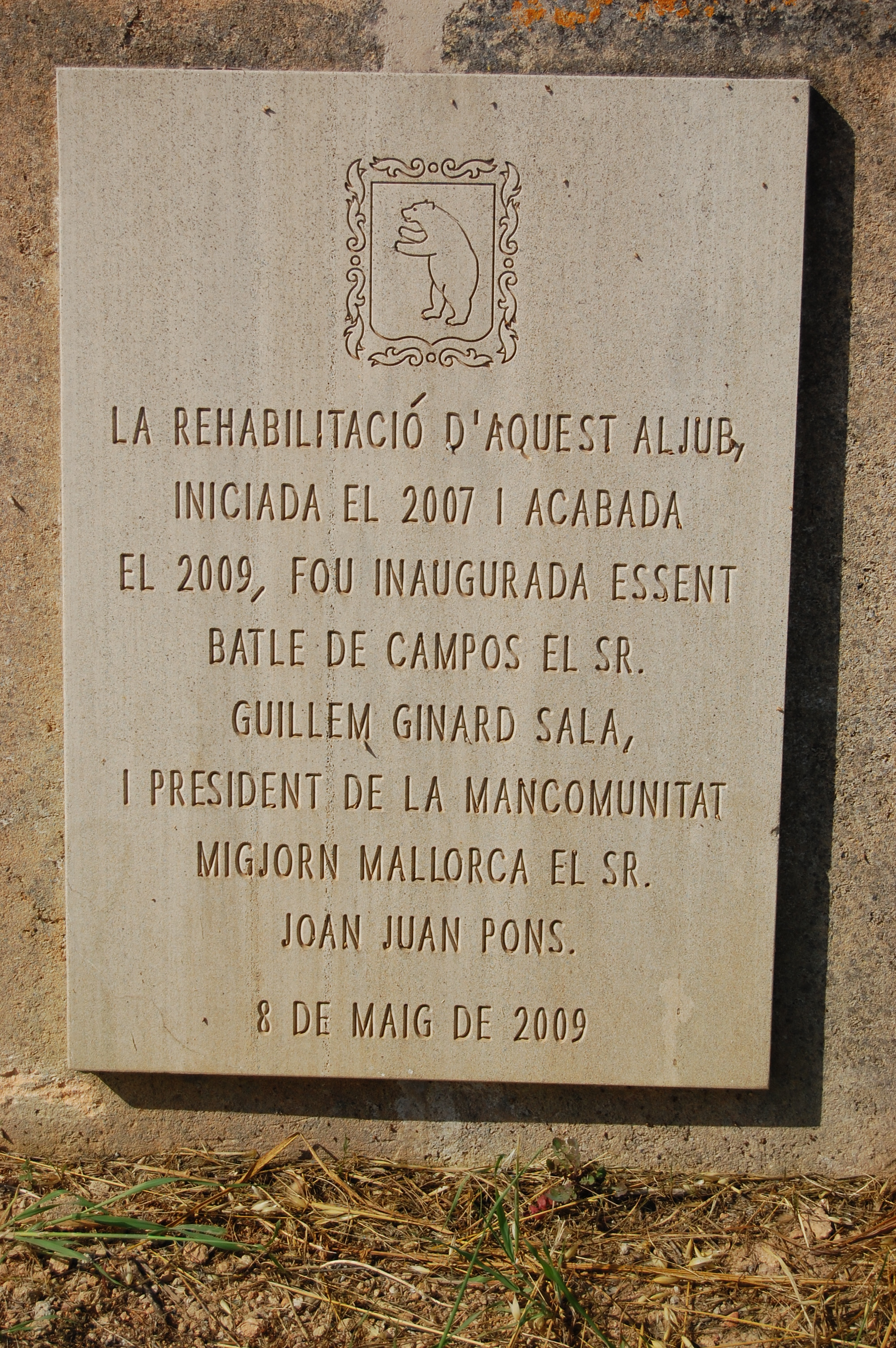
Plaque on the building

The well was restored in 2007–2009. A stone plaque affixed to it states:

The restoration of this well, started in 2007 and completed in 2009, was unveiled by Mayor of Campos Mr. Guillem Ginard Sala and President of the Commonwealth of South Mallorca Mr. Joan Juan Pons. 8 May 2009
