= Migjorn =

County in Balearic Islands, Spain

Coordinates: 39°24′12″N 3°04′27″E

Map of Majorca showing location of Migjorn

Migjorn (Balearic Catalan: [miˈdʒoɾn], Catalan for "South" (Note: Also "Noon")) is a comarca (region) in the island of Mallorca, Balearic Islands, Spain.

== Municipalities ==
It includes the following municipalities:

- Campos
- Felanitx
- Llucmajor
- Ses Salines
- Santanyí
