= Cala Figuera =

District of Santanyí, Mallorca, Spain

Coordinates: 39°20′N 3°10′E

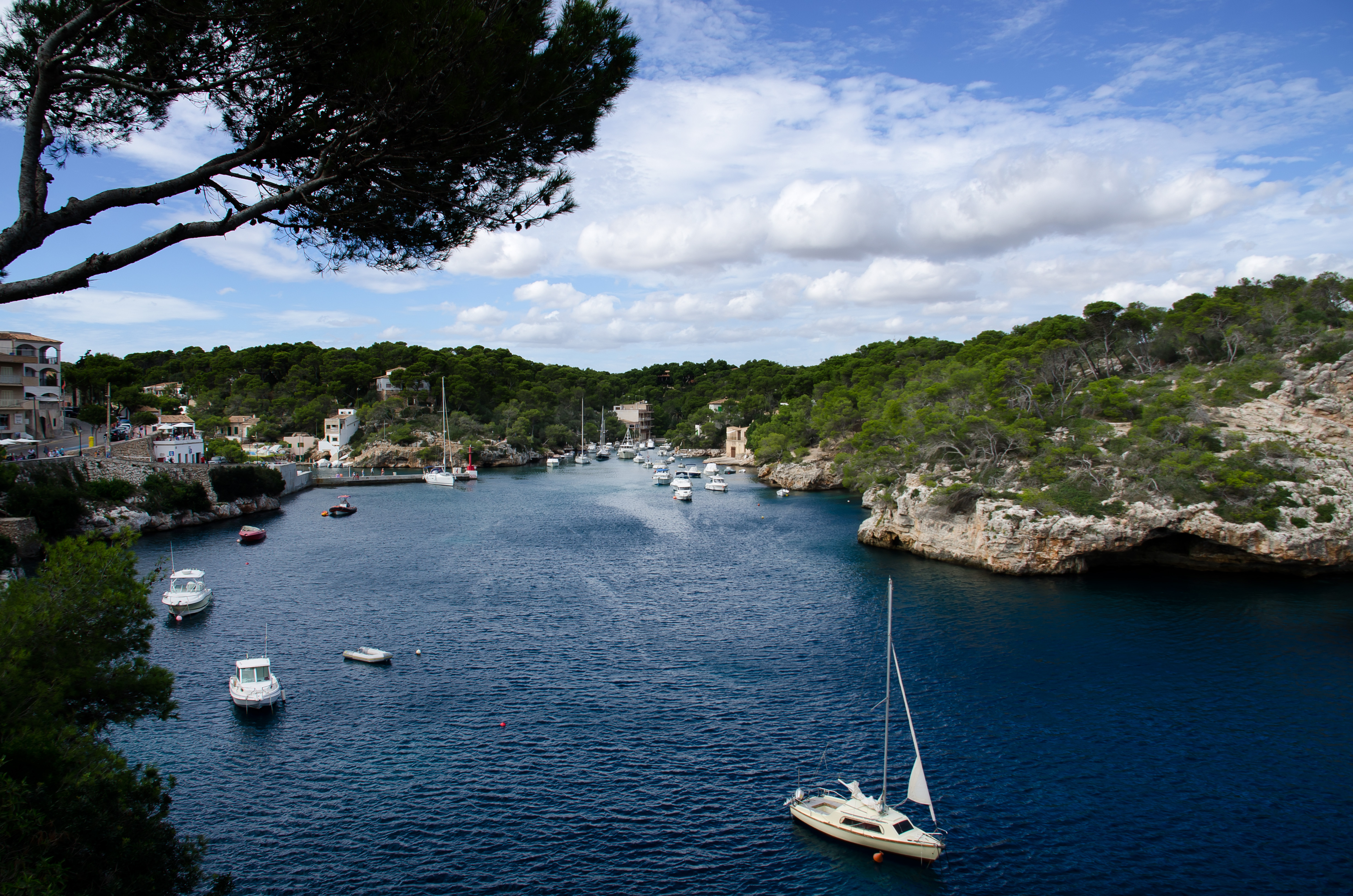
Harbour

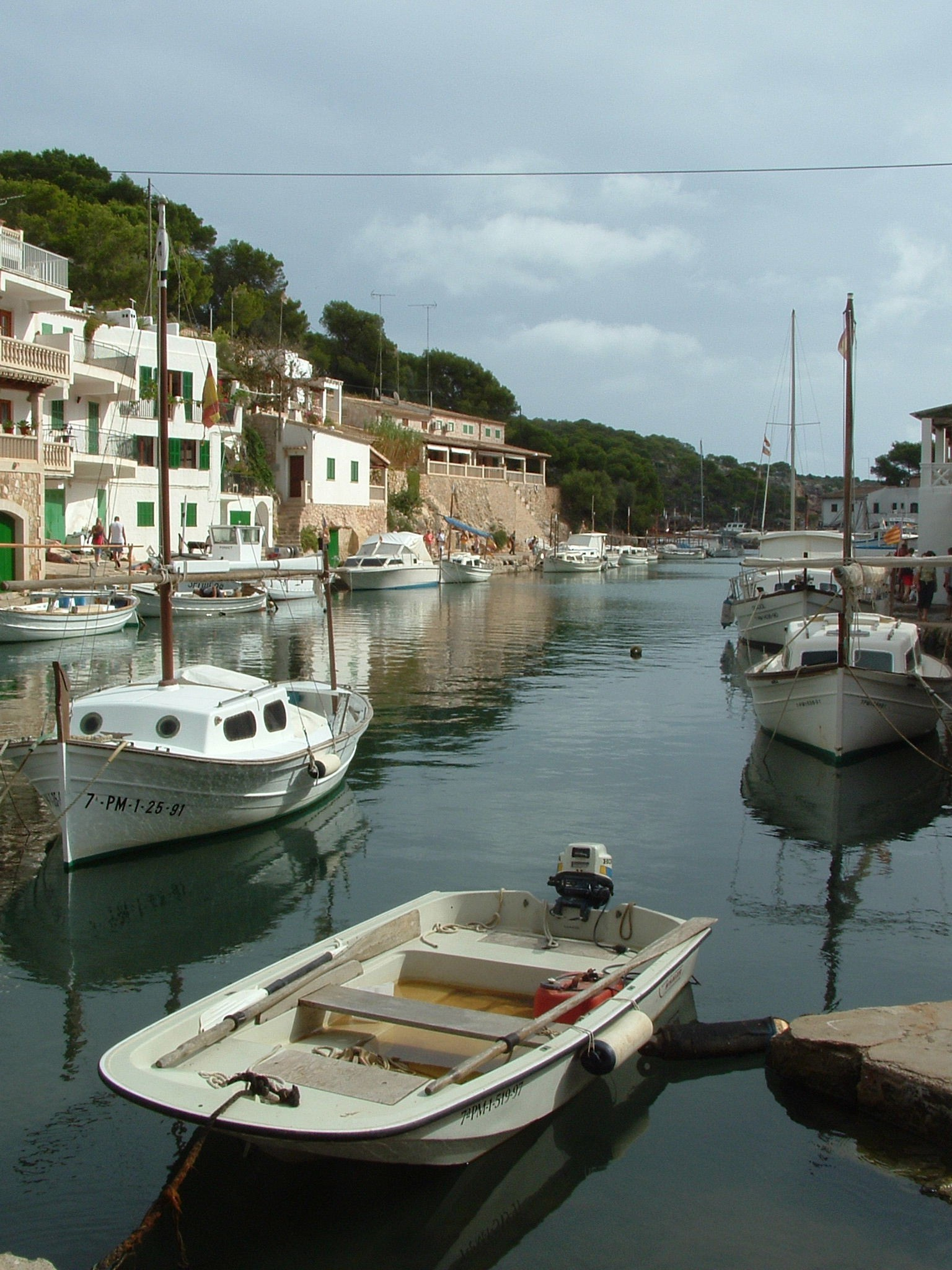
Traditional waterfront houses

Cala Figuera is a district of Santanyí on the island of Mallorca, in the Balearic Islands of Spain, around 60 km to the south east of Palma.

The traditional town was first mentioned in records in 1306 but it was not until the end of the 19th century that the first houses were built in the area. Cala Figuera encompasses a small traditional fishing community of 577 permanent residences which rises during the tourist season when owners of the many high price holiday villas and apartments descend on the town for the summer months.

The town of Cala Figuera stretches from high cliffs to the south of the town to the fishing harbour at the end of a fjord-like inlet which holds some of the most picturesque traditional buildings in the whole of Mallorca, as well as a number of millionaires' mansions overlooking the scenic harbour entrance.

Cala Figuera offers no tourist beaches or easily accessible swimming areas, as a result of which it remains largely untouched by mass tourism.

Even at the height of tourism in the town there were only a handful of medium-sized hotels, the largest of which (the 3 Star Hotel Cala Figuera) was torn down in 2006 to make way for 84 private apartments. Building started in May 2007.

The sheltered port area only caters for a small number of visiting yachts. The harbour is home to a small fleet of local fishing boats which are permitted, by exception, to fish the coastal areas of the Mondragó Natural Parc, a protected wildlife area.
