= Portopetro =

Village in Santanyí, Majorca, Spain

Coordinates: 39.36333°N 3.20667°E

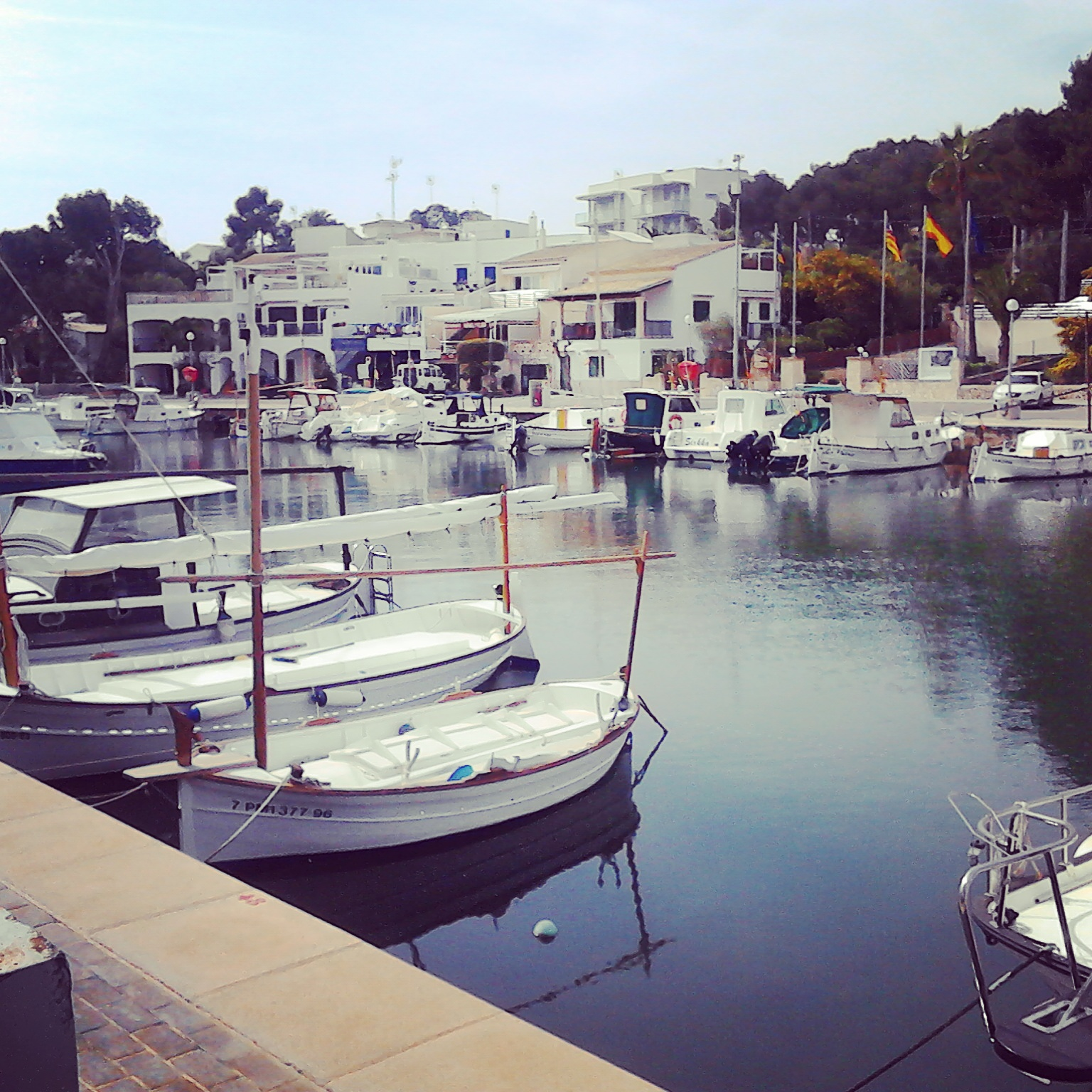

Portopetro is a district of Santanyí on the island of Mallorca, in the Balearic Islands of Spain, around 62 km from Palma.

Portopetro is a small fishing village with a population of approximately 500 and consists of a harbour, small marina and a secluded beach which is adjacent to the harbour. There are a number of restaurants and bars distributed along the harbour's edge serving local and Mediterranean cuisine. Most of its buildings were developed in the 20th century.
