= Ses Salines =

- Municipality
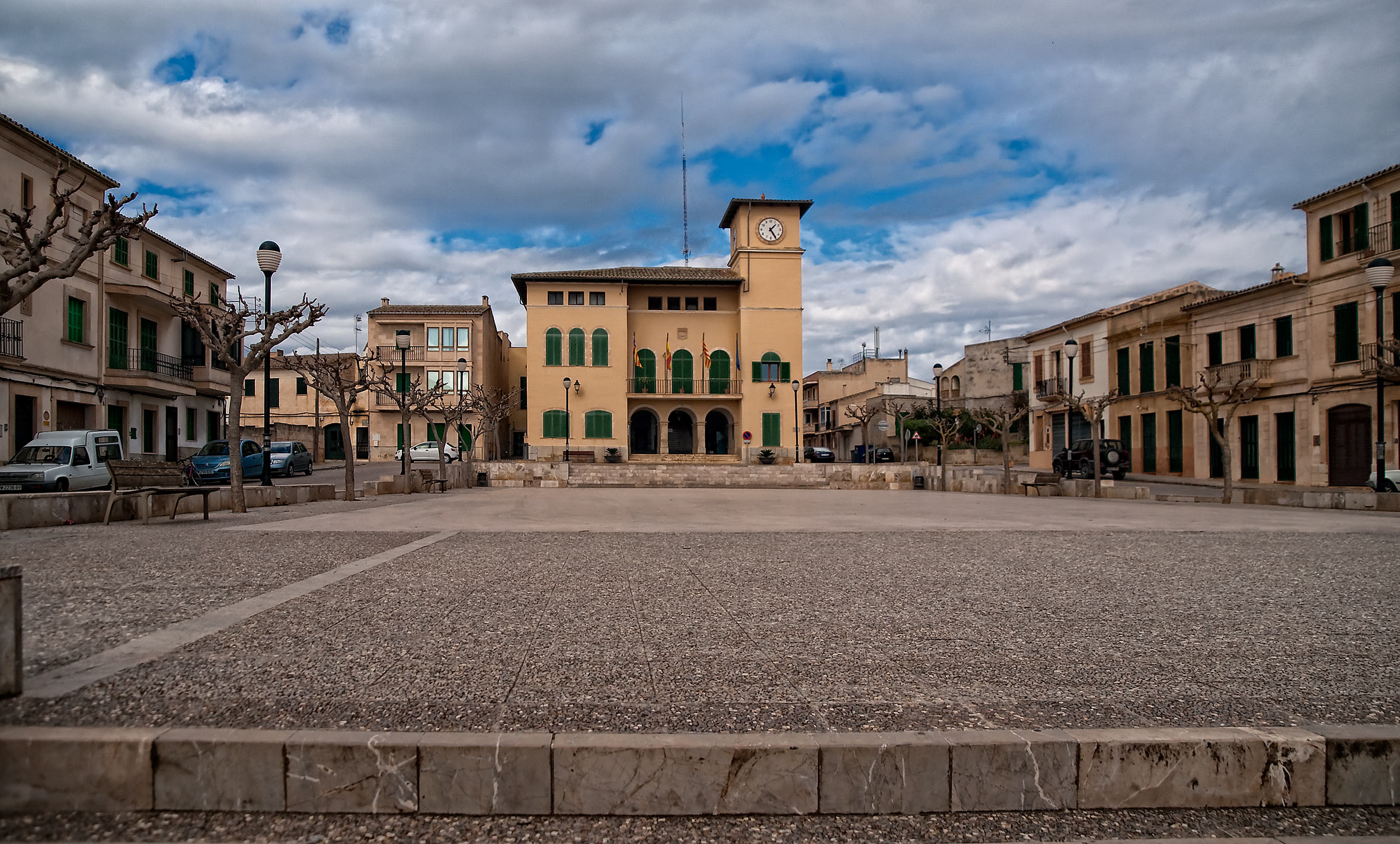

- Flag Coat of arms

- Location of Ses Salines in Mallorca

- Location in Mallorca Ses Salines (Balearic Islands) Ses Salines (Spain)
- Coordinates: 39°20′16.85″N 3°3′3.84″E
- Country: Spain
- Autonomous community: Balearic Islands
- Province: Balearic Islands
- Comarca: Migjorn
- Judicial district: Manacor

Government
  - Mayor: Sebastià Burguera Burguera (PSOE)

Area
  - Total: 39.12 km^{2} (15.10 sq mi)
- Elevation: 53 m (174 ft)

Population (2025-01-01)
  - Total: 5,248
  - Density: 134.2/km^{2} (347.5/sq mi)
- Demonym: Saliner
- Postal code: 07640

Ses Salines (Balearic Catalan: [səs səˈlinəs], locally [sətsəˈlinəs]) is a municipality in the south of Mallorca, one of the Balearic Islands, Spain.
