= Felanitx =

Felanitx Felanich
- Municipality
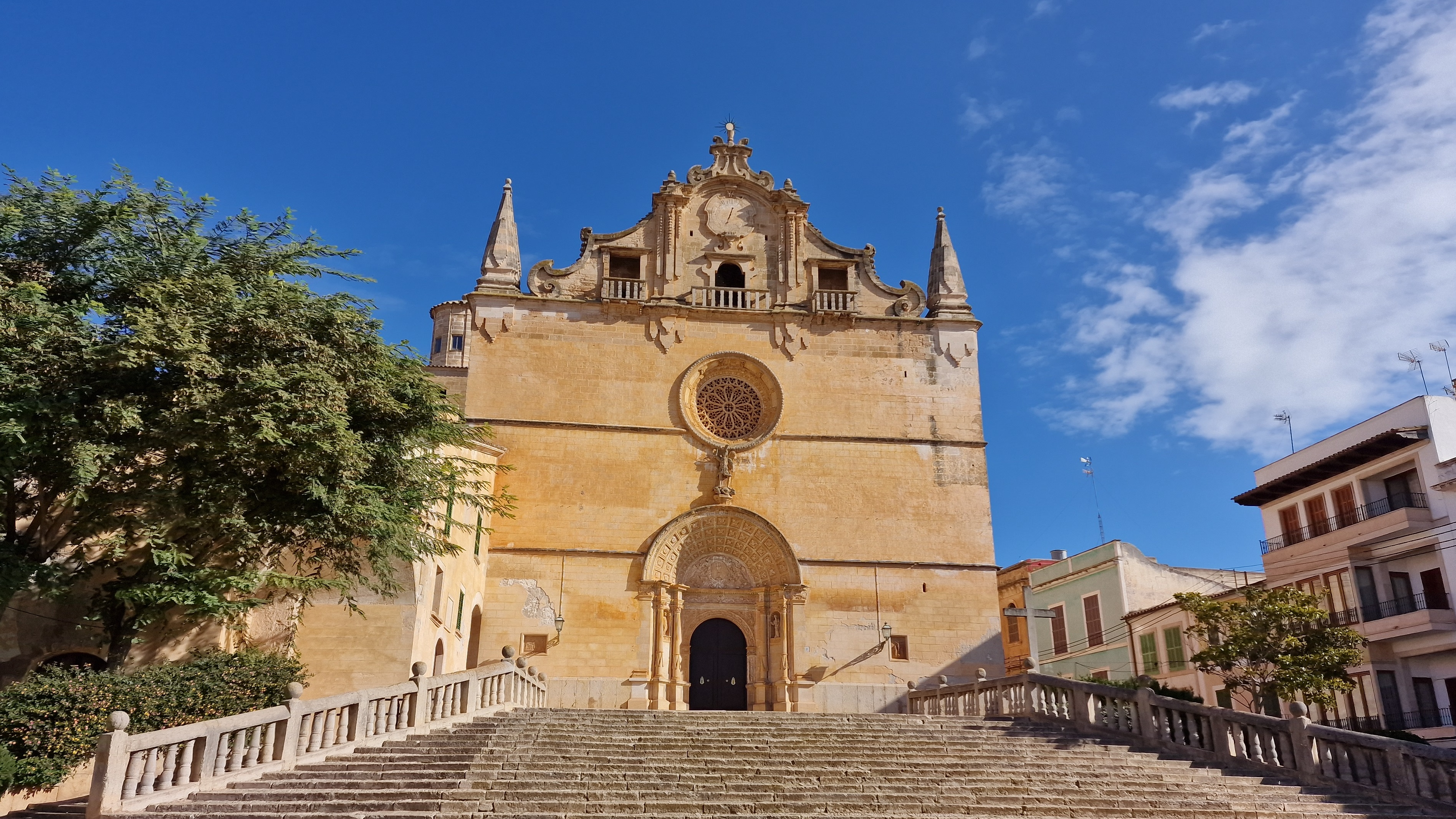

- Flag Coat of arms

- Map of Felantix in Mallorca

- Location in Mallorca Felanitx (Balearic Islands) Felanitx (Spain)
- Coordinates: 39°28′1″N 3°8′54″E
- Country: Spain
- Autonomous community: Balearic Islands
- Province: Balearic Islands
- Comarca: Migjorn
- Judicial district: Manacor

Government
  - Mayor: Gabriel Tauler Riera

Area
  - Total: 169.79 km^{2} (65.56 sq mi)
- Elevation: 95 m (312 ft)

Population (2025-01-01)
  - Total: 19,146
  - Density: 112.76/km^{2} (292.05/sq mi)
- Demonym: Felanitxer
- Time zone: UTC+1 (CET)
  - Summer (DST): UTC+2 (CEST)
- Postal code: 07200
- Website: Official website

Felanitx (Balearic Catalan: [fələˈnitʃ]) is a municipality in the Spanish autonomous community of the Balearic Islands, located in the southeast of Mallorca, 48 kilometres (30 mi) from the capital Palma de Mallorca.

The town, dating back to the 13th century, lies near the medieval Sant Salvador Monastery with its Gothic architecture.

== Culture ==
The St. Agustí convent was founded by Augustinians in the 17th century. In 1881 the Felanitx town council took over the church and celebrates that event every year. It's celebrated by performing Els Cavallets, a dance in which six Cavallets between 10 and 14 years of age, perform dances. The Cavallets wear a cardboard horse around their middles, dressed in a red shirt and a green hat. They dance around La Dama, a girl in a green dress with a red hat. There are nine different dances: es rollet, ses tres potadetes, s'envestida, es canvis, ses cadenilles, es passeig, es pas nou, esses velles and esses noves.

The dances are accompanied by music played on the Xeremia, the Flabiol and the tambourine.

They perform on the days of Santa Margalida and Sant Agustí.

== Economy ==
Felanitx is also known for its wine and particularly its brandy, with over 60 distilleries in the local area recorded in 1749 . It is a center of production of earthenware watercoolers and other pottery since at least the 3rd century BC.

A weekly market takes place in Felanitx every Sunday morning.

== People ==
Felanitx is the birthplace of Miquel Barceló, a contemporary painter.

Other famous people from Felanitx include:

- Guillem Sagrera (1380–1456), Gothic architect and sculptor
- Miquel Bauçà (1940–2004), writer
- Rafael Adrover (1911–2007), paleontologist, schoolteacher, and clergyman
- Guillermo Timoner (1926–2023), world champion cyclist
- Mariona Caldentey (born 1996) world champion football player for the Spanish national team

== Gallery ==
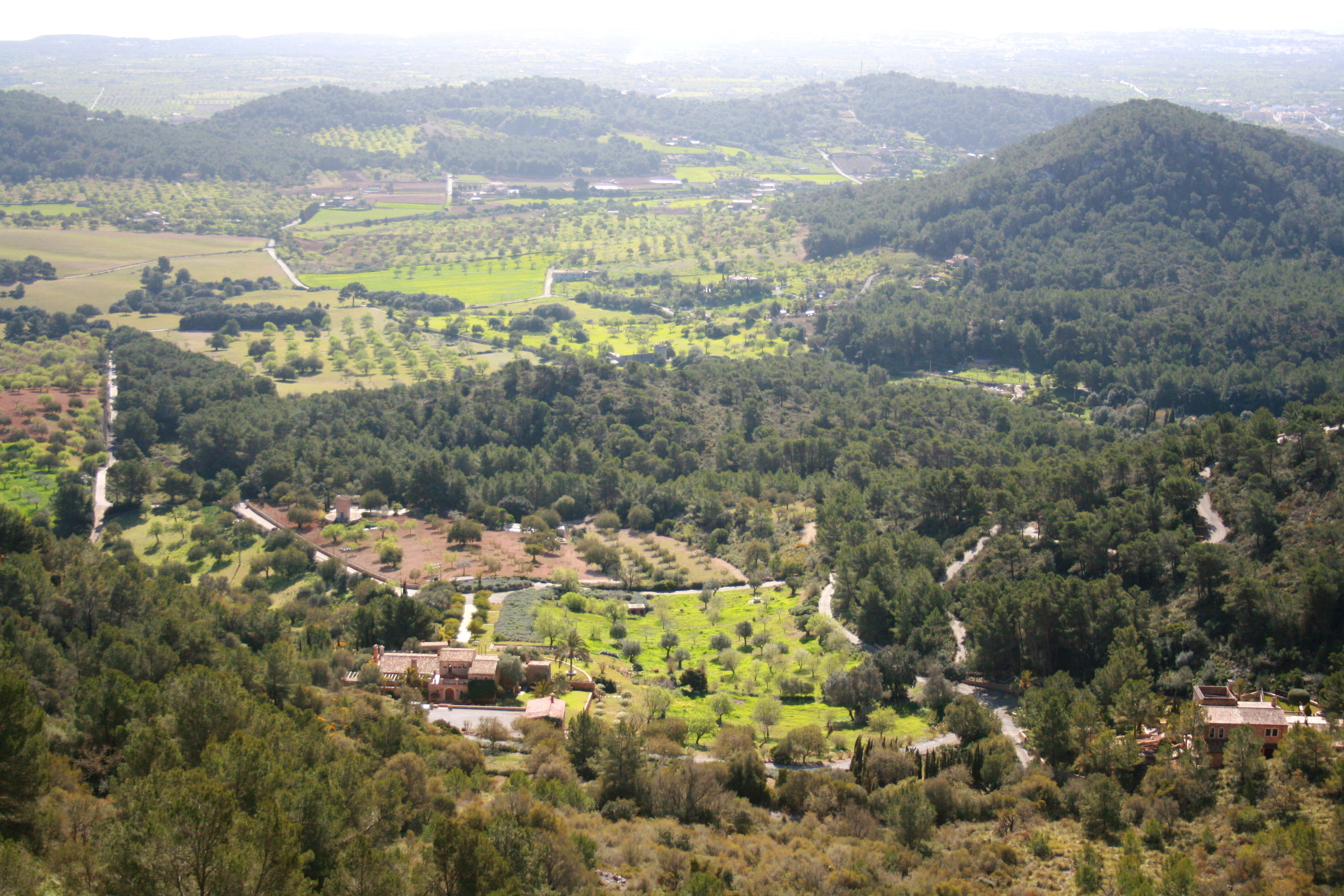
View from Castle of Santueri in Felanitx

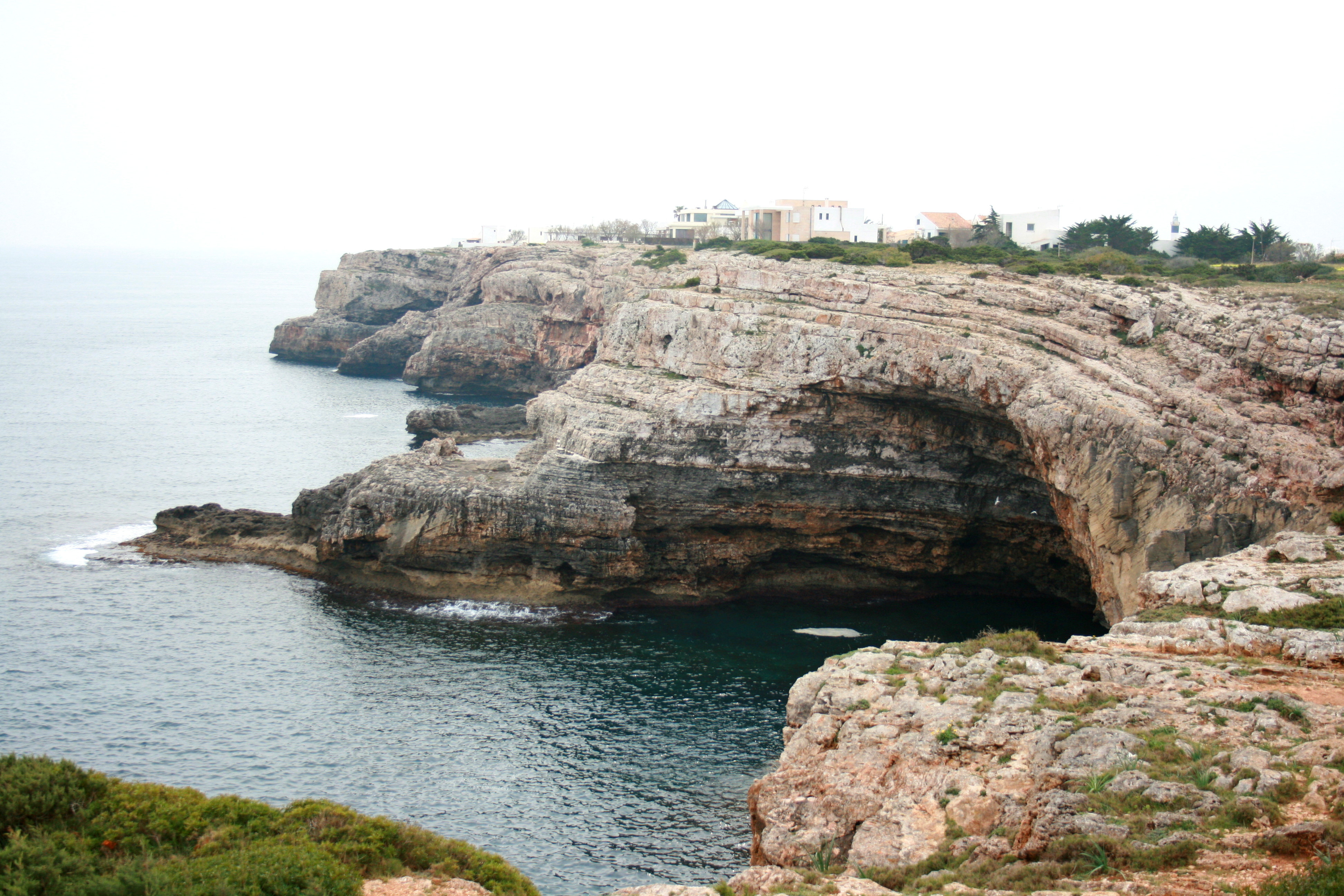
Portocolom, Felanitx

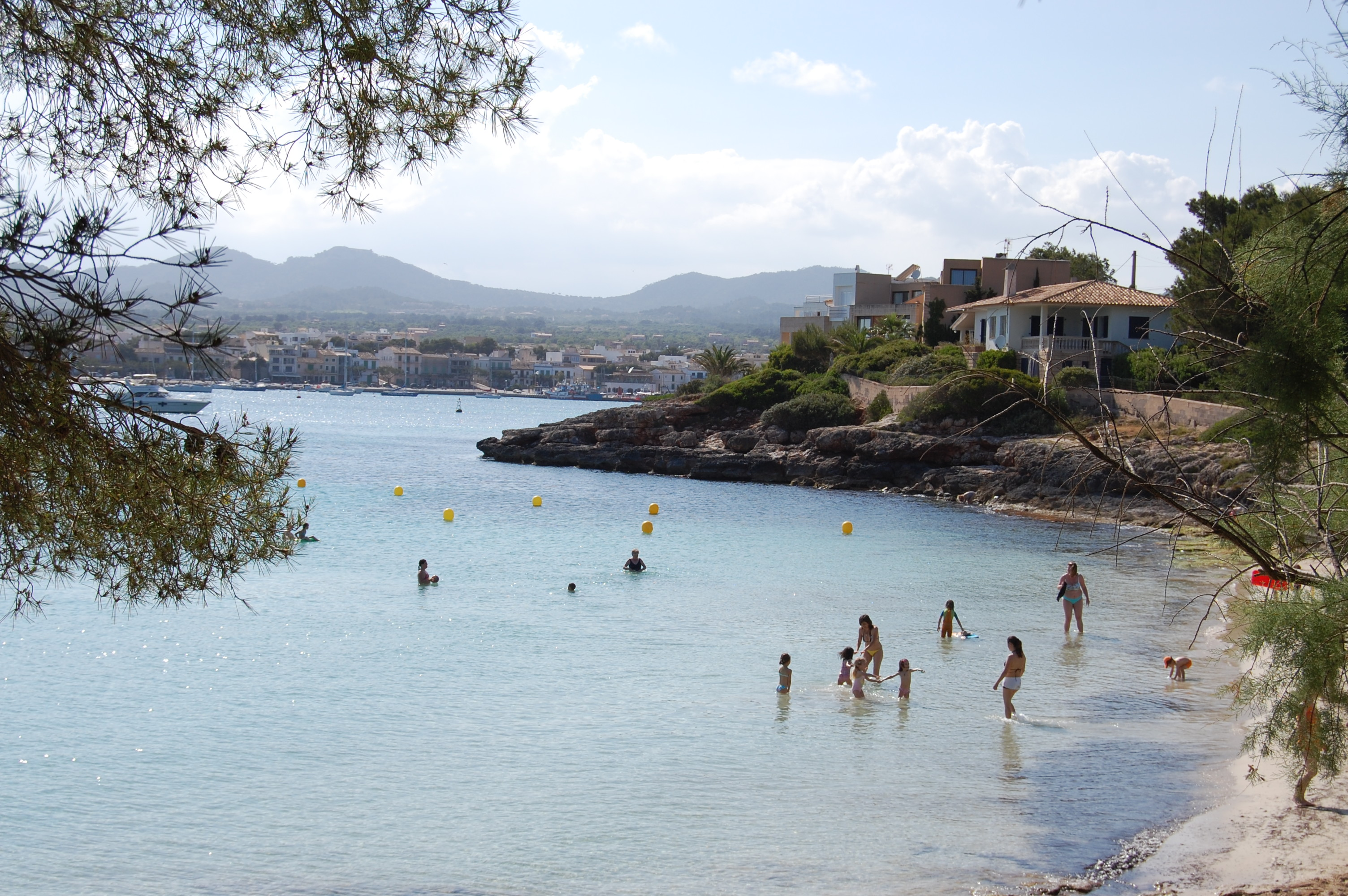
Beach in Portocolom, Felanitx
