= Santanyí =

Municipality on Mallorca, Balearic Islands

Santanyí Santañí
- Municipality
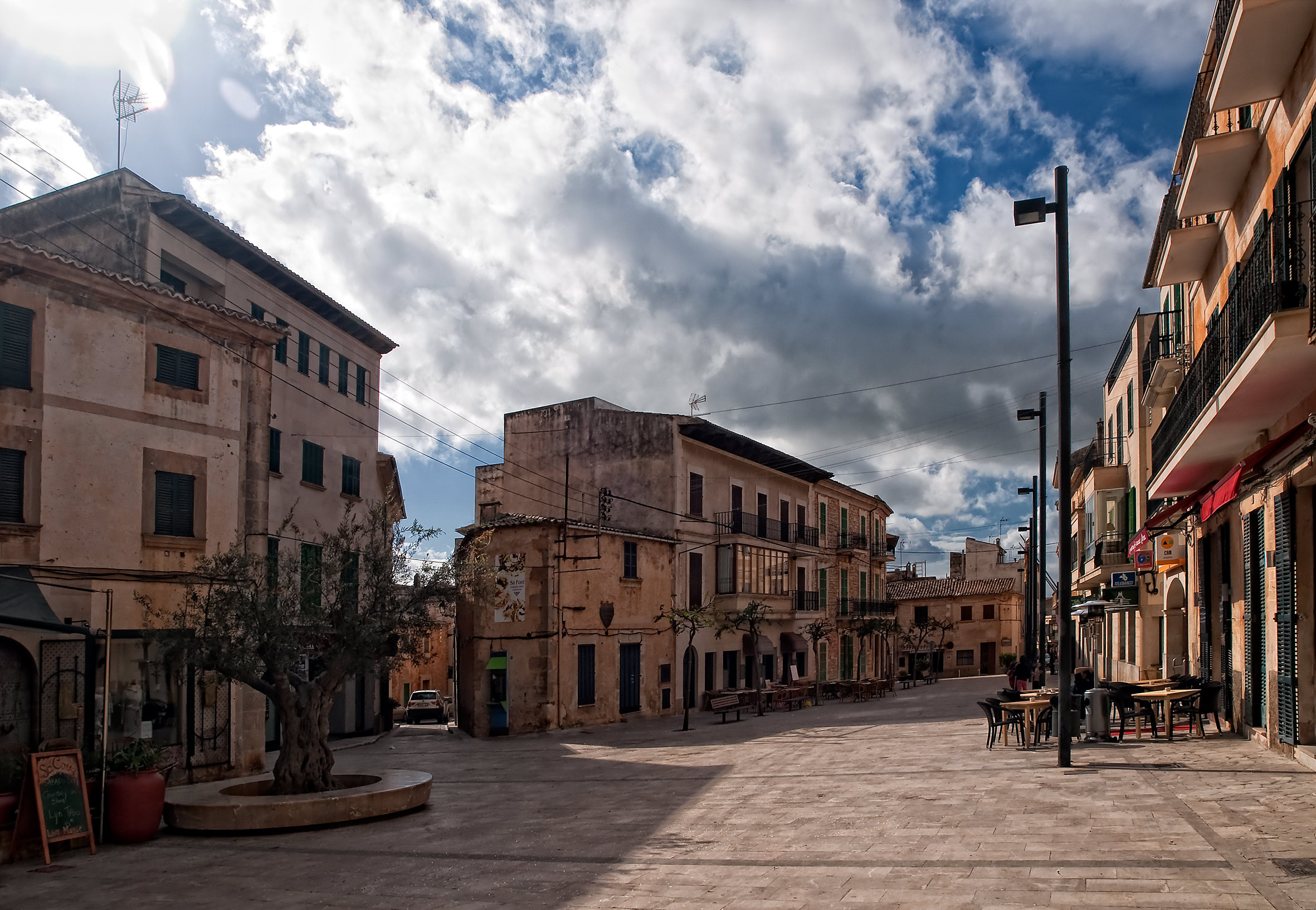
- Plaça Major in Santanyí

- Flag Coat of arms

- Location of Satanyí on Mallorca

- Location in Mallorca Santanyí (Balearic Islands) Santanyí (Spain)
- Coordinates: 39°21′15″N 3°7′42″E

Area
  - Land: 124.47 km^{2} (48.06 sq mi)

Population (2025-01-01)
  - Total: 13,067
  - Density: 89.76/km^{2} (232.5/sq mi)
- Time zone: UTC+1 (CET)
  - Summer (DST): UTC+2 (CEST)
- Website: www.ajsantanyi.net

Santanyí (Balearic Catalan: [səntəˈɲi]) is a municipality on the Spanish island of Mallorca, one of the Balearic Islands, situated in the westernmost part of the Mediterranean Sea.

This municipality in the southeast of Mallorca is home to the towns of Santanyí, Calonge, s'Alqueria Blanca and es Llombards, as well as Cala d'Or, Portopetro, Cap d'es Moro, Cala Figuera, Cala Santanyí, Cala Llombards and Cala de s'Almunia. The municipality encompasses a variety of beaches popular for their scenery. The coast covered by the municipality extends around 35 km (21.8 mi) along the southeast coast of the island. It also holds 172 archaeological sites, evidence of the existence of a productive agriculture and farming tradition since at least the Talaiotic period.

Santanyí is also home to a protected natural area known as the Mondragó Natural Parc.

== Monuments ==
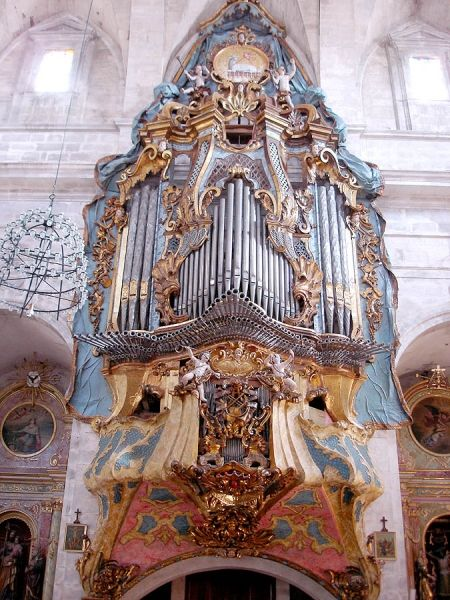
Organ of Santanyi, Mallorca.

The church is famous for its 18th century organ, restored by Gerhard Grenzing.

== Town ==
Town	Inhabitants (2005)¹
S'Alqueria Blanca	936
Cala d'Or	3539
Cala Figuera	577
Calonge	820
La Costa	31
Es Llombards	524
Portopetro	497
Santanyí	2912
Cala Llombards	283
Cala Santanyí	447
Cap d'es Moro	107

^{1} Information from the Spanish National Institute of Statistics

Evolution of the Municipality's population.

	1996	2001	2002	2003	2004	2005
TOTAL	7702	9405	10,020	10,253	10,337	10,673
Men	3862	4801	5151	5230	5260	5405
Women	3840	4604	4869	5023	5077	5268

Source: Balearic Institute of Statistics
