= Mallorca =

Island in the Mediterranean Sea

Coordinates: 39°37′N 2°59′E

- Flag of Mallorca

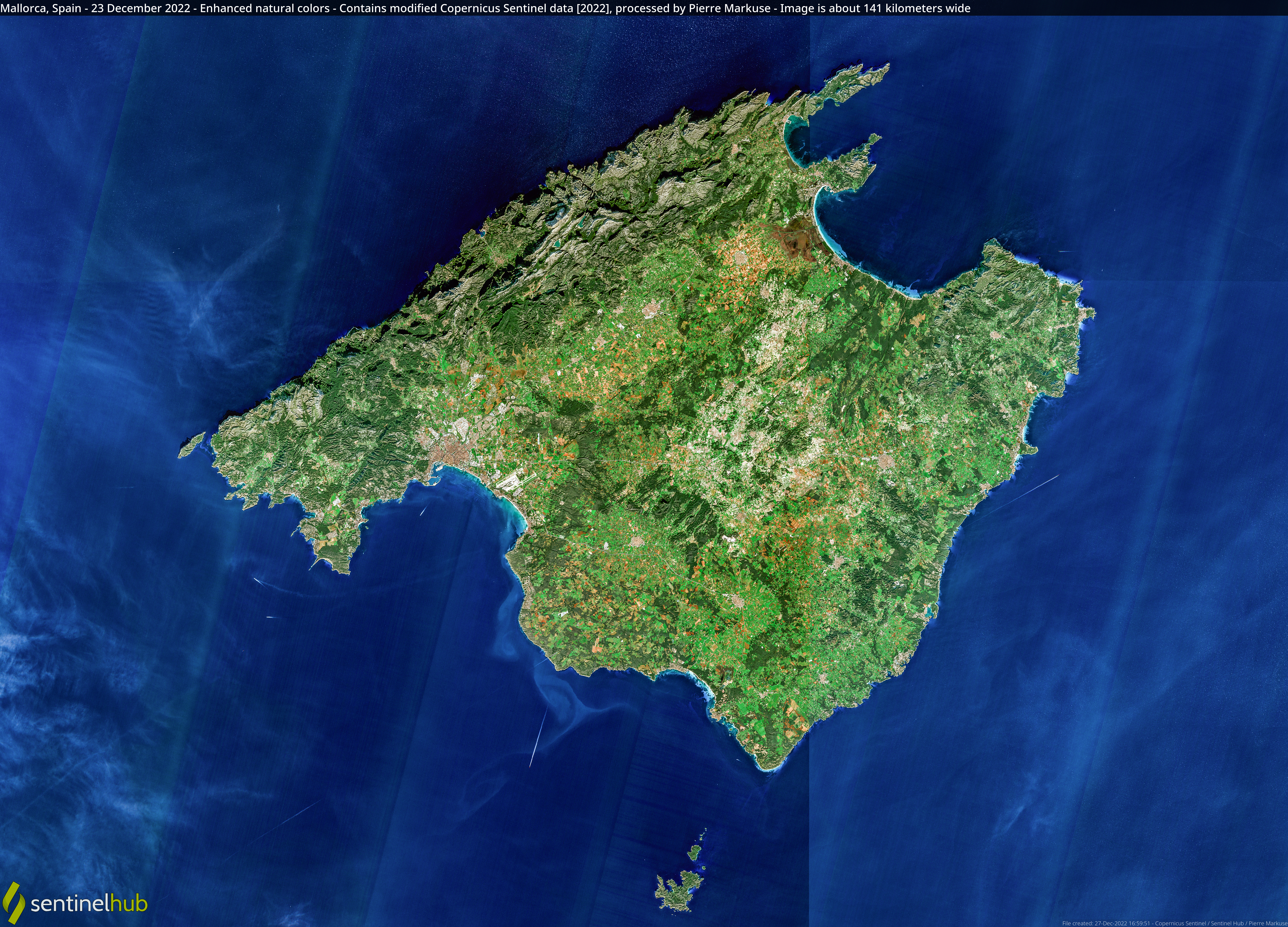
- Sentinel-2 image of Mallorca and Cabrera with enhanced natural colours

- Location within Balearic Islands Location within Spain
- Interactive map of Mallorca

Geography
- Location: Mediterranean
- Archipelago: Balearic Islands
- Total islands: 5
- Major islands: Balearic Islands
- Area: 3,640.11 km^{2} (1,405.45 sq mi)
- Highest elevation: 1,436 m (4711 ft)
- Highest point: Puig Major

Administration
- Spain
- Autonomous Community: Balearic Islands
- Province: Balearic Islands
- Capital and largest city: Palma (pop. 430,640)
- Government: Council of Mallorca
- President: Llorenç Galmés Verger (PP)

Demographics
- Demonym: Mallorcan
- Population: 940,332 (2023 Official estimate)
- Pop. density: 258.33/km^{2} (669.07/sq mi)

Additional information
- Anthem: La Balanguera

Historical affiliations

- Carthage 4th century BC – 201 BC
- Roman Republic 123–27 BC
- Roman Empire 27 BC – 455 AD
- Vandal Kingdom 455–534
- Byzantine Empire 534–903
- Umayyad state of Córdoba 903–1015
- Taifa of Dénia 1015–1076
- Taifa of Majorca 1076–1115
- Almoravid dynasty 1115–1158
- Taifa of Majorca 1158–1203
- Almohad Caliphate 1203–1229
- Crown of Aragon 1229–1276
- Kingdom of Mallorca 1276–1343
- Crown of Aragon 1343–1715
- Kingdom of Spain 1715–1808
- Kingdom of Spain 1813–1931
- Second Spanish Republic 1931–1936
- Spanish State 1936–1978
- Spain 1978–present

Mallorca, (Note: Balearic Catalan: [məˈʎɔɾkə], [məˈʎɔɾcə]; Spanish: [maˈʎoɾka]) also spelled Majorca in English, (Note: English: /məˈjɔːrkə, maɪ-, -ˈdʒɔːr-/, mə-YOR-kə, my-, -JOR-) is the largest of Spain's Balearic Islands, and the seventh largest island in the Mediterranean Sea.

Its capital, Palma, is also the capital of the autonomous community of the Balearic Islands. The Balearic Islands have been an autonomous region of Spain since 1983. Two smaller islands lie just off the coast of Mallorca: Cabrera (southeast of Palma) and Dragonera (west of Palma). The island's anthem is "La Balanguera".

Along with other Balearic Islands, Menorca, Ibiza, and Formentera, Mallorca is a highly popular holiday destination, particularly for tourists from the Netherlands, Ireland, Germany, and the United Kingdom. The international airport, Palma de Mallorca Airport, is one of the busiest in Spain; it was used by 28 million passengers in 2017, with use increasing every year between 2012 and 2017.

== Etymology ==
The name originates from Classical Latin insula maior, meaning "larger island". In Medieval Latin, this evolved into Maiorca, referring to "the larger one" in contrast with Menorca, "the smaller one". The term Maiorca was later modified by central Catalan scribes through a process of hypercorrection, resulting in the form Mallorca, which eventually became the standard spelling.

== History ==
=== Prehistoric settlements ===
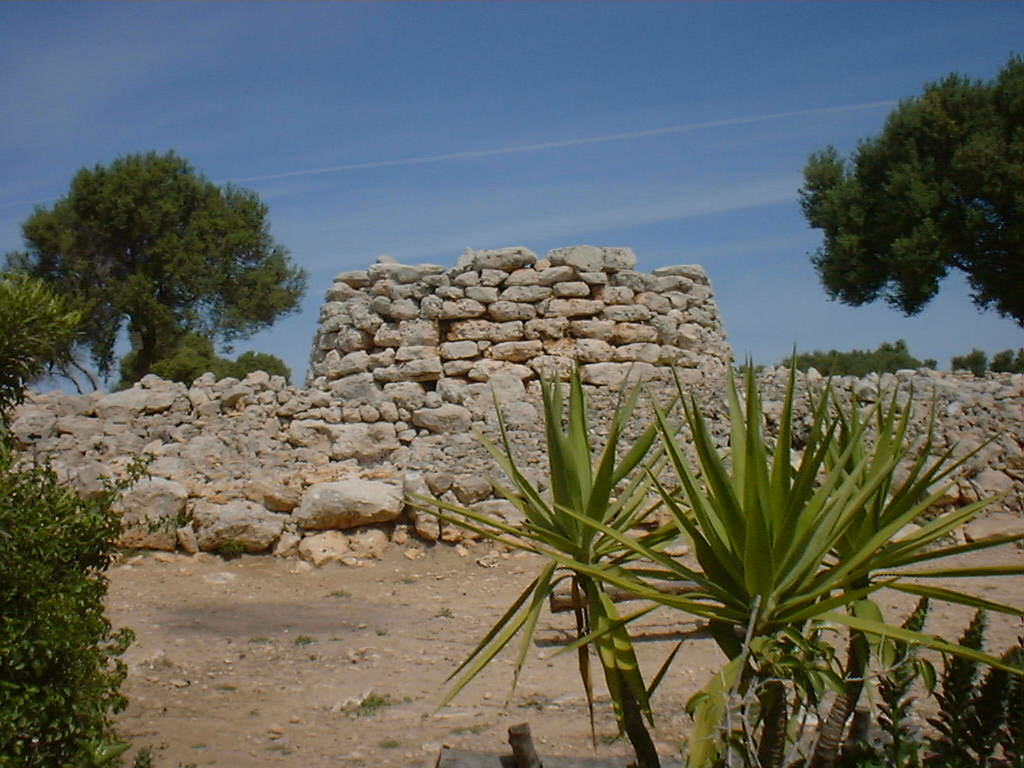
Example of prehistoric talaiot in Mallorca

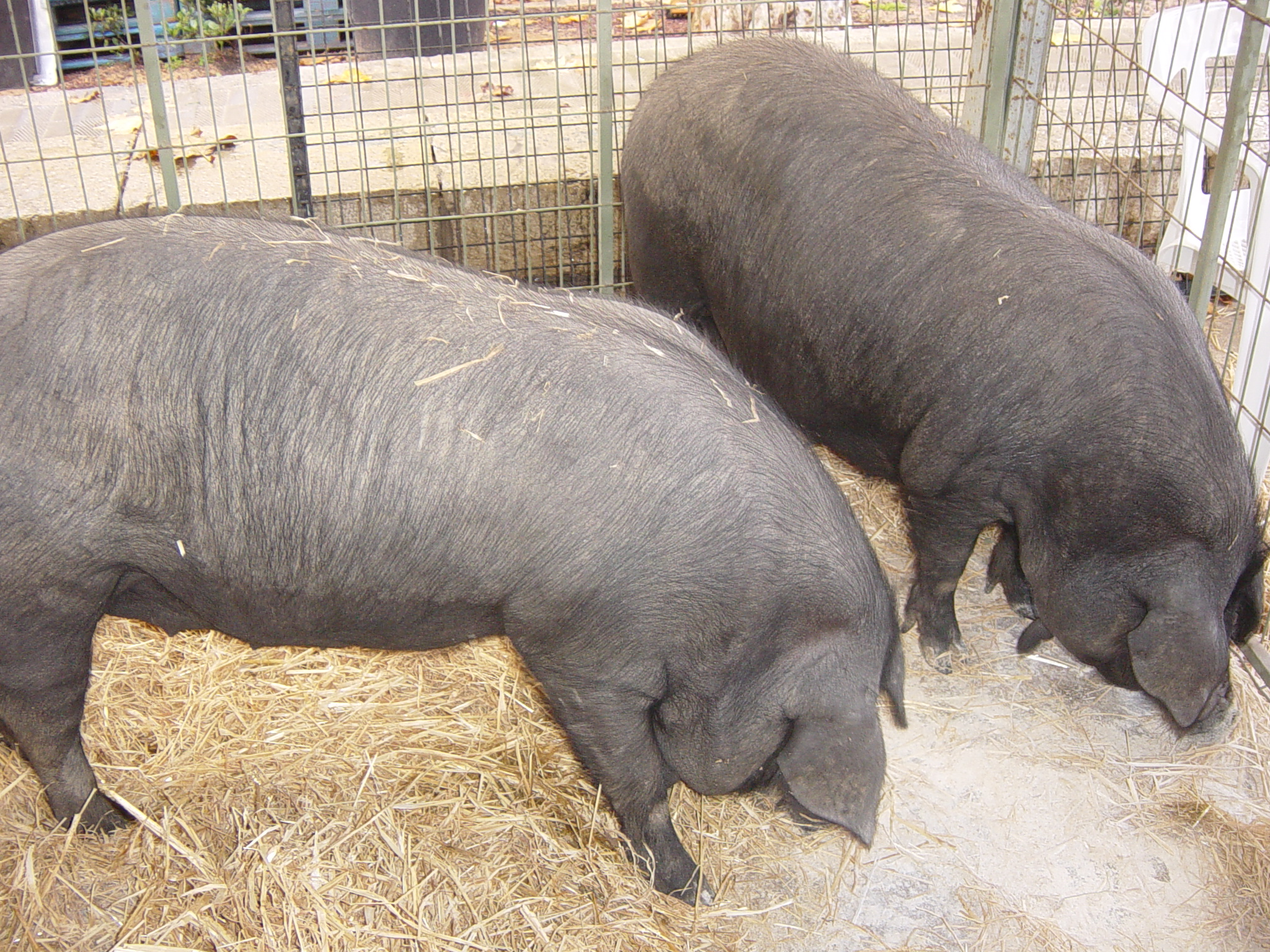
Archeological evidence indicates the presence of the porc negre (black pig) in pre-Roman settlements.

The Balearic Islands were first colonised by humans during the 3rd millennium BC, around 2500–2300 BC from the Iberian Peninsula or southern France, by people associated with the Bell Beaker culture. The arrival of humans resulted in the rapid extinction of the three species of terrestrial mammals native to Mallorca, the dwarf goat-antelope Myotragus balearicus, the giant dormouse Hypnomys morpheus, and the shrew Nesiotites hidalgo, all three of which had been continuously present on Mallorca for over 5 million years. The island's prehistoric settlements are called talaiots or talayots. The people of the islands raised Bronze Age megaliths as part of their Talaiotic culture. A non-exhaustive list of settlements is the following:

- Capocorb Vell (Llucmajor municipality)
- Necròpoli de Son Real (east of Can Picafort, Santa Margalida municipality)
- Novetiforme Alemany (Magaluffa, Calvià, Miconio)
- Poblat Talaiòtic de S'Illot (S'Illot, Sant Llorenç des Cardassar municipality)
- Poblat Talaiòtic de Son Fornés (Montuïri municipality)
- Sa Canova de Morell (road to Colònia de Sant Pere, Artà municipality)
- Ses Païsses (Artà municipality)
- Ses Talaies de Can Jordi (Santanyí municipality)
- S'Hospitalet Vell (road to Cales de Mallorca, Manacor municipality)

=== Phoenicians, Romans, and Late Antiquity ===
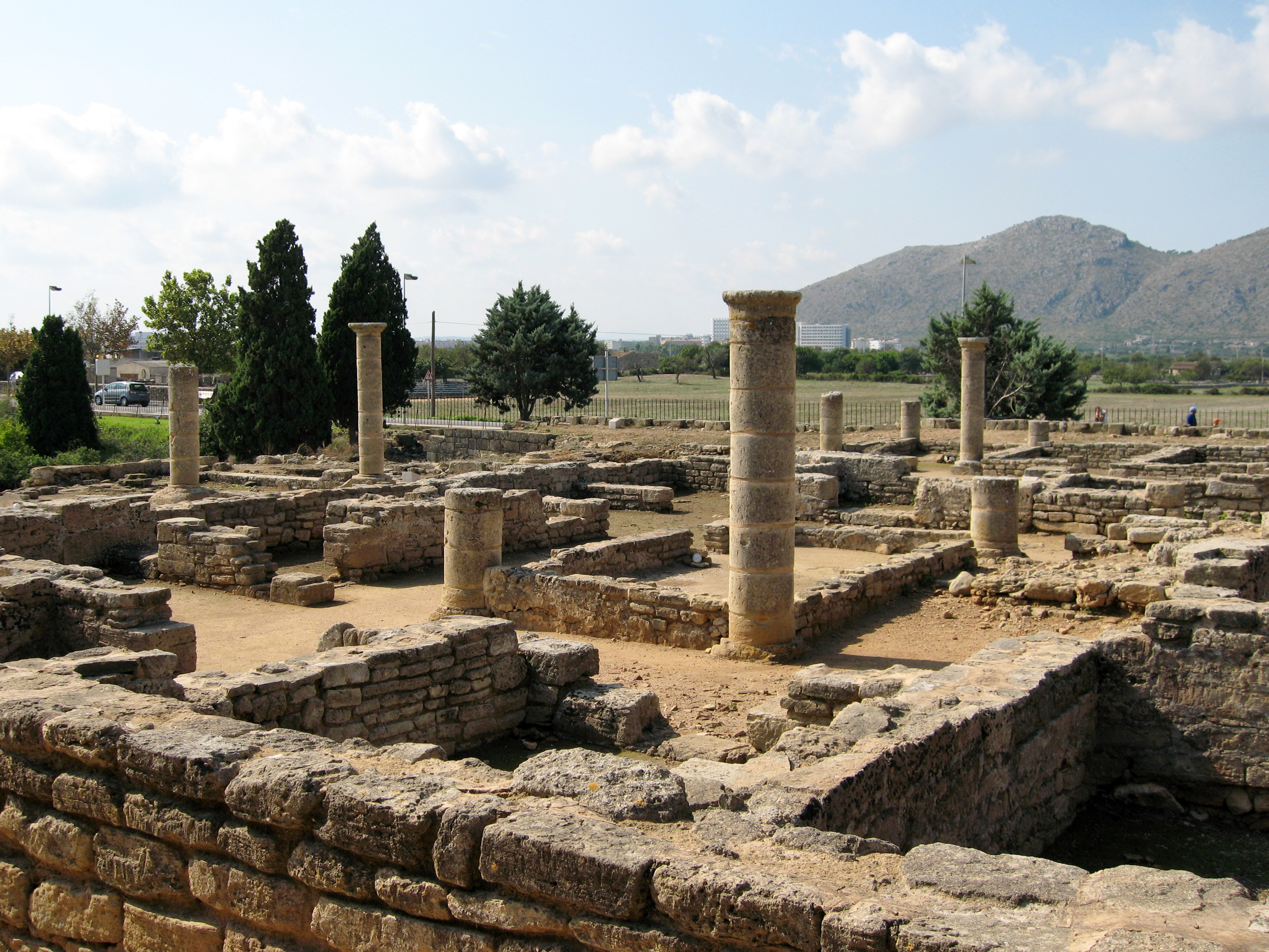
Ruins of the Roman city of Pollentia

The Phoenicians, a seafaring people from the Levant, arrived around the eighth century BC and established numerous colonies. The island eventually came under the control of Carthage in North Africa, which had become the principal Phoenician city. After the Second Punic War, Carthage lost all of its overseas possessions and the Romans took over.

The island was occupied by the Romans in 123 BC under Quintus Caecilius Metellus Balearicus. It flourished under Roman rule, during which time the towns of Pollentia (Alcúdia), and Palmaria (Palma) were founded. In addition, the northern town of Bocchoris, dating back to pre-Roman times, was a federated city to Rome. The local economy was largely driven by olive cultivation, viticulture, and salt mining. Mallorcan soldiers were valued within the Roman legions for their skill with the sling (Balearic slingers).

In 427, Gunderic and the Vandals captured the island. Geiseric, son of Godigisel, governed Mallorca and used it as his base to loot and plunder settlements around the Mediterranean until Roman rule was restored in 465.

=== Middle Ages ===
==== Late Antiquity and Early Middle Ages ====
In 534, Mallorca was recaptured from the Vandals by the Eastern Roman Empire, led by Apollinarius. Under Roman rule, Christianity thrived and numerous churches were built.

From 707, the island was increasingly attacked by Muslim raiders from North Africa. Recurrent invasions led the islanders to ask Charlemagne for help.

==== Islamic Mallorca ====
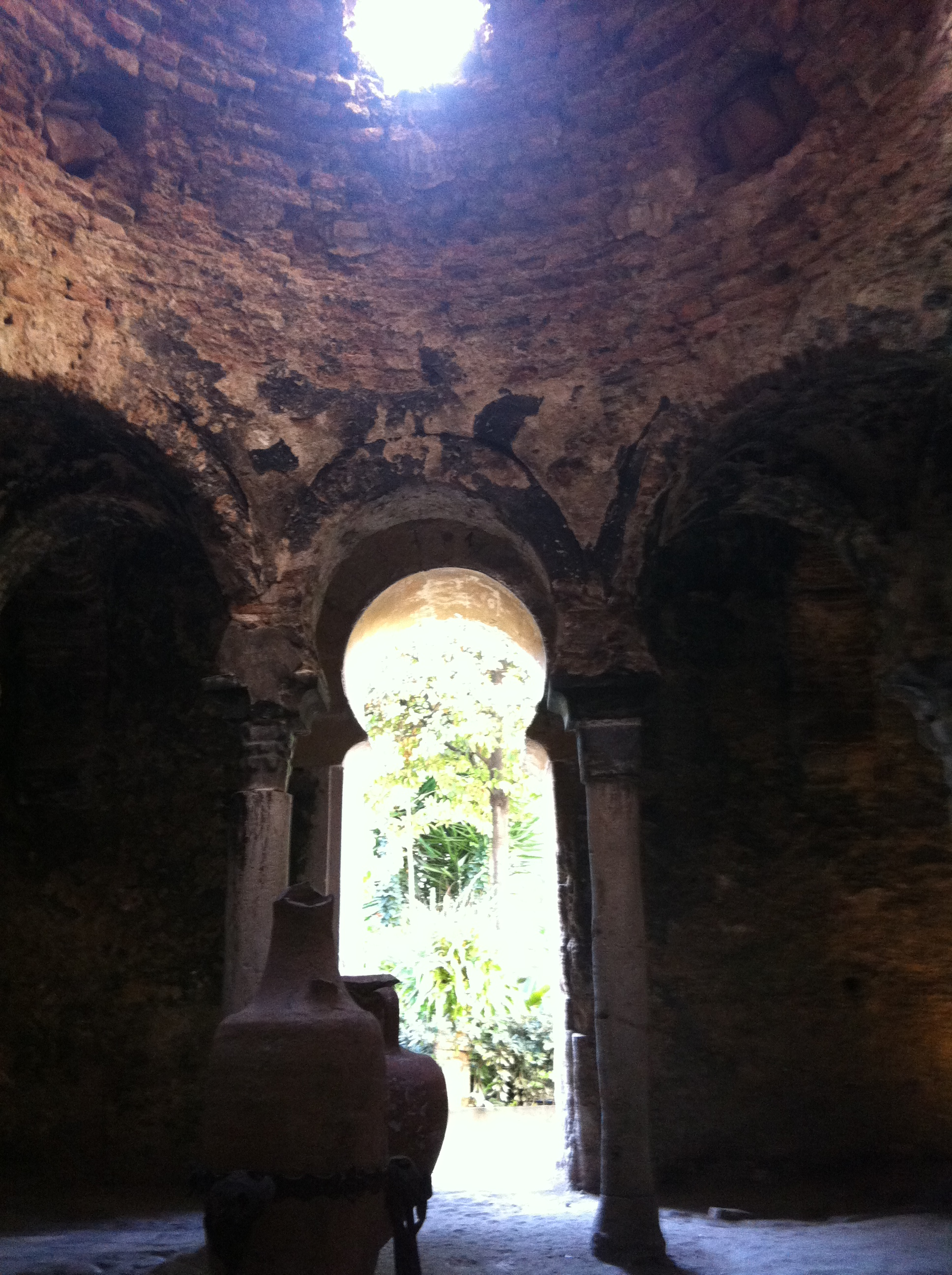
Arab Baths in Palma

In 902, Issam al-Khawlani^{(es)(ca)} (Arabic: عصام الخولاني) conquered the Balearic Islands, and they became part of the Emirate of Córdoba. The town of Palma was reshaped and expanded, and became known as Medina Mayurqa. Later on, with the Caliphate of Córdoba at its height, the Muslims improved agriculture with irrigation and developed local industries.

The caliphate was dismembered in 1015. Mallorca came under rule by the Taifa of Dénia, and from 1087 to 1114, was an independent Taifa. During that period, the island was visited by Ibn Hazm. However, an expedition of Pisans and Catalans in 1114–15, led by Ramon Berenguer III, Count of Barcelona, overran the island, laying siege to Palma for eight months. After the city fell, the invaders retreated due to problems in their own lands. They were replaced by the Almoravides from North Africa, who ruled until 1176. The Almoravides were replaced by the Almohad dynasty until 1229. Abu Yahya was the last Moorish leader of Mallorca.

==== Medieval Mallorca ====
In the ensuing confusion and unrest, King James I of Aragon, also known as James the Conqueror, launched an invasion which landed at Santa Ponça, Mallorca, on 8–9 September 1229 with Catalan forces consisting of 15,000 men and 1,500 horses. His forces entered the city of Medina Mayurqa on 31 December 1229. In 1230, he annexed the island to his Crown of Aragon under the name Regnum Maioricae.

=== Modern era ===
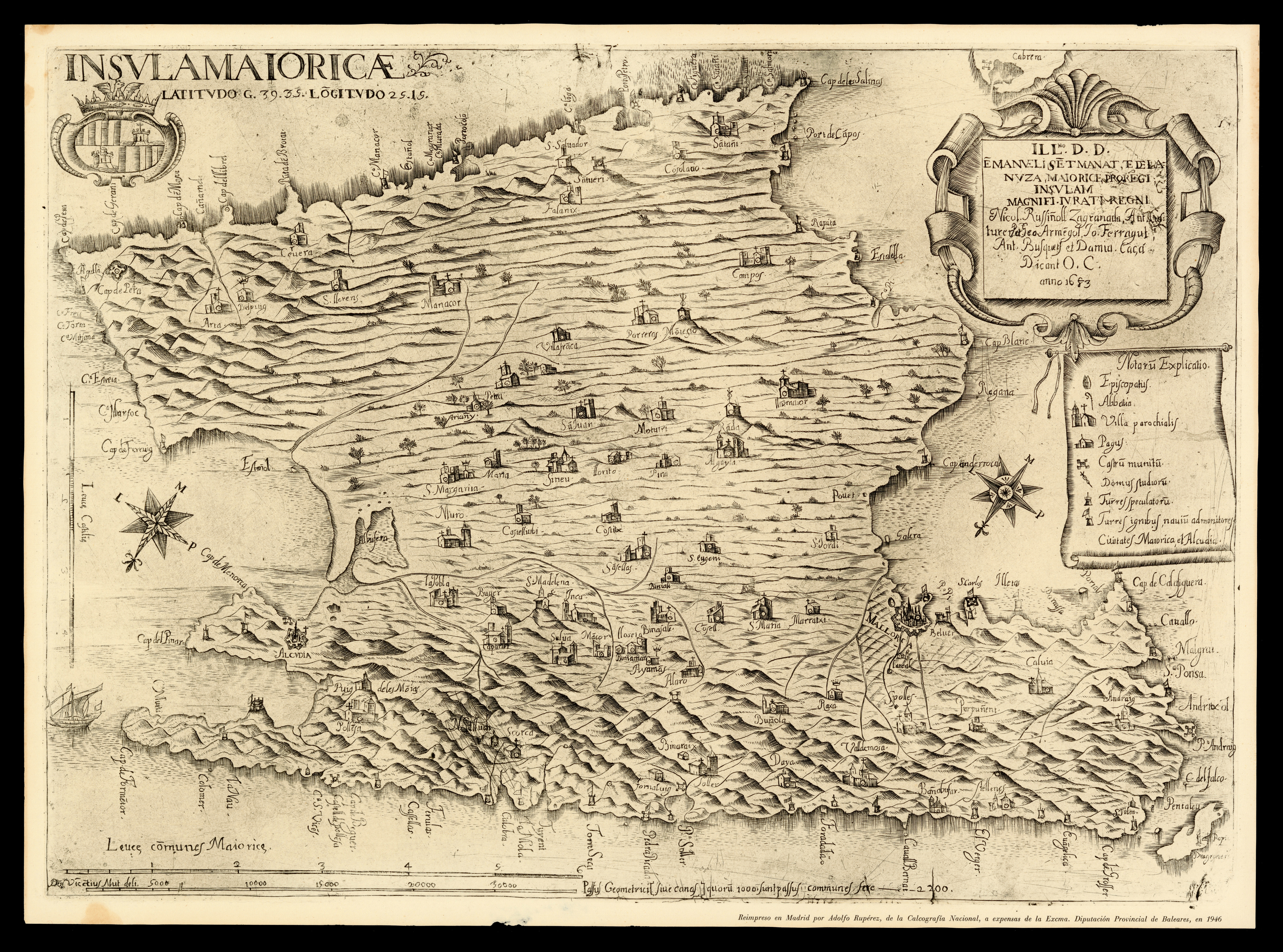
A 1683 map of Mallorca, by Vicente Mut

From 1479, the Crown of Aragon was in dynastic union with that of Castile. The Barbary corsairs of North Africa often attacked the Balearic Islands, and in response, the people built coastal watchtowers and fortified churches. In 1570, King Philip II of Spain and his advisors were considering complete evacuation of the Balearic islands.

In the early 18th century, the War of the Spanish Succession resulted in the replacement of that dynastic union with a unified Spanish monarchy under the rule of the new Bourbon Dynasty. The last episode of the War of Spanish Succession was the conquest of the island of Mallorca. It took place on 2 July 1715 when the island capitulated to the arrival of a Bourbon fleet. In 1716, the Nueva Planta decrees made Mallorca part of the Spanish province of Baleares, roughly the same to present-day Illes Balears province and autonomous community.

=== 20th century and today ===
A Nationalist stronghold at the start of the Spanish Civil War, Mallorca was subjected to an amphibious landing, on 16 August 1936, aimed at driving the Nationalists from Mallorca and reclaiming the island for the Republic. Although the Republicans heavily outnumbered their opponents and managed to push 12 km (7.5 mi) inland, superior Nationalist air power, provided mainly by Fascist Italy as part of the Italian occupation of Mallorca, forced the Republicans to retreat and to leave the island completely by 12 September. Those events became known as the Battle of Mallorca.

Since the 1950s, the advent of mass tourism has transformed the island into a destination for foreign visitors and attracted many service workers from mainland Spain. The boom in tourism caused Palma to grow significantly.

In the 21st century, urban redevelopment, under the so‑called Pla Mirall (English "Mirror Plan"), attracted groups of immigrant workers from outside the European Union, especially from Africa and South America.

==== Archaeology ====
In September 2019, A 3,200-year-old well-preserved Bronze Age sword was discovered by archaeologists under the leadership of Jaume Deya and Pablo Galera on the Mallorca Island in the Puigpunyent from the stone megaliths site called Talaiot. Specialists assumed that the weapon was made when the Talaiotic culture was in critical decline. The sword will be on display at the nearby Mallorca Museum.

=== Palma ===
The capital of Mallorca, Palma, was founded as a Roman camp called Palmaria upon the remains of a Talaiotic settlement. The turbulent history of the city had it subject to several Vandal sackings during the fall of the Western Roman Empire. It was later reconquered by the Byzantines, established by the Moors (who called it Medina Mayurqa), and finally occupied by James I of Aragon. In 1983, Palma became the capital of the autonomous region of the Balearic Islands. Palma has a famous tourist attraction, the cathedral, Catedral-Basílica de Santa María de Mallorca, standing in the heart of the City looking out over the sea.

== Climate ==
Mallorca has a Mediterranean climate (Köppen: Csa), with mild and relatively wet winters and hot, bright, dry summers. Precipitation in the Serra de Tramuntana is markedly higher. Summers are hot in the plains, and winters are mild, getting colder and wetter in the Tramuntana range, where brief episodes of snow during the winter are not unusual, especially in the Puig Major. The two wettest months in Mallorca are October and November. Storms and heavy rain are not uncommon during the autumn.

Climate data for Palma de Mallorca, Port (1991–2020), extremes since 1978 (Satellite view)
Month	Jan	Feb	Mar	Apr	May	Jun	Jul	Aug	Sep	Oct	Nov	Dec	Year
Record high °C (°F)	24.2 (75.6)	24.4 (75.9)	26.6 (79.9)	28.0 (82.4)	32.0 (89.6)	36.5 (97.7)	38.0 (100.4)	37.8 (100.0)	35.5 (95.9)	31.2 (88.2)	27.6 (81.7)	23.4 (74.1)	38.0 (100.4)
Mean daily maximum °C (°F)	16.5 (61.7)	16.5 (61.7)	18.3 (64.9)	20.3 (68.5)	23.5 (74.3)	27.3 (81.1)	29.9 (85.8)	30.4 (86.7)	27.8 (82.0)	24.4 (75.9)	20.1 (68.2)	18.3 (64.9)	22.8 (73.0)
Daily mean °C (°F)	12.7 (54.9)	12.6 (54.7)	14.3 (57.7)	16.4 (61.5)	19.5 (67.1)	23.3 (73.9)	26.0 (78.8)	26.6 (79.9)	23.8 (74.8)	20.6 (69.1)	16.3 (61.3)	13.8 (56.8)	18.8 (65.9)
Mean daily minimum °C (°F)	8.9 (48.0)	8.7 (47.7)	10.2 (50.4)	12.4 (54.3)	15.5 (59.9)	19.3 (66.7)	22.1 (71.8)	22.7 (72.9)	20.0 (68.0)	16.8 (62.2)	12.6 (54.7)	10.1 (50.2)	14.9 (58.9)
Record low °C (°F)	0.0 (32.0)	−0.1 (31.8)	1.6 (34.9)	4.4 (39.9)	8.0 (46.4)	11.0 (51.8)	16.4 (61.5)	15.8 (60.4)	10.0 (50.0)	8.4 (47.1)	3.8 (38.8)	2.5 (36.5)	−0.1 (31.8)
Average precipitation mm (inches)	44.4 (1.75)	36.7 (1.44)	29.1 (1.15)	37.5 (1.48)	31.6 (1.24)	13.9 (0.55)	5.1 (0.20)	21.7 (0.85)	58.2 (2.29)	72.6 (2.86)	67.8 (2.67)	49.3 (1.94)	467.9 (18.42)
Average precipitation days (≥ 1 mm)	6.2	5.9	4.6	4.7	3.1	1.9	0.6	1.8	5.3	6.3	7.2	5.9	53.5
Mean monthly sunshine hours	170	176	218	250	300	329	356	323	238	211	165	157	2,893
Source 1: NOAA
Source 2: AEMET

Climate data for Palma de Mallorca Airport (1991–2020), extremes since 1954 (Satellite view)
Month	Jan	Feb	Mar	Apr	May	Jun	Jul	Aug	Sep	Oct	Nov	Dec	Year
Record high °C (°F)	22.5 (72.5)	24.0 (75.2)	28.6 (83.5)	30.1 (86.2)	35.0 (95.0)	41.4 (106.5)	40.6 (105.1)	40.2 (104.4)	38.2 (100.8)	33.6 (92.5)	27.2 (81.0)	23.8 (74.8)	41.4 (106.5)
Mean daily maximum °C (°F)	15.8 (60.4)	15.9 (60.6)	18.2 (64.8)	20.7 (69.3)	24.4 (75.9)	28.7 (83.7)	31.6 (88.9)	31.8 (89.2)	28.2 (82.8)	24.3 (75.7)	19.4 (66.9)	16.8 (62.2)	23.0 (73.4)
Daily mean °C (°F)	10.3 (50.5)	10.3 (50.5)	12.2 (54.0)	14.6 (58.3)	18.3 (64.9)	22.4 (72.3)	25.3 (77.5)	25.7 (78.3)	22.6 (72.7)	18.9 (66.0)	14.2 (57.6)	11.5 (52.7)	17.2 (62.9)
Mean daily minimum °C (°F)	4.7 (40.5)	4.7 (40.5)	6.2 (43.2)	8.6 (47.5)	12.1 (53.8)	16.1 (61.0)	19.0 (66.2)	19.7 (67.5)	17.0 (62.6)	13.6 (56.5)	9.0 (48.2)	6.2 (43.2)	11.4 (52.6)
Record low °C (°F)	−6.0 (21.2)	−10.0 (14.0)	−4.2 (24.4)	−2.0 (28.4)	1.6 (34.9)	6.0 (42.8)	11.0 (51.8)	10.8 (51.4)	5.6 (42.1)	0.0 (32.0)	−3.0 (26.6)	−3.1 (26.4)	−10.0 (14.0)
Average precipitation mm (inches)	40.0 (1.57)	32.4 (1.28)	23.1 (0.91)	32.3 (1.27)	28.5 (1.12)	13.3 (0.52)	3.7 (0.15)	16.2 (0.64)	56.9 (2.24)	67.0 (2.64)	61.7 (2.43)	46.9 (1.85)	422 (16.62)
Average precipitation days (≥ 1 mm)	6.0	5.3	4.1	4.4	3.3	2.0	0.5	1.7	5.1	6.0	6.7	5.8	50.9
Mean monthly sunshine hours	160	168	212	246	292	325	349	317	231	202	159	150	2,811
Source 1: NOAA
Source 2: AEMET

Palma de Mallorca sea temperature
Month	Jan	Feb	Mar	Apr	May	Jun	Jul	Aug	Sep	Oct	Nov	Dec	Year
Average sea temperature °C (°F)	14.4 (57.9)	13.9 (57.0)	14.1 (57.4)	15.9 (60.7)	18.9 (66.1)	22.5 (72.5)	24.9 (76.7)	26.0 (78.8)	25.0 (77.1)	22.7 (72.9)	19.7 (67.4)	16.3 (61.4)	19.5 (67.2)
Mean daily daylight hours	10.0	11.0	12.0	13.0	14.0	15.0	15.0	14.0	12.0	11.0	10.0	9.0	12.2
Average Ultraviolet index	2	3	5	6	8	9	9	8	6	4	2	2	5.3
Source: seatemperature.org
Source: Weather Atlas

== Geography ==
Satellite image

=== Geology ===
Mallorca and the other Balearic Islands are geologically an extension of the fold mountains of the Betic Cordillera of Andalusia. They consist primarily of sediments deposited in the Tethys Sea during the Mesozoic era. These marine deposits have given rise to calcareous rocks which are often fossiliferous. The folding of the Betic Cordillera and Mallorcan ranges resulted from subduction of the African Plate beneath the Eurasian Plate with eventual collision. Tectonic movements led to different elevation and lowering zones in the late Tertiary, which is why the connection to the mainland has been severed at the current sea level.

The limestones, which predominate throughout Mallorca, are readily water-soluble, and have given rise to extensive areas of karst. In addition to limestone, dolomitic rocks are mainly present in the mountainous regions of Mallorca; the Serra de Tramuntana and the Serres de Llevant. The Serres de Llevant also contain marl, the more rapid erosion of which has resulted in the lower elevations of the island's southeastern mountains. Marl is limestone with a high proportion of clay minerals. The eroded material was washed into the sea or deposited in the interior of the island of the Pla de Mallorca, bright marls in the north-east of the island and ferrous clays in the middle of Mallorca, which gives the soil its characteristic reddish colour.

=== Mountains of Mallorca ===
Mallorca features a landscape characterised by a series of mountain ranges. The highest peak, Puig Major, stands at approximately 1,445 meters (4,741 feet) above sea level. Other notable peaks include Puig de Massanella, Puig Tomir, Puig de l'Ofre, and Puig des Teix, all exceeding 1,000 meters (3,280 feet) in elevation. These mountains are part of the Serra de Tramuntana range with numerous peaks over 1,000 meters, offering opportunities for hiking and exploration with views of the Mediterranean. While not towering in comparison to some mountain ranges globally, the Mallorcan mountains provide visitors with diverse outdoor experiences and panoramic views of the island's rugged terrain and coastline.

==== Ten tallest mountains of Mallorca ====
Mountain Name	Meters	Feet
Puig Major	1,445	4,741
Puig de Massanella	1,364	4,475
Puig d'en Galileu	1,182	3,878
Puig de sa Rateta	1,110	3,642
Puig Tomir	1,103	3,619
Puig de l'Ofre	1,091	3,579
Puig de sa Font	1,071	3,514
Puig des Teix	1,064	3,491
Puig de Galatzó	1,027	3,369
Serra de Tramuntana (Various Peaks)	Over 1,000	Over 3,280

=== Regions ===
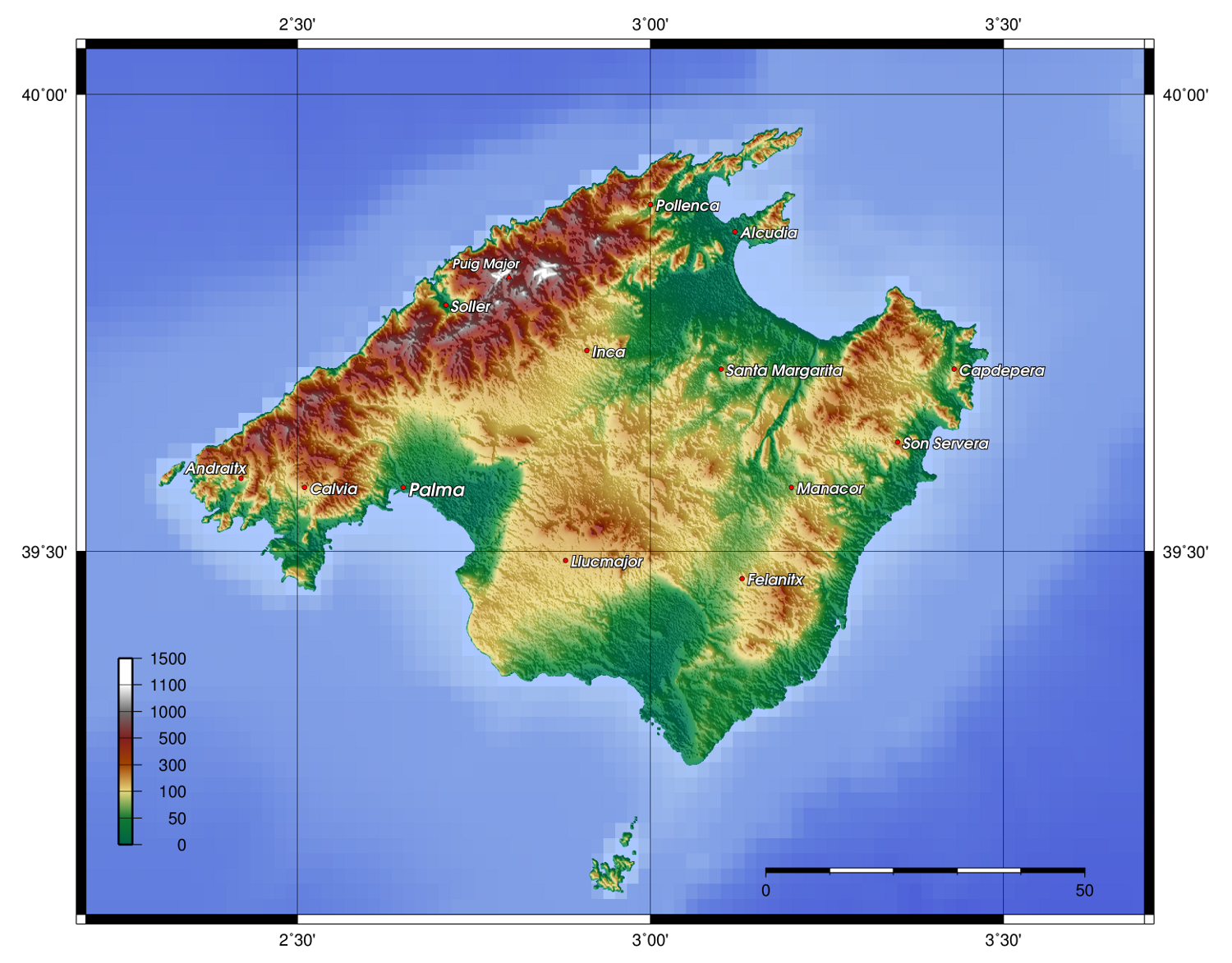
Topography

Mallorca is the largest island of Spain by area and second most populated (after Tenerife in the Canary Islands). Mallorca has two mountainous regions, the Serra de Tramuntana and Serres de Llevant. Both are about 70 km (43 mi) in length and occupy the northwestern and eastern parts of the island respectively.

The highest peak in Mallorca is Puig Major, at 1,445 m (4,741 ft), in the Serra de Tramuntana. As this is a military zone, the neighbouring peak at Puig de Massanella is the highest accessible peak at 1,364 m (4,475 ft). The northeast coast comprises two bays: the Badia de Pollença and the larger Badia d'Alcúdia.

The northern coast is rugged and has many cliffs. The central zone, extending from Palma, is a generally flat, fertile plain known as Es Pla. The island has a variety of caves both above and below the sea – two of the caves, the above sea level Coves dels Hams and the Coves del Drach, also contain underground lakes and are open to tours. Both are located near the eastern coastal town of Porto Cristo. Small uninhabited islands lie off the southern and western coasts; the Cabrera Archipelago is administratively grouped with Mallorca (in the municipality of Palma), while Dragonara is administratively included in the municipality of Andratx. Other notable areas include the Alfabia Mountains, Es Cornadors and Cap de Formentor. The Cap de Formentor is one of the places where the tourists can enjoy the pleasure of its beach which is golden and very thin.

=== World Heritage Site ===
The Cultural Landscape of the Serra de Tramuntana was registered as a UNESCO World Heritage Site in 2011.

=== Municipalities ===
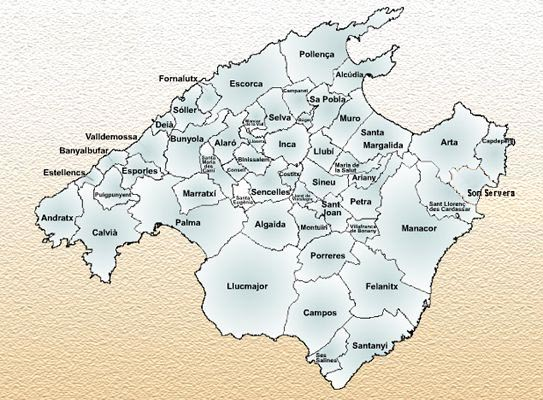
Municipalities of Mallorca

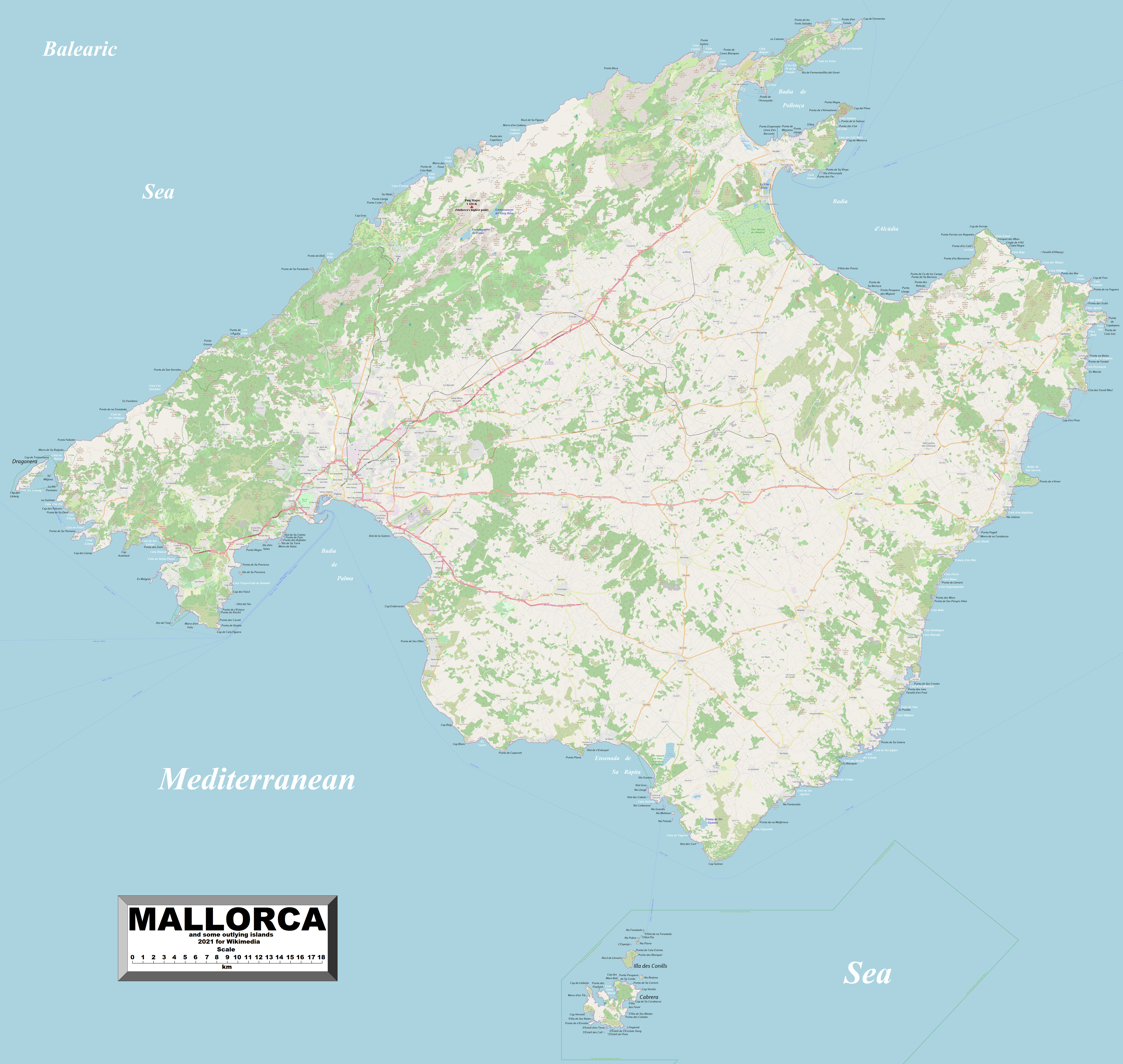
Enlargeable, detailed map of Mallorca and outlying islands

The island (including the small offshore islands of Cabrera and Dragonera) is administratively divided into 53 municipalities. The areas and populations of the municipalities (according to the Instituto Nacional de Estadística, Spain) are:

Municipality	Area (km^{2})	Census Population 1 November 2001	Census Population 1 November 2011	Census Population 1 January 2021	Estimated Population 1 January 2023
Alaró	45.7	4,050	5,273	5,800	5,948
Alcúdia	60.0	12,500	18,914	20,694	21,725
Algaida	89.8	3,749	5,272	6,013	6,230
Andratx	81.5	7,753	11,234	11,780	12,096
Ariany	23.1	766	892	906	976
Artà	139.8	6,176	7,562	8,180	8,324
Banyalbufar	18.1	517	559	541	578
Binissalem	29.8	5,166	7,640	8,931	9,225
Búger	8.29	950	1,014	1,089	1,152
Bunyola	84.7	5,029	6,270	7,115	7,343
Calvià	145.0	35,977	49,807	51,831	53,496
Campanet	34.6	2,309	2,536	2,654	2,785
Campos	149.7	6,360	9,712	11,471	11,817
Capdepera	54.9	8,239	11,281	12,212	12,585
Consell	13.7	2,407	3,778	4,240	4,291
Costitx	15.4	924	1,113	1,398	1,520
Deià	15.2	654	684	686	688
Escorca	139.4	257	258	183	195
Esporles	35.3	4,066	4,845	5,153	5,283
Estellencs	13.4	347	363	326	361
Felanitx	169.8	14,882	18,045	18,211	18,636
Fornalutx	19.5	618	695	681	715
Inca	58.3	23,029	30,359	33,719	34,459
Lloret de Vistalegre	17.4	981	1,308	1,469	1,591
Lloseta	12.1	4,760	5,690	6,318	6,453
Llubí	34.9	1,806	2,235	2,405	2,462
Llucmajor	327.3	24,277	35,995	38,475	39,156
Manacor	260.3	31,255	40,348	44,878	46,614
Mancor de la Vall	19.9	892	1,321	1,570	1,643
Maria de la Salut	30.5	1,972	2,122	2,235	2,333
Marratxí	54.2	23,410	34,538	38,351	39,455
Montuïri	41.1	2,344	2,856	3,061	3,142
Muro	58.6	6,107	7,010	7,547	7,842
Palma	208.7	333,801	402,044	424,837	430,640
Petra	70.0	1,911	2,876	3,051	3,151
Pollença	151.7	13,808	16,057	16,903	17,260
Porreres	86.9	4,069	5,459	5,630	5,749
Puigpunyent	42.3	1,250	1,878	2,073	2,090
Santa Eugènia	20.3	1,224	1,686	1,774	1,870
Santa Margalida	86.5	7,800	11,725	12,830	13,231
Santa Maria del Camí	37.6	4,959	6,443	7,526	7,579
Santanyí	124.9	8,875	12,427	12,364	12,561
Sant Joan	38.5	1,634	2,029	2,173	2,204
Sant Llorenç des Cardassar	82.1	6,503	8,490	9,058	9,378
Sa Pobla	48.6	10,388	12,999	14,064	14,296
Selva	48.8	2,927	3,699	4,113	4,289
Sencelles	52.9	2,146	3,113	3,616	3,876
Ses Salines	39.1	3,389	5,007	5,021	5,032
Sineu	47.7	2,736	3,696	4,156	4,387
Sóller	42.8	10,961	13,882	13,621	13,747
Son Servera	42.6	9,432	11,915	12,072	12,129
Valldemossa	42.9	1,708	1,990	2,047	2,053
Vilafranca de Bonany	24.0	2,466	2,984	3,553	3,691

=== Comarques ===
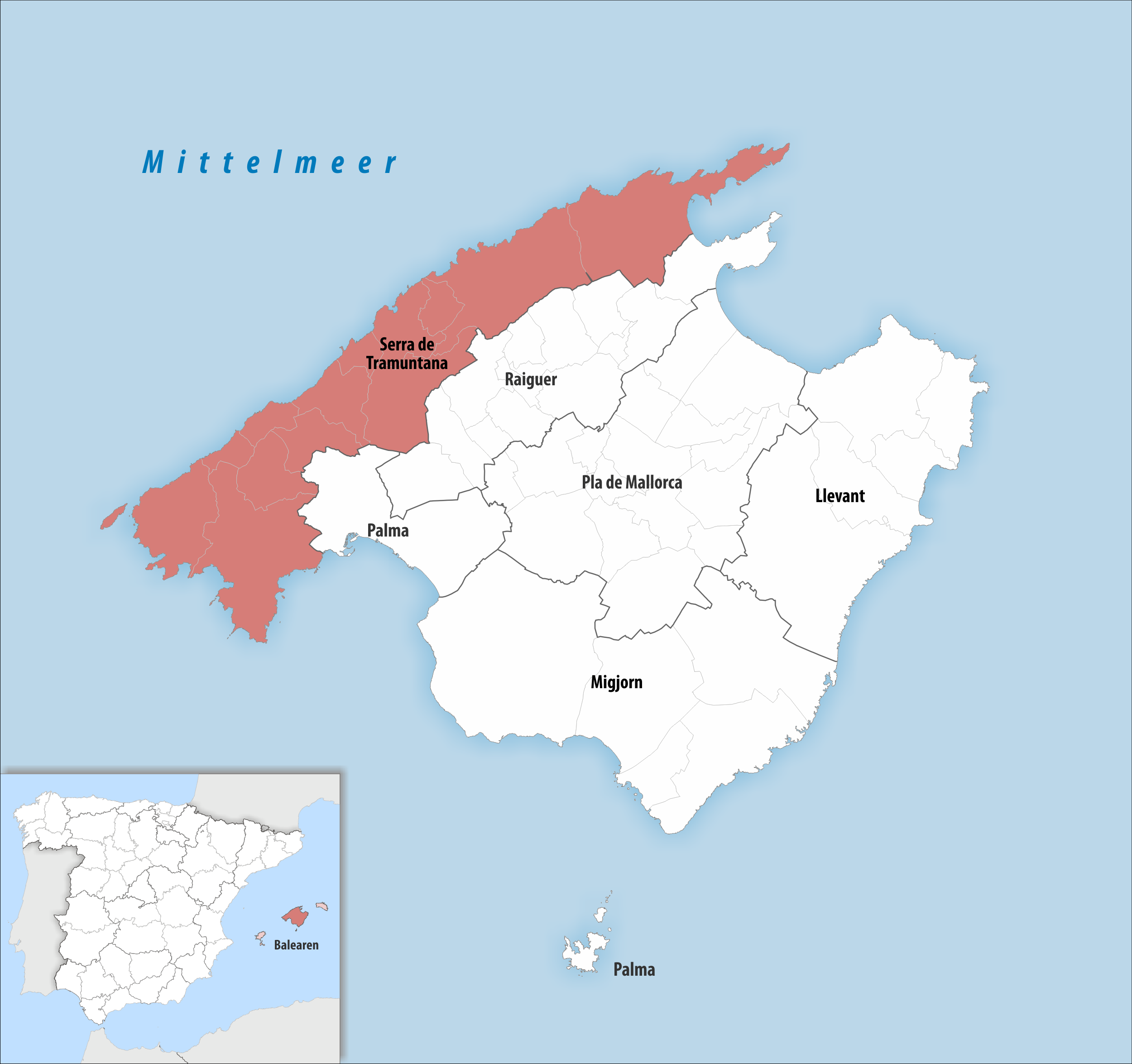
Serra de Tramuntana

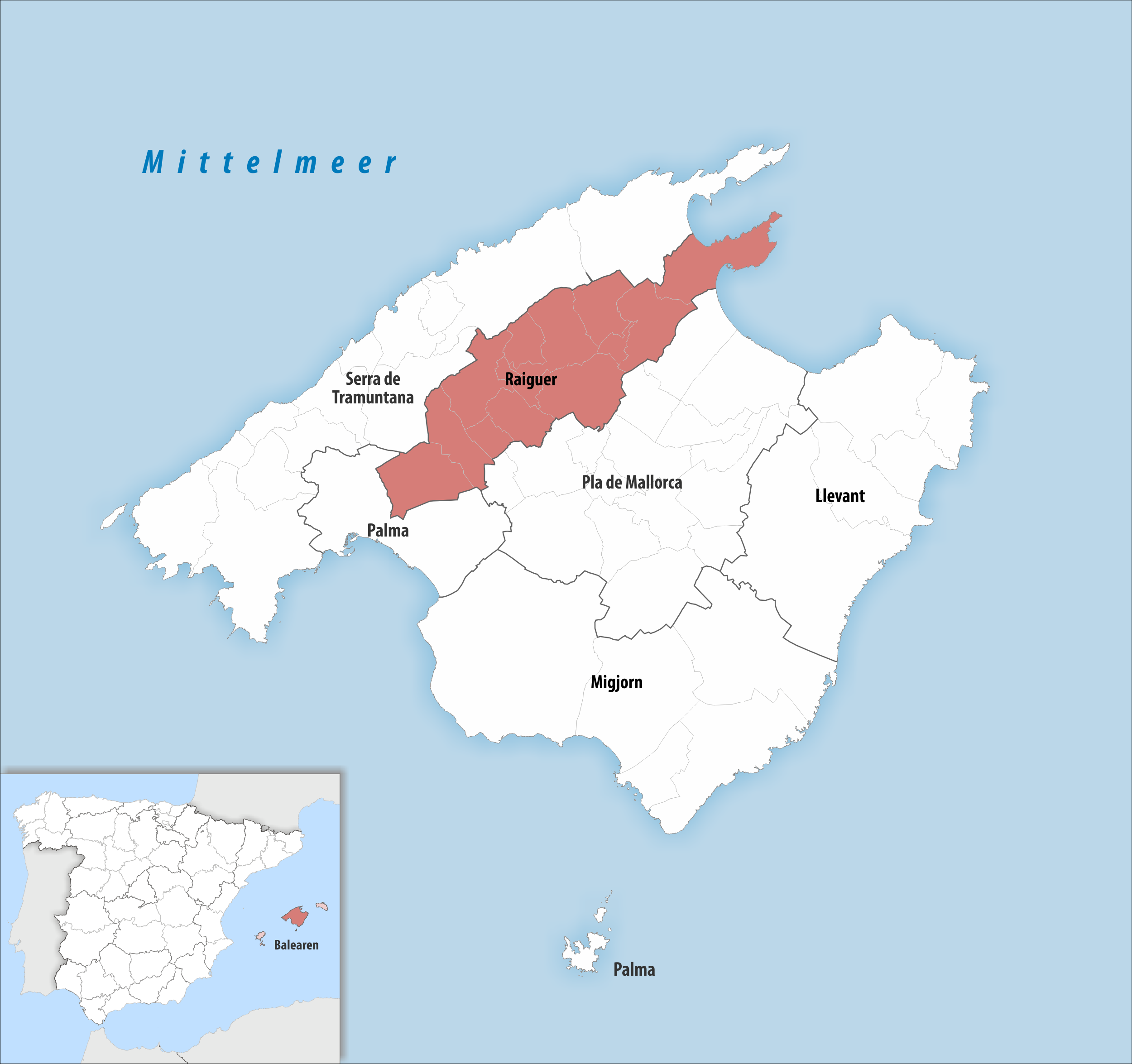
Raiguer

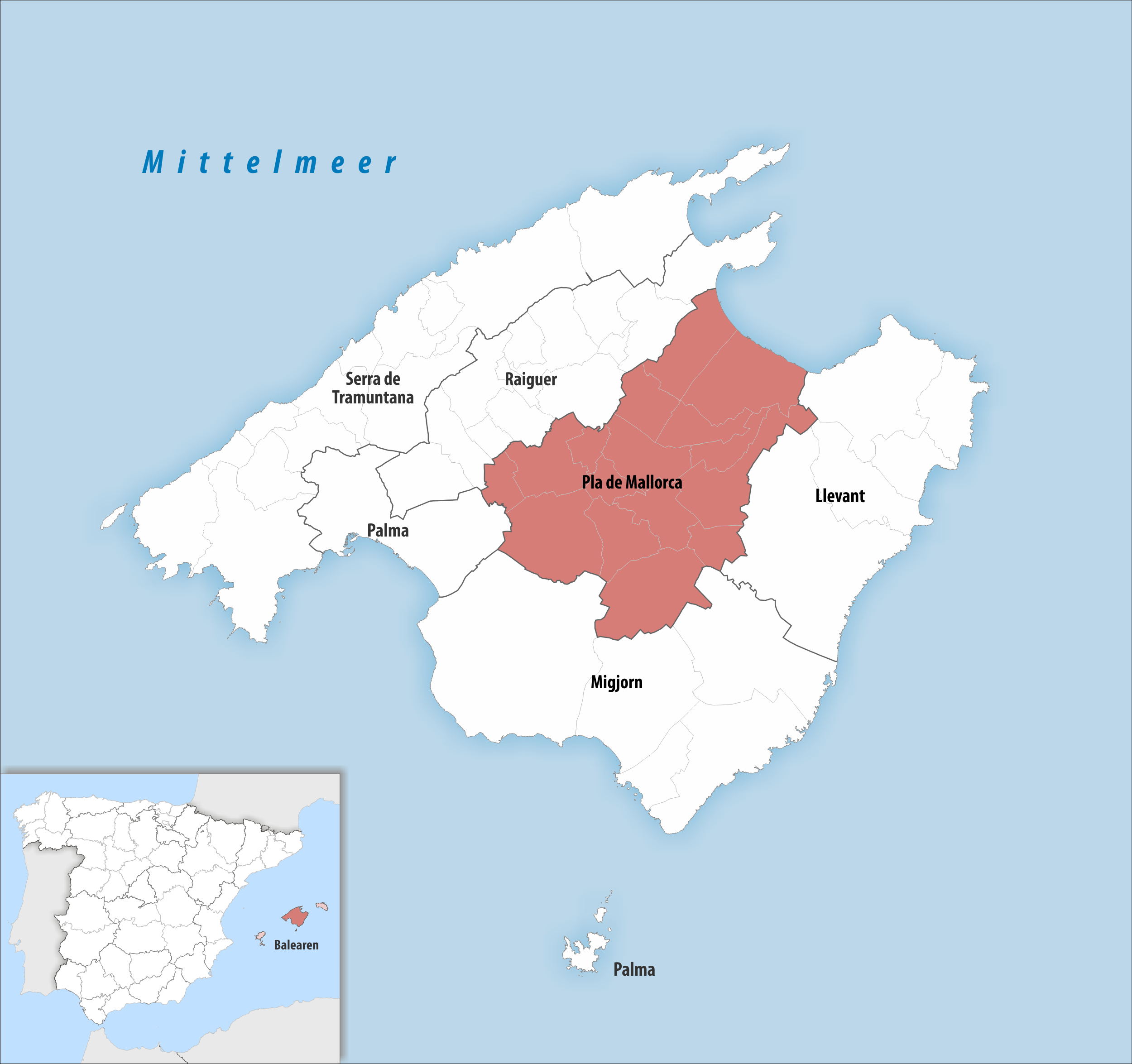
Pla de Mallorca

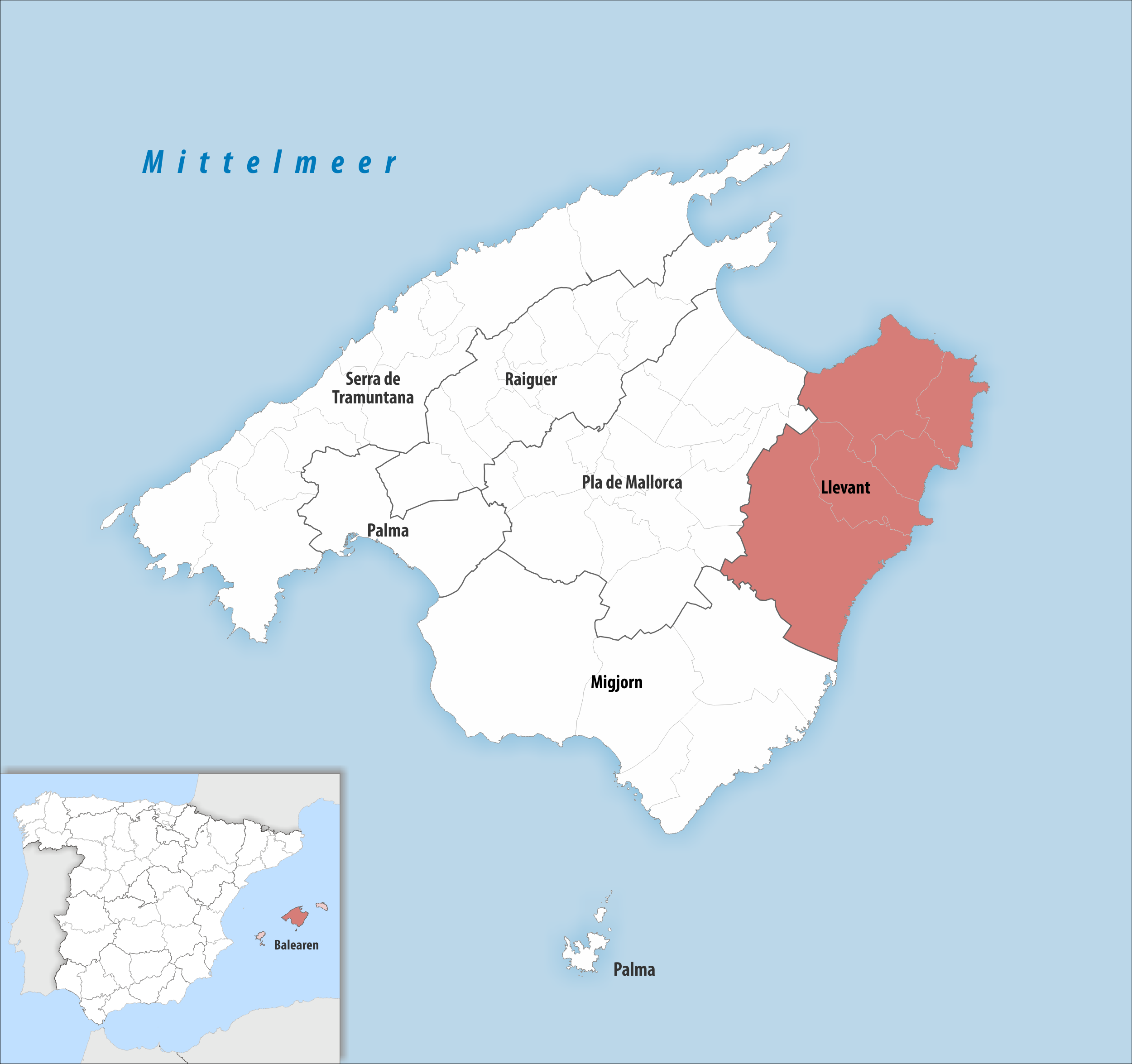
Llevant

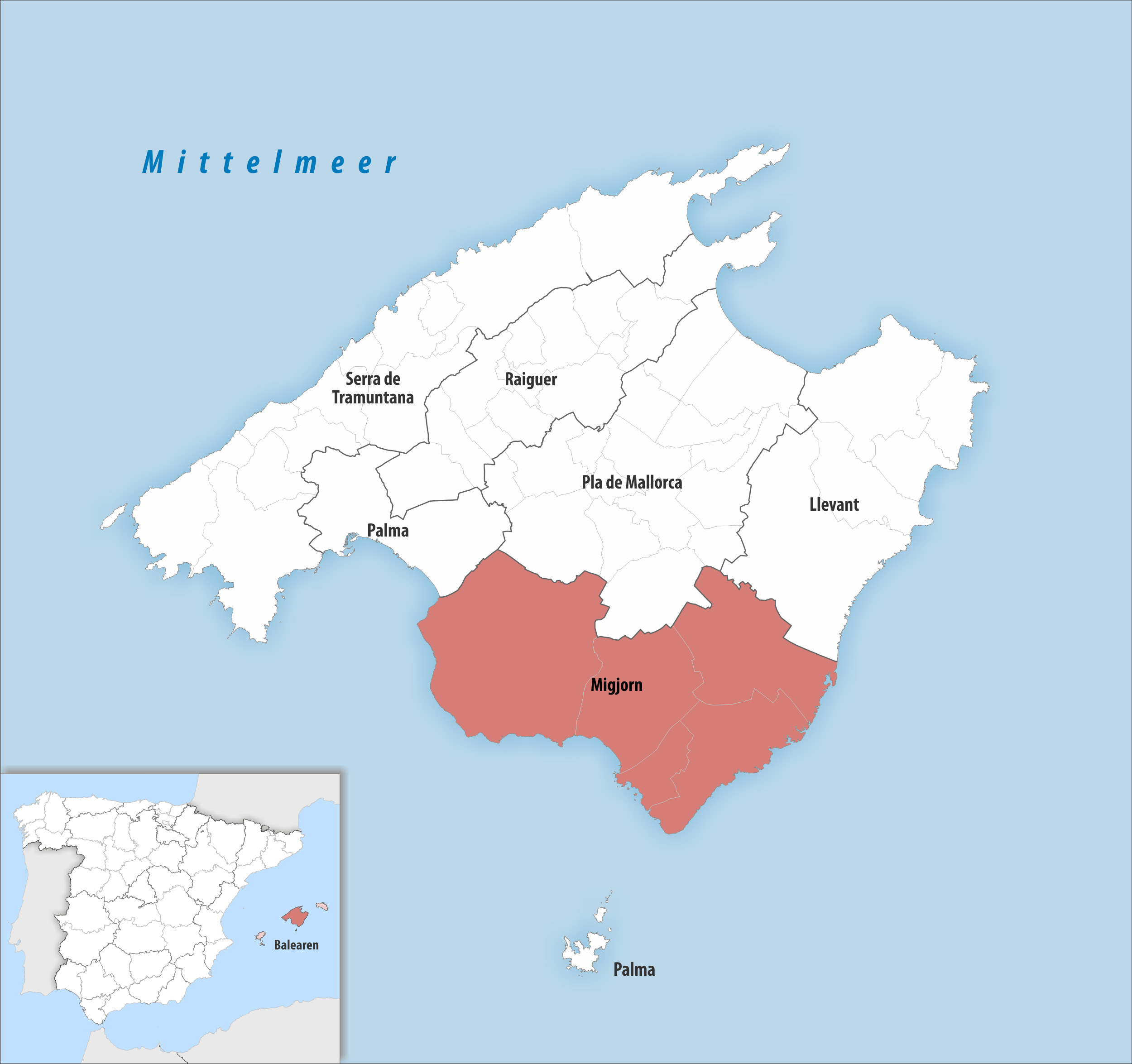
Migjorn

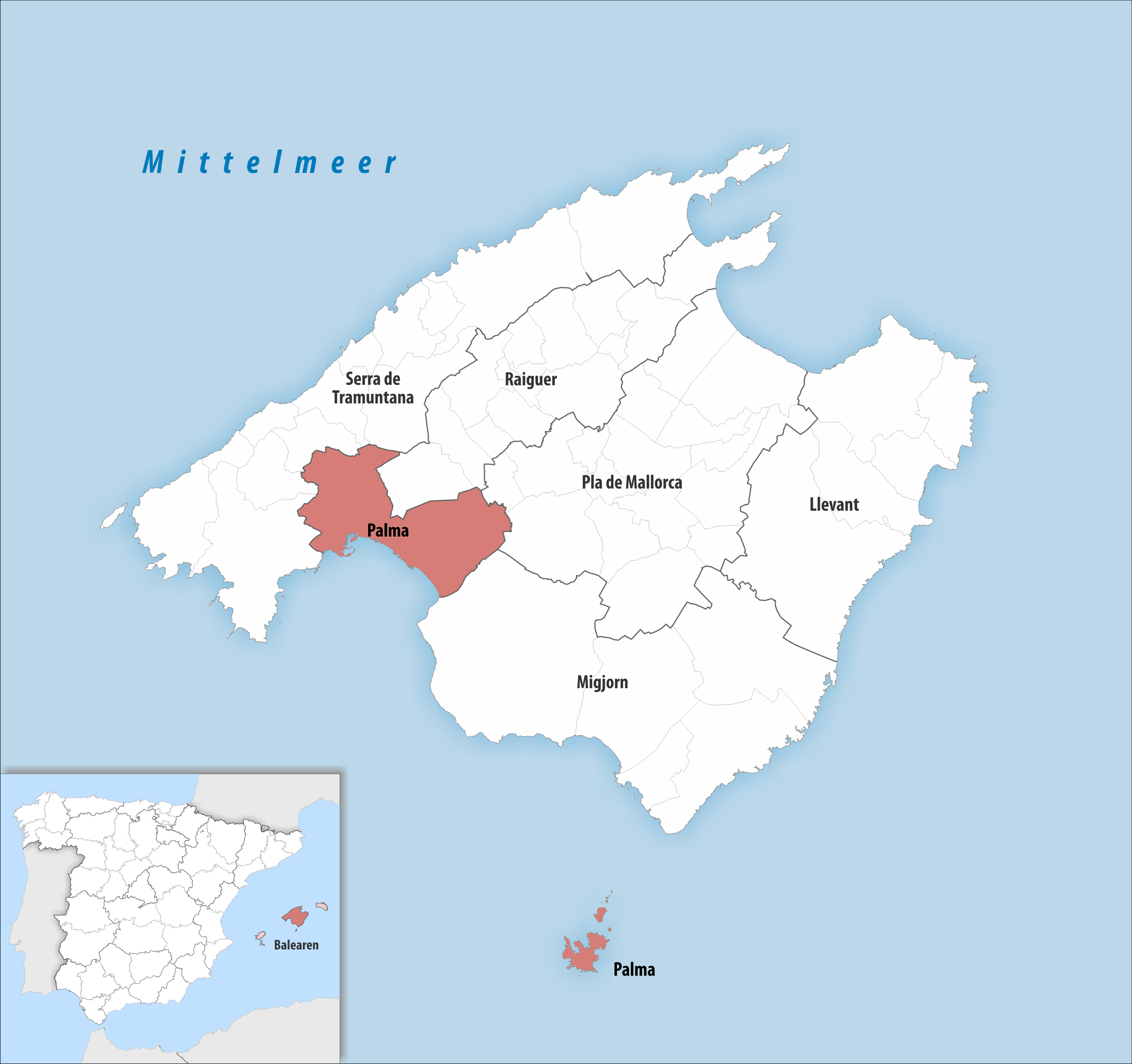
Palma

== Population ==
Mallorca is the most populous island in the Balearic Islands and the second most populous island in Spain, after Tenerife, in the Canary Islands, being also the fourth most populous island in the Mediterranean after Sicily, Sardinia and Cyprus. It had a Census population of 920,605 inhabitants at the start of 2021, and an official estimate of 940,332 at the start of 2023.

== Economy ==
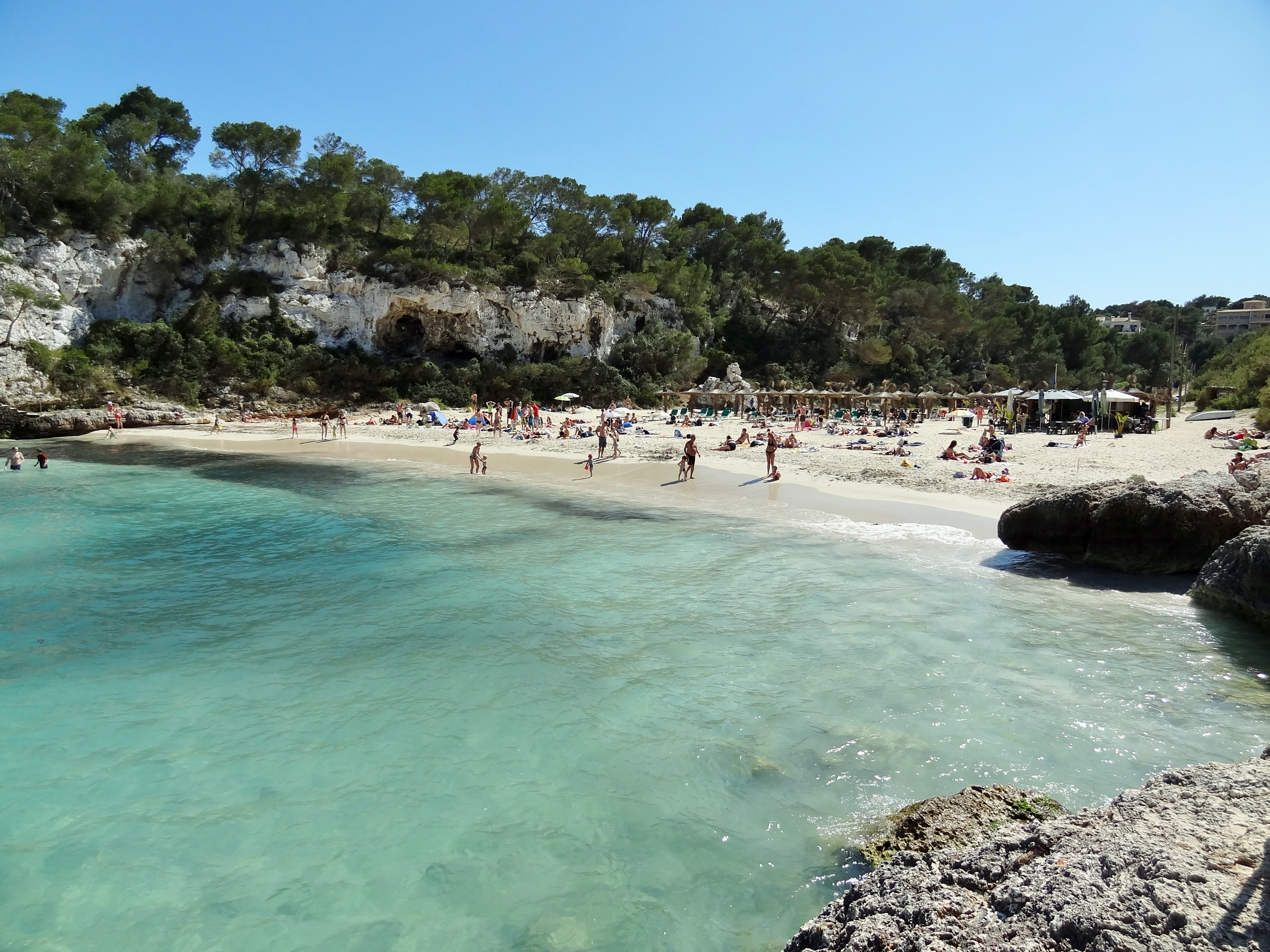
The beaches in the southeast of Mallorca are popular tourist attractions.

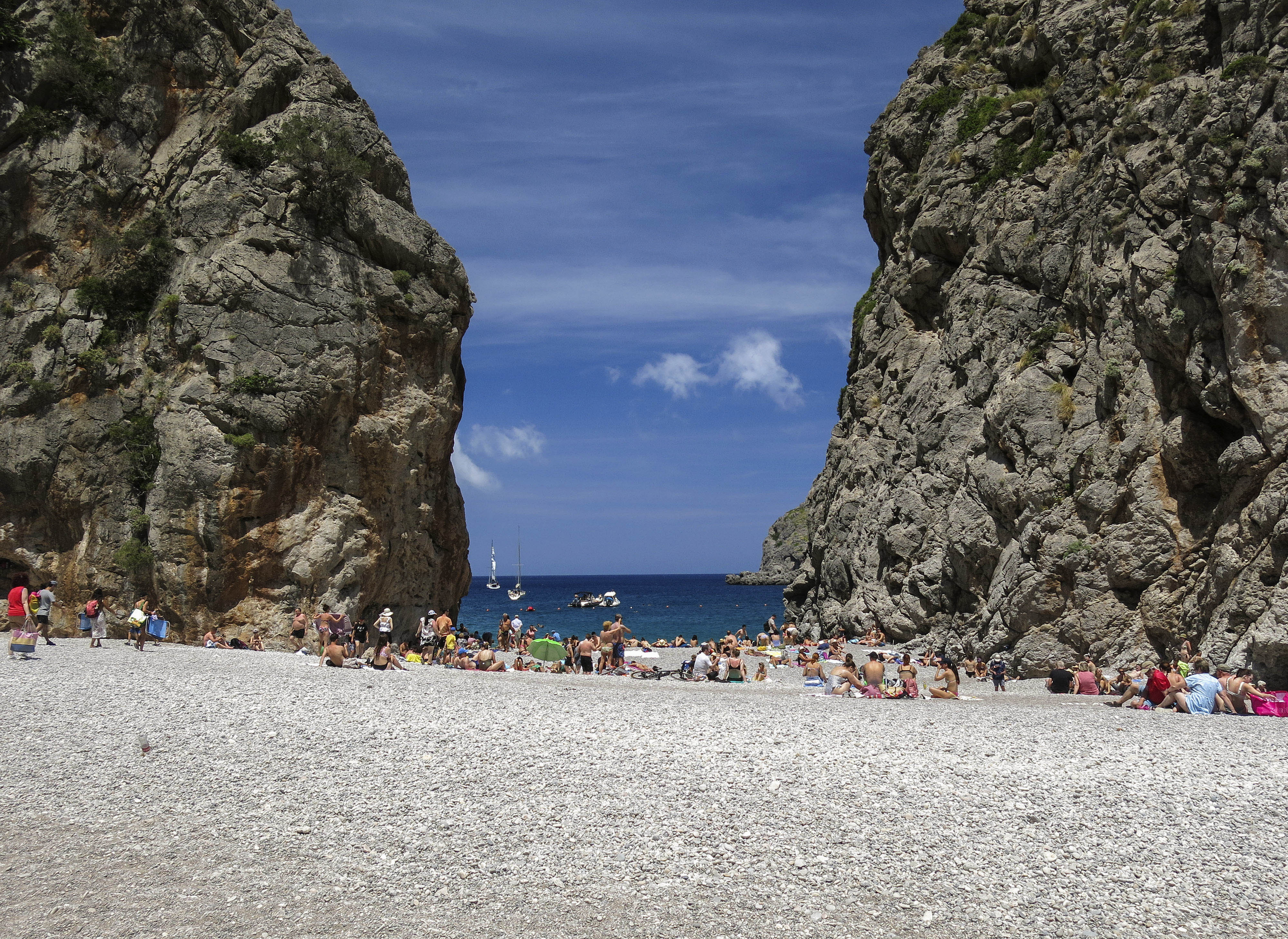
The main base of the economy of Mallorca is tourism. Escorca (Serra de Tramuntana).

Since the 1950s, Mallorca has become a major tourist destination, and the tourism business has become the main source of revenue for the island.

The island's popularity as a tourist destination has steadily grown since the 1950s, with many artists and academics choosing to visit and live on the island. The number of visitors to Mallorca continued to increase with holiday makers in the 1970s approaching 3 million a year. In 2010 over 6 million visitors came to Mallorca. In 2013, Mallorca was visited by nearly 9.5 million tourists, and the Balearic Islands as a whole reached 13 million tourists. In 2017, ten million tourists visited the island. The rapid growth of the tourism industry has led to some locals protesting the effects of mass tourism on the island.

Mallorca has been jokingly referred to as the 17th Federal State of Germany, due to the high number of German tourists, although people from the island reject this label and deem it "an insult".

Mallorca has recently also become a business hub economy of its own, due to the high number of foreign enterprises having either relocated to the island, or expanded their presence there. A significant number of expats settling in Mallorca has also contributed to the island's business economy.

Attempts to build illegally caused a scandal in 2006 in Port Andratx that the newspaper El País named "caso Andratx". A main reason for illegal building permits, corruption and black market construction is that communities have few ways to finance themselves other than through permits. The former mayor was incarcerated in 2009 after being prosecuted for taking bribes to permit illegal house building.

=== Top 10 arrivals by nationality ===
Data from Institute of Statistics of Balearic Islands

Rank	Country, region, or territory	2015	2014	2013	2012	2011	2010
1	Germany	3,237,745	3,731,458	3,710,313	3,450,687	3,308,604	2,224,709
2	United Kingdom	1,985,311	2,165,774	2,105,981	1,986,354	1,898,838	1,324,294
3	Spain	1,059,612	1,088,973	985,557	1,192,033	1,195,822	759,825
4	Nordic countries	641,920	758,940	758,637	668,328	572,041	387,875
5	Benelux	345,837	366,130	363,911	360,973	368,930	284,845
6	Switzerland	325,241	334,871	312,491	292,226	280,401	188,826
7	France	323,241	328,681	337,891	349,712	316,124	187,589
8	Italy	203,520	165,473	154,227	173,680	200,851	135,535
9	Austria	163,477	175,530	160,890	138,287	181,993	107,991
10	Ireland	104,556	100,059	104,827	115,164	158,646	68,456

== Politics and government ==
Emblem of the Mallorca Insular Council

=== Regional government ===
The Balearic Islands, of which Mallorca forms part, are one of the autonomous communities of Spain. As a whole, they are currently governed by the People's Party of the Balearic Islands (PP), with Marga Prohens as their President.

=== Insular government ===
The specific government institution for the island is the Insular Council of Mallorca commonly known as Council of Mallorca, created in 1978.

It is responsible for culture, roads, railways (see Serveis Ferroviaris de Mallorca) and municipal administration. As of September 2023, Llorenç Galmés (PP) serves as president of the Insular Council.

==== Results of the elections to the Council of Mallorca ====
Elections are held every four years concurrently with local elections. From 1983 to 2007, councilors were indirectly elected from the results of the election to Parliament of the Balearic Islands for the constituency of Mallorca. Since 2007, however, separate direct elections are held to elect the Council.

Island Councilors of the Council of Mallorca since 1978
Key to parties PCE EUIB EU–EV Podemos United We Can–EUIB PSM Bloc MÉS PSIB–PSOE El Pí El Pí CDS UM UIM–IM Cs UCD PP CP AP–PL Vox
Election	Distribution	President
1979	1 / 2 / 6 / 15	Jeroni Albertí (UCD) (1979-1982)
1979	1 / 2 / 6 / 15	Maximilià Morales (UCD) (1982-1983)
1983	2 / 11 / 6 / 11	Jeroni Albertí (UM)
1987	2 / 11 / 3 / 4 / 13	Joan Verger (PP)
1991	3 / 11 / 1 / 18	Joan Verger (PP)
1995	2 / 5 / 8 / 2 / 16	Maria Antònia Munar (UM)
1999	2 / 4 / 8 / 3 / 16	Maria Antònia Munar (UM)
2003	2 / 3 / 9 / 3 / 16	Maria Antònia Munar (UM)
2007	3 / 11 / 3 / 16	Francina Armengol (PSIB–PSOE)
2011	4 / 10 / 19	Maria Salom (PP)
2015	5 / 6 / 7 / 3 / 2 / 10	Miquel Ensenyat (MÉS)
2019	3 / 4 / 10 / 3 / 3 / 7 / 3	Catalina Cladera (PSIB–PSOE)
2023	4 / 9 / 2 / 13 / 5	Llorenç Galmés (PP)

== Culture ==
=== Archduke Ludwig Salvator of Austria ===
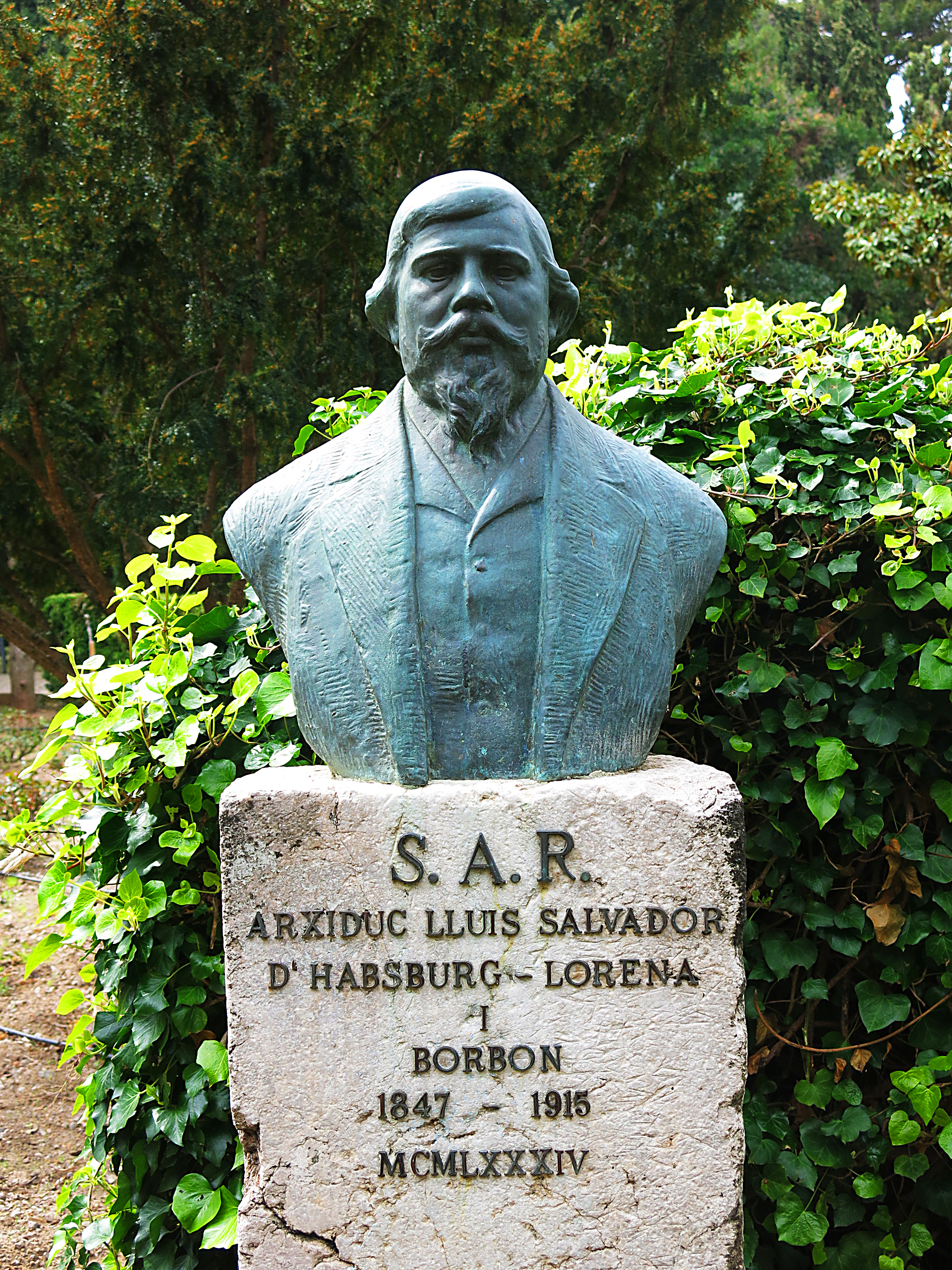
A sculpture of Ludwig Salvator in Mallorca

Archduke Ludwig Salvator of Austria (Catalan: Arxiduc Lluís Salvador) was a pioneer of tourism in the Balearic Islands. He first arrived on the island in 1867, travelling under his title "Count of Neuendorf". He later settled in Mallorca, buying up wild areas of land in order to preserve and enjoy them. Nowadays, a number of hiking routes are named after him.

Ludwig Salvator loved the island of Mallorca. He became fluent in Catalan, carried out research into the island's flora and fauna, history, and culture to produce his main work, Die Balearen, a comprehensive collection of books about the Balearic Islands, consisting of 7 volumes. It took him 22 years to complete.

Nowadays, several streets or buildings on the island are named after him (i.e., Arxiduc Lluís Salvador).

=== Chopin in Mallorca ===
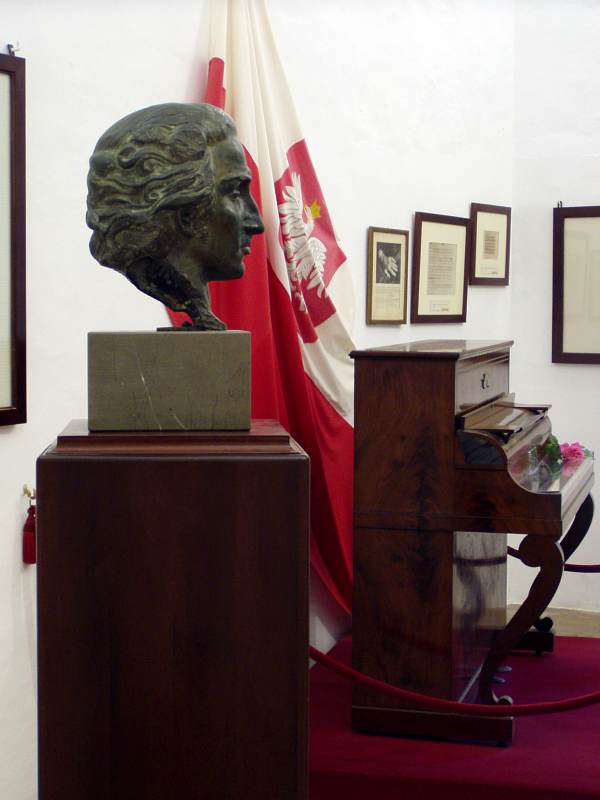
Chopin's piano in Valldemossa, Mallorca

The Polish composer and pianist Frédéric Chopin, together with French writer Amantine Lucile Aurore Dupin (pseudonym: George Sand), resided in Valldemossa in the winter of 1838–39. Apparently, Chopin's health had already deteriorated and his doctor recommended that he go to the Balearic Islands to recuperate, where he still spent a rather miserable winter.

Nonetheless, his time in Mallorca was a productive period for Chopin. He managed to finish the Preludes, Op. 28, that he started writing in 1835. He was also able to undertake work on his Ballade No. 2, Op. 38; two Polonaises, Op. 40; and the Scherzo No. 3, Op. 39.

=== Literature ===
French writer Amantine Lucile Aurore Dupin (pseudonym: George Sand), at that time in a relationship with Chopin, described her stay in Mallorca in A Winter in Majorca, published in 1855. Other famous writers used Mallorca as the setting for their works. While on the island, the Nicaraguan poet Rubén Darío started writing the novel El oro de Mallorca, and wrote several poems, such as La isla de oro.

The poet Miquel Costa i Llobera wrote in 1875 his famous ode, the Pine of Formentor, as well as other poems concerning old Mallorcan traditions and fantasies. Many of the works of Baltasar Porcel take place in Mallorca.

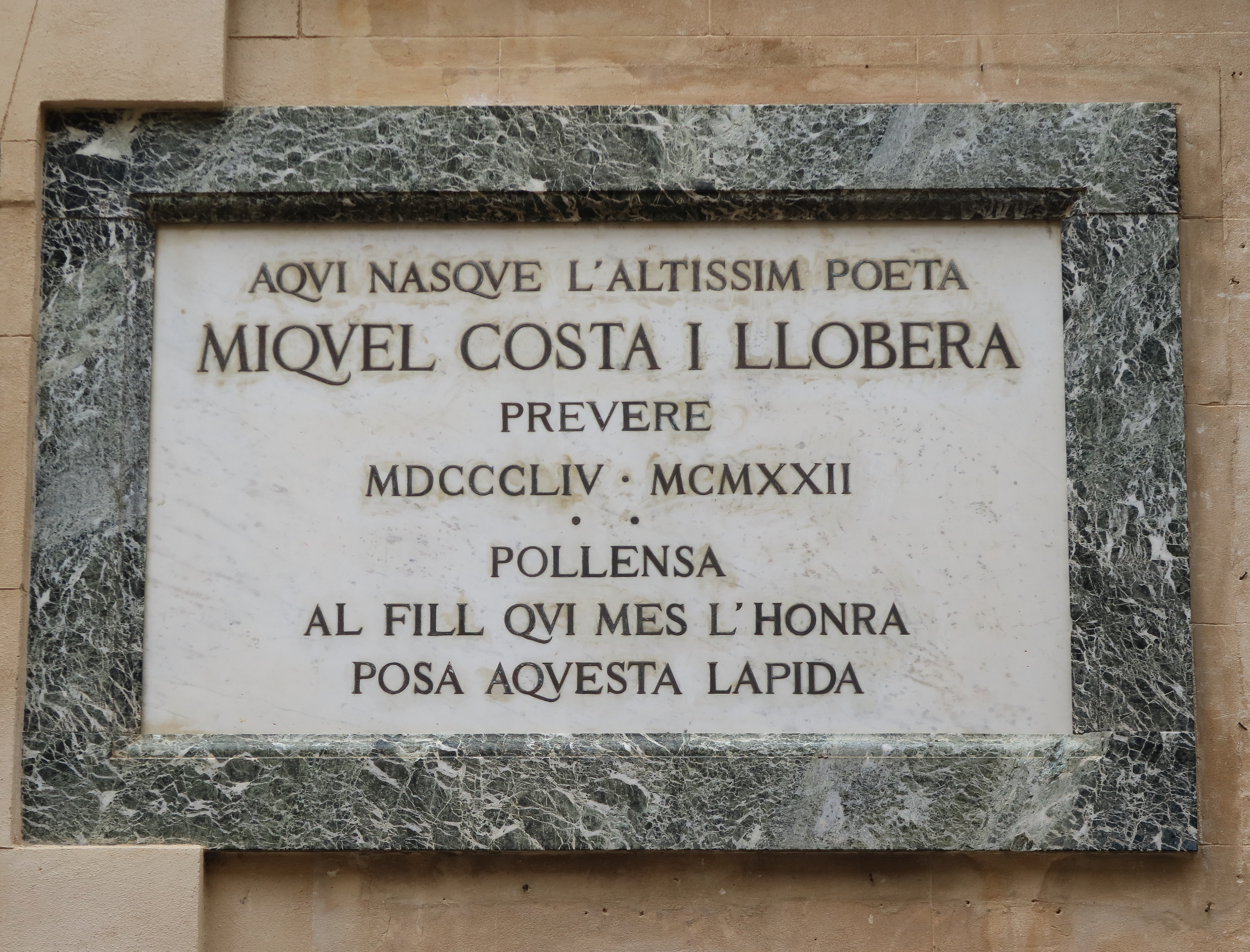
House of poet Miquel Costa i Llobera

Agatha Christie visited the island in the early 20th century and stayed in Palma and Port de Pollença. She would later write the book Problem at Pollensa Bay and Other Stories, a collection of short stories, of which the first one takes place in Port de Pollença, starring Parker Pyne.

Jorge Luis Borges visited Mallorca twice, accompanied by his family. He published his poems La estrella (1920) and Catedral (1921) in the regional magazine Baleares. The latter poem shows his admiration for the monumental Cathedral of Palma.

Nobel Prize winner Camilo José Cela came to Mallorca in 1954, visiting Pollença, and then moving to Palma, where he settled permanently. In 1956, Cela founded the magazine Papeles de Son Armadans. He is also credited as founder of Alfaguara.

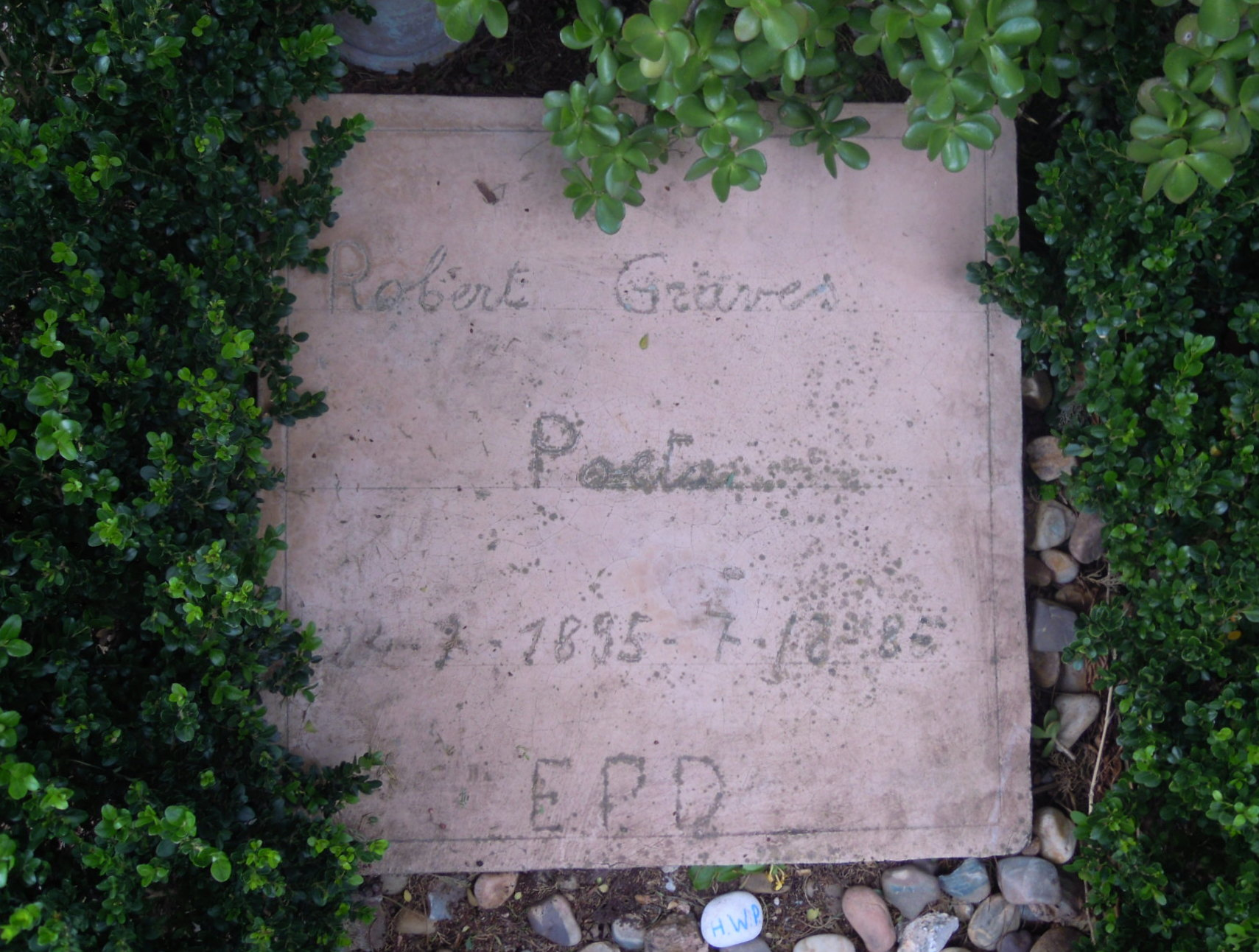
Graves' grave

The English writer and poet Robert Graves moved to Mallorca with his family in 1946. The house is now a museum. He died in 1985 and was buried in the small churchyard on a hill at Deià.

Ira Levin set part of his dystopian novel This Perfect Day in Mallorca, making the island a centre of resistance in a world otherwise dominated by a computer.

=== Music and dance ===
The Ball dels Cossiers is the island's traditional dance. It is believed to have been imported from Catalonia in the 13th or 14th century, after the Aragonese conquest of the island under King James I. In the dance, three pairs of dancers, who are typically male, defend a "Lady," who is played by a man or a woman, from a demon or devil. Another Mallorcan dance is Correfoc, an elaborate festival of dance and pyrotechnics that is also of Catalan origin. The island's folk music strongly resembles that of Catalonia, and is centered around traditional instruments like the xeremies (bagpipe) and guitarra de canya (a reed or bone xylophone-like instrument suspended from the neck). While folk music is still played and enjoyed by many on the island, a number of other musical traditions have become popular in Mallorca in the 21st century, including electronic dance music, classical music, and jazz, all of which have annual festivals on the island.

=== Art ===
Joan Miró, a Spanish painter, sculptor, and ceramicist, had close ties to the island throughout his life. He married Pilar Juncosa in Palma in 1929 and settled permanently in Mallorca in 1954. The Fundació Pilar i Joan Miró in Mallorca has a collection of his works. Es Baluard in Palma is a museum of modern and contemporary art which exhibits the work of Balearic artists and artists related to the Balearic Islands.

=== Film ===
The Evolution Mallorca International Film Festival is the fastest growing Mediterranean film festival and has taken place annually every November since 2011, attracting filmmakers, producers, and directors globally. It is hosted at the Teatro Principal in Palma de Mallorca.

=== Mallorcan cartographic school ===
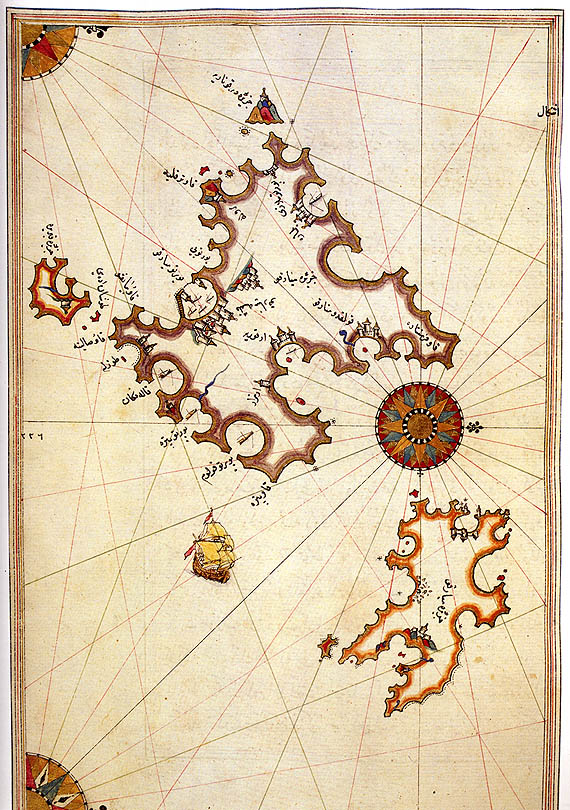
Map of Mallorca and Menorca by the Ottoman admiral Piri Reis

Mallorca has a long history of seafaring. The Majorcan cartographic school or the "Catalan school" refers to a collection of cartographers, cosmographers, and navigational instrument makers who flourished in Mallorca and partly in mainland Catalonia in the 13th, 14th, and 15th centuries. Mallorcan cosmographers and cartographers developed breakthroughs in cartographic techniques, namely the "normal portolan chart", which was fine-tuned for navigational use and the plotting by compass of navigational routes, prerequisites for the discovery of the New World.

=== Cuisine ===
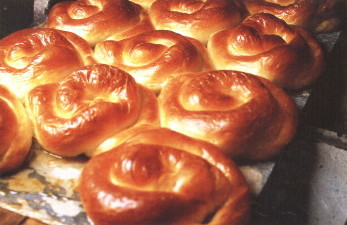
Ensaïmades, a type of Mallorcan pastry

In 2005, there were over 2,400 restaurants on the island of Mallorca according to the Mallorcan Tourist Board, ranging from small bars to full restaurants. Olives and almonds are typical of the Mallorcan diet. Among the foods that are typical from Mallorca are sobrassada, arròs brut (saffron rice cooked with chicken, pork and vegetables), and the sweet pastry ensaïmada. Also Pa amb oli is a popular dish. Majorcan soup a common rustic food which is often closer in texture to a casserole or very thick stew, and is typically is eaten with a fork rather than a spoon.

Herbs de Majorca is a herbal liqueur.

== Language ==
The two official languages of Mallorca are Catalan and Spanish, a dialect of the former being the indigenous language of Mallorca. The local dialect of Catalan spoken in the island is Mallorquí, with slightly different variants in most villages. Education is bilingual in Catalan and Spanish, with some teaching of English.

In 2012, the then-governing People's Party announced its intention to end preferential treatment for Catalan in the island's schools to bring parity to the two languages of the island. It was said that this could lead Mallorcan Catalan to become extinct in the fairly near future, as it was being used in a situation of diglossia in favour of the Spanish language. However, following a May 2015 election that swept a pro-Catalan party into power, this policy was dropped.

== Transportation ==
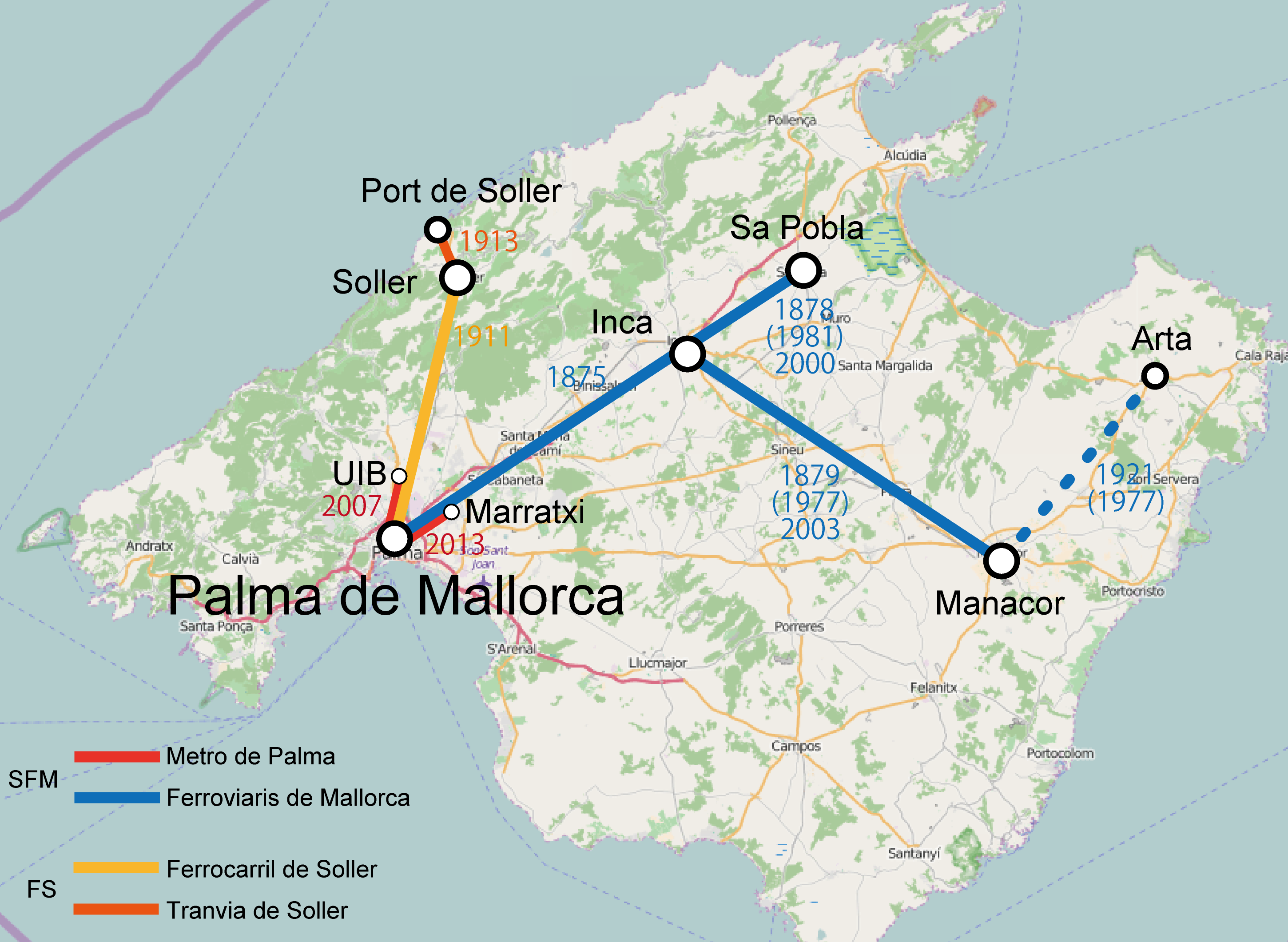
Mallorca current railways

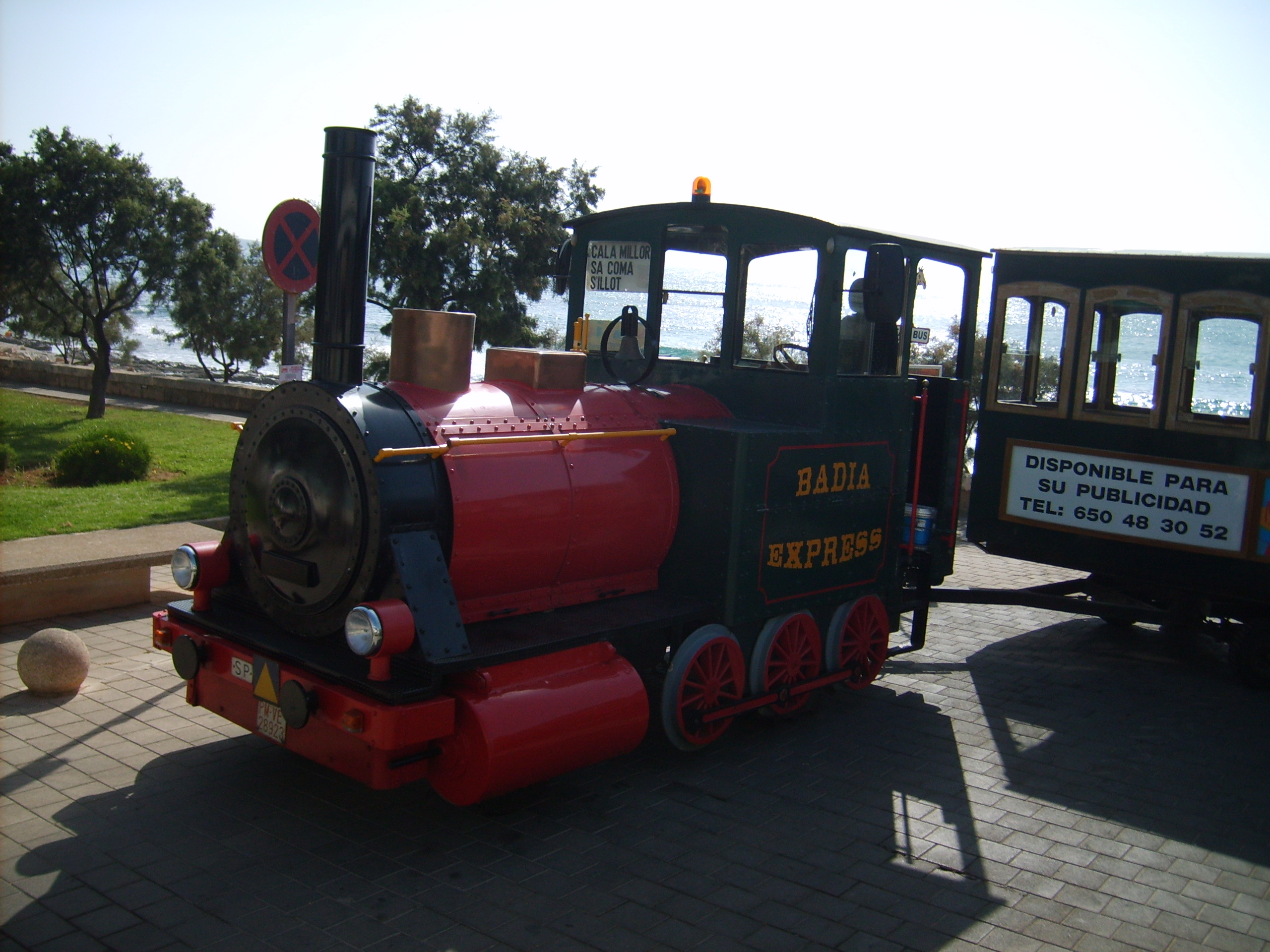
Badia Express Cala Millor

- Mallorca rail network
  - Palma de Mallorca Metro
  - Ferrocarril de Sóller
- Mallorca bus system (TIB)

A trackless train is in operation in several tourist areas.

=== Air transport ===
Air travel to and from the island is served by Palma de Mallorca Airport. In 2024, the airport handled 33.3 million passengers, making it the third busiest airport in Spain, after Madrid–Barajas and Barcelona–El Prat; and the fourteenth in Europe.

=== Water transport ===
There are approximately 79 ferries between Mallorca and other destinations every week, most of them to mainland Spain.

- Baleària
  - to the Balearic Islands from Dénia, Valencia and Barcelona
- Trasmediterránea
  - Mainland-Baleares: regular lines, in both directions, from:
    - Barcelona to Palma de Mallorca, Ibiza and Mahón.
    - Valencia to Palma de Mallorca, Ibiza and Mahón.
    - Gandia to Palma de Mallorca and Ibiza.

=== Cycling ===
One of Europe's most popular cycling destinations, Mallorca cycling routes such as the popular 24 km cycle track (segregated cycle lane) which runs between Porto Cristo and Cala Bona via Sa Coma and Cala Millor are must rides.

== Notable Mallorcans ==
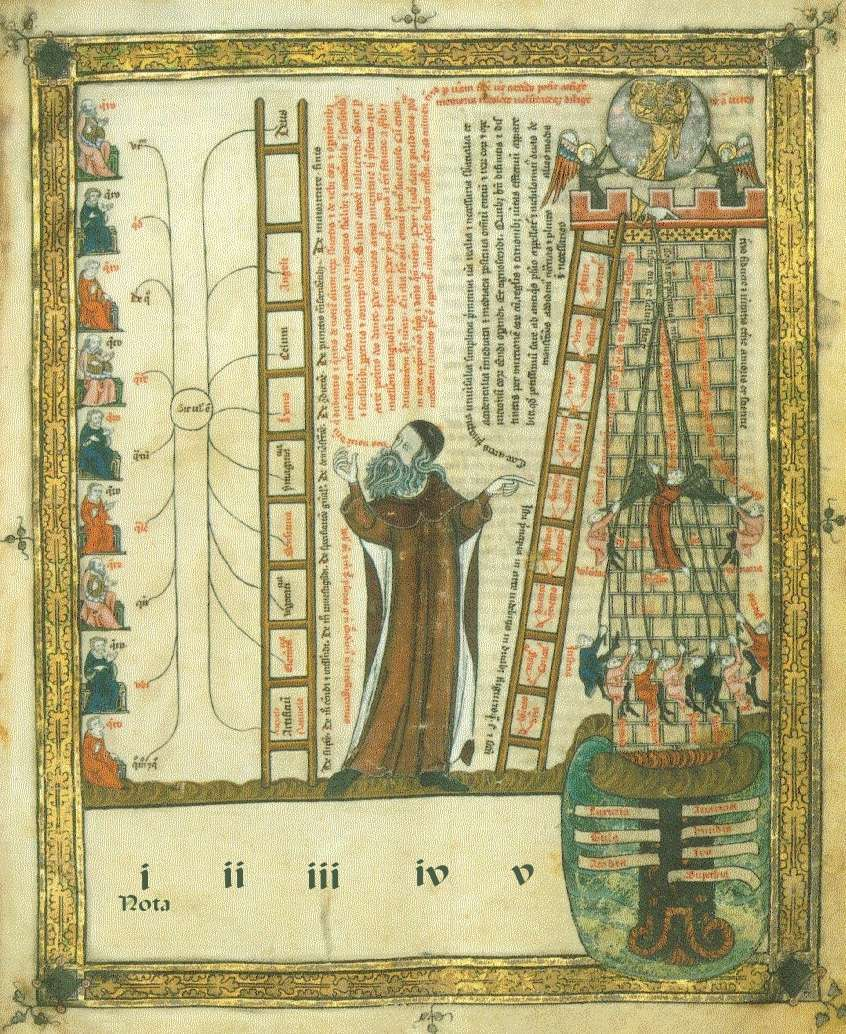
Ars magna, by Ramon Llull

Some of the earliest famous Mallorcans lived on the island before its reconquest from the Moors. Famous Mallorcans include:

- Ramon Llull, a medieval friar, writer and philosopher, who wrote the first major work of Catalan Literature;
- Al-Humaydī, Moorish historian, born on the island in 1029.
- Abraham Cresques, a 14th-century Jewish cartographer of the Majorcan cartographic school from Palma, believed to be the author of the Catalan Atlas;
- Catalina Tomas, 16th-century canoness and mystic, one of the patron saints of the island
- Junípero Serra, the Franciscan friar who founded the mission chain in Alta California in 1769.
- Miquel Costa i Llobera, a famous Mallorcan poet, who wrote The Pine of Formentor.
- Joaquín Jovellar y Soler, 19th century military commander.
- Antonio Maura, two-time Spanish Prime Minister during the reign of King Alfonso XIII.
- Robert Graves, English writer and poet who lived for many years in Mallorca, buried in a small churchyard on a hill at Deià
- Joan Daurer, painter active between 1358-1374.

=== Notable residents, alive in modern times ===
- Eaktay Ahn (1906–1965), founder of the Balearic Symphony Orchestra and composer of the Korean national anthem, lived in Mallorca from 1946 until his death in 1965.
- Jeffrey Archer, English novelist, owns a villa in Mallorca.
- Marco Asensio, Spanish footballer, was born in Palma de Mallorca.
- Miquel Barceló, contemporary painter, created sculptures in Palma Cathedral.
- Concha Buika, contemporary flamenco singer. Buika was born on 11 May 1972, in Palma de Mallorca.
- Jean Batten, New Zealand aviator, died in Mallorca in 1982.
- Conor Benn, British professional boxer, spent twelve years of his childhood living in Mallorca.
- Nigel Benn, British former professional boxer who moved with his family to Mallorca following the conclusion of his boxing career.
- Maria del Mar Bonet, musician, member of the Catalan language group Els Setze Jutges in the 1960s with brother Joan Ramon Bonet.
- Samuel Bouriah (better known as DJ Sammy), dance artist and producer.
- Faye Emerson and Anne Lindsay Clark, divorcees of Elliott Roosevelt and John Aspinwall Roosevelt (US Officials and sons of Franklin Delano Roosevelt) respectively, retired to Mallorca in 1965. Emerson died in Deià in 1983.
- Sheila Ferguson, former member of the Three Degrees.
- Rudy Fernández, Spanish former professional basketball player.
- Curt Flood, baseball player, purchased a bar in Palma de Mallorca after leaving the Washington Senators in 1971.
- Antònia Font, contemporary pop band in the Mallorcan dialect of Catalan.
- Toni Kroos, German former professional footballer for Real Madrid and Germany national football team.
- Cynthia Lennon (1939–2015), former wife of John Lennon, lived and died in Mallorca.
- Jorge Lorenzo, professional motorcycle road racer, won the world 250cc Grand Prix motorcycle title in 2006 and 2007, and the 2010, 2012 & 2015 MotoGP World Championships.
- Colm Meaney, Irish actor, resides in the town of Sóller.
- Mads Mikkelsen, Danish actor, purchased a vacation home in Mallorca, where he spends most of his time.
- Joan Mir, professional motorcycle road racer and 2020 MotoGP World Champion.
- Carlos Moyá, former world No.1 tennis player and coach of Rafael Nadal.
- Xisco Muñoz, former footballer and coach (FC Dinamo Tbilisi, Watford F.C), was born in Manacor.
- Rafael Nadal, 22-time major champion and former world No. 1 tennis player, lives in Manacor.
- Toni Nadal, Rafael Nadal's uncle and his former coach.
- Miguel Ángel Nadal, Rafael Nadal's uncle, former FC Barcelona and Spanish international footballer.
- John Noakes, former British TV presenter, lived in Andratx.
- Jean Emile Oosterlynck, Flemish painter, lived in Mallorca from 1979 until his death in 1996.
- Hana Soukupova, supermodel, owns a villa in Mallorca.
- José María Sicilia, painter, resides in the town of Sóller.
- Jørn Utzon, an architect best known for designing the Sydney Opera House, designed and built two houses in Mallorca, Can Lis and Can Feliz.
- Agustí Villaronga (born 1953), filmmaker, was born in Palma de Mallorca.

== Gallery ==
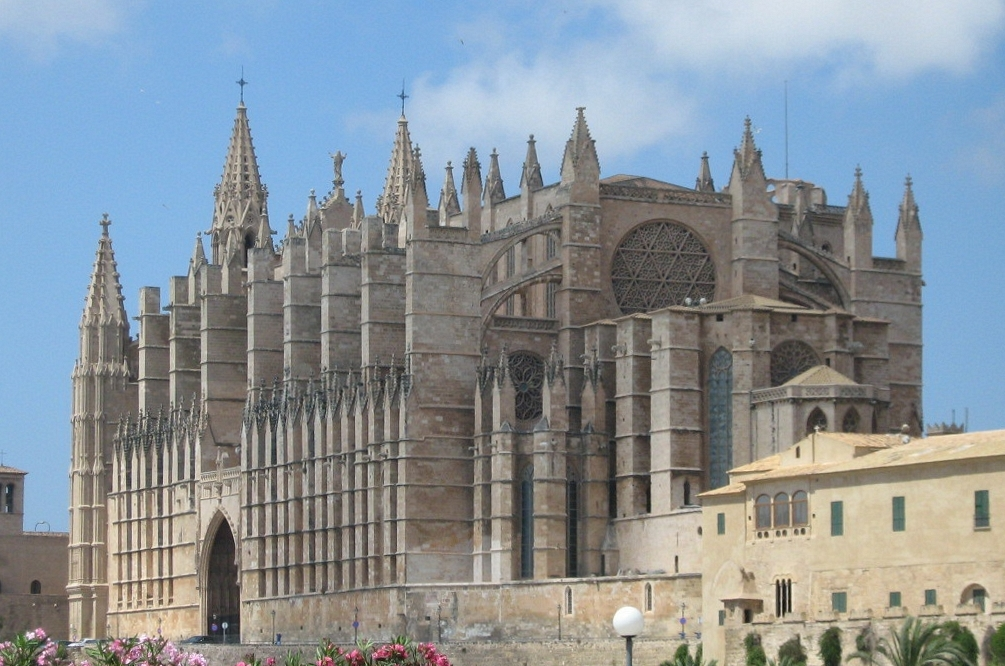
La Seu, Palma Cathedral

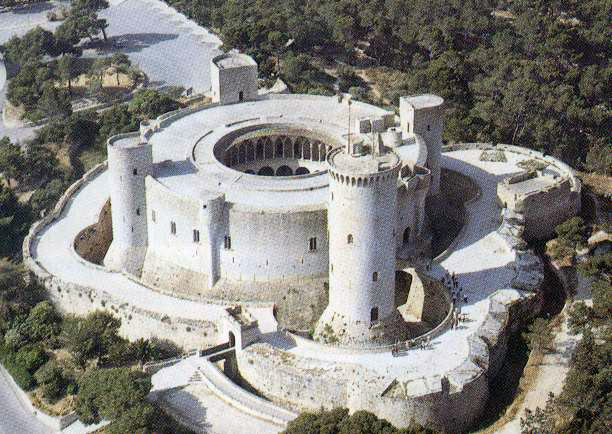
Bellver Castle

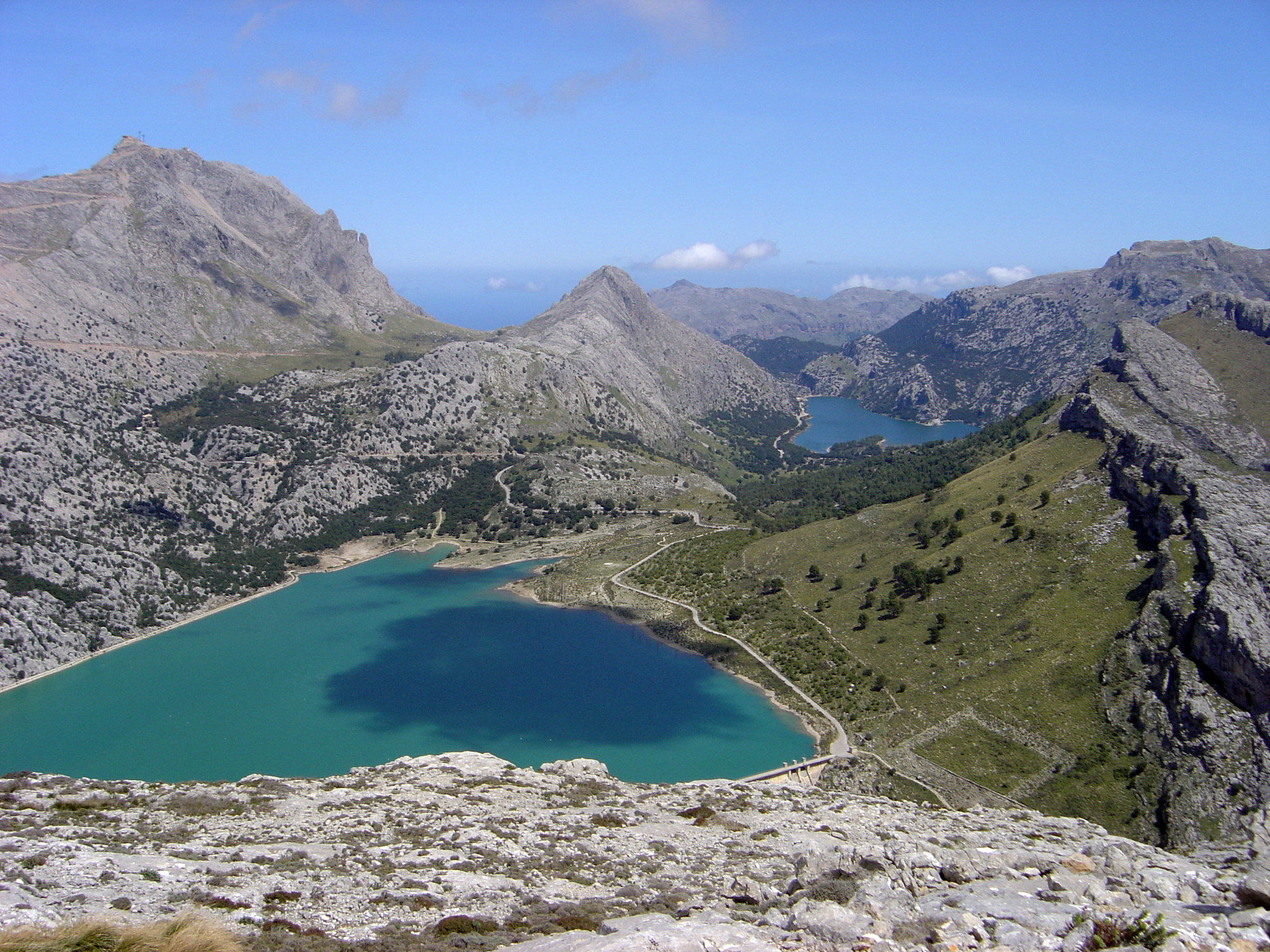
Lakes Cúber and Gorg Blau, Serra de Tramuntana

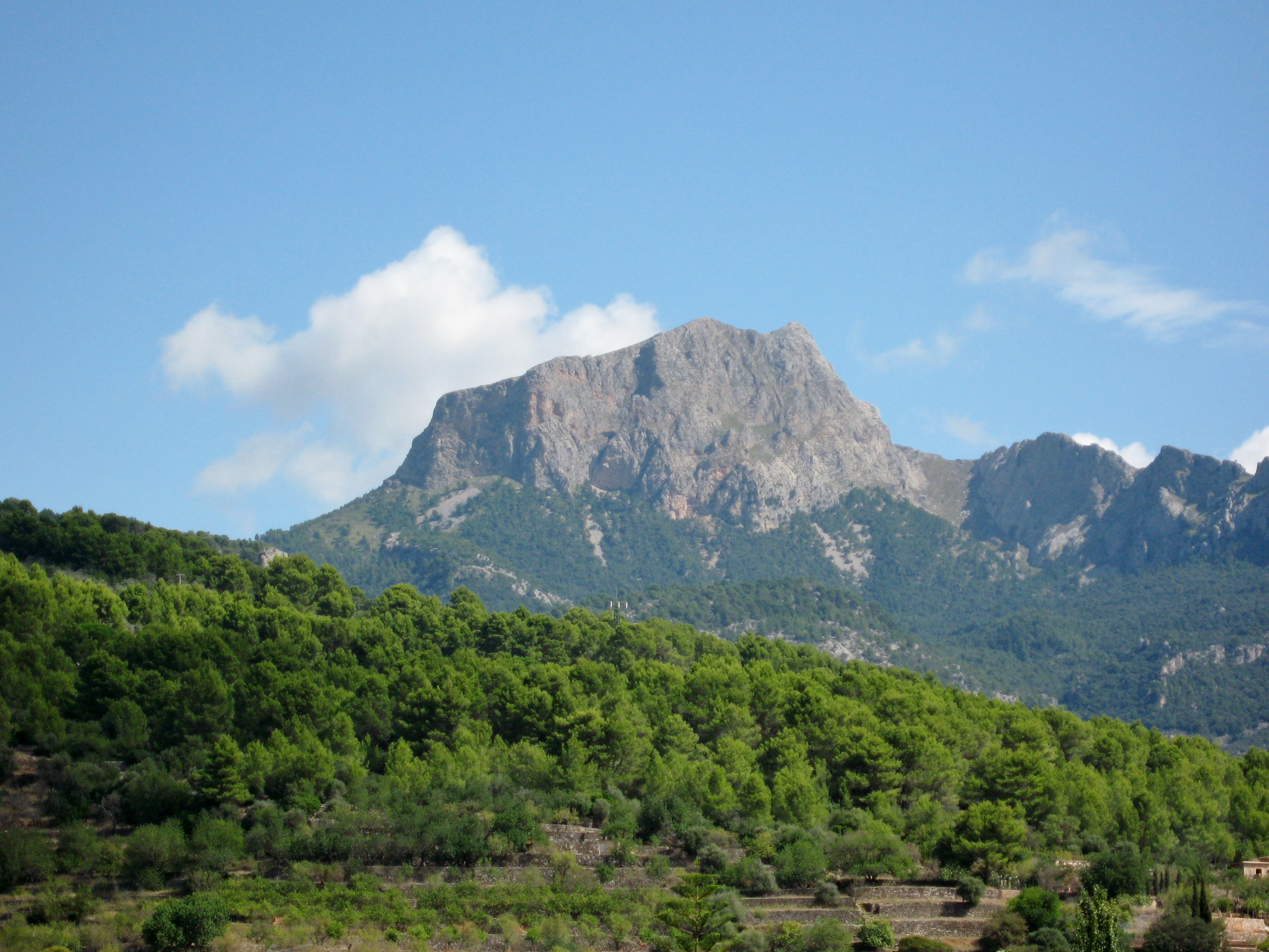
Puig Major, highest peak in Mallorca

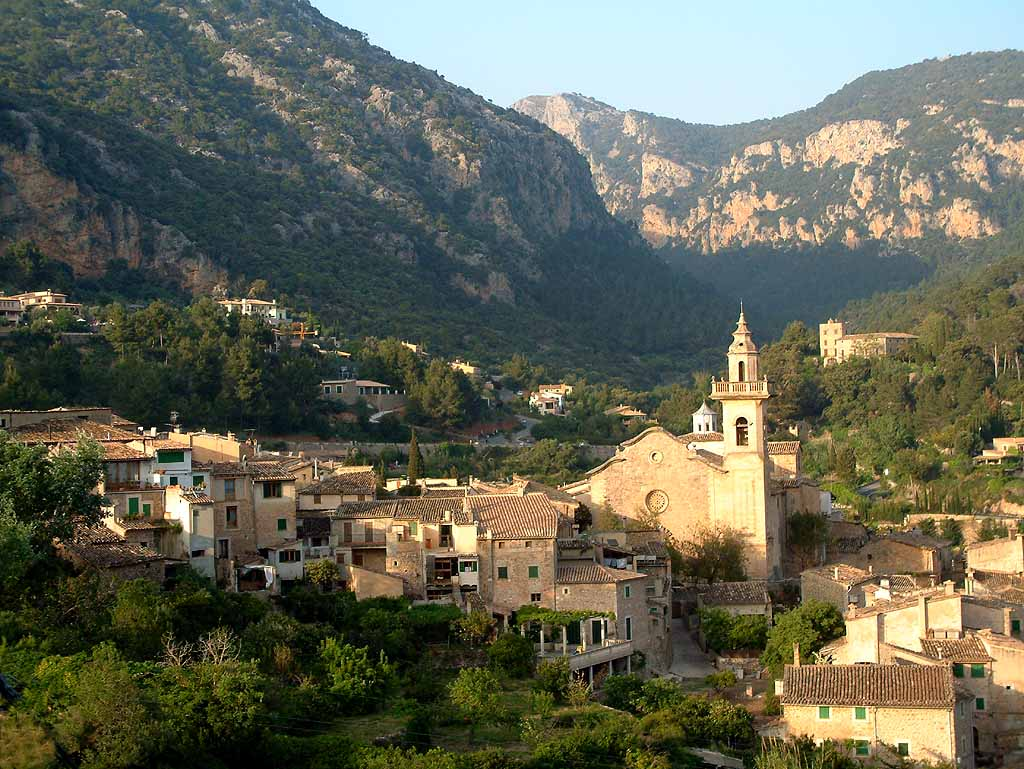
Valldemossa

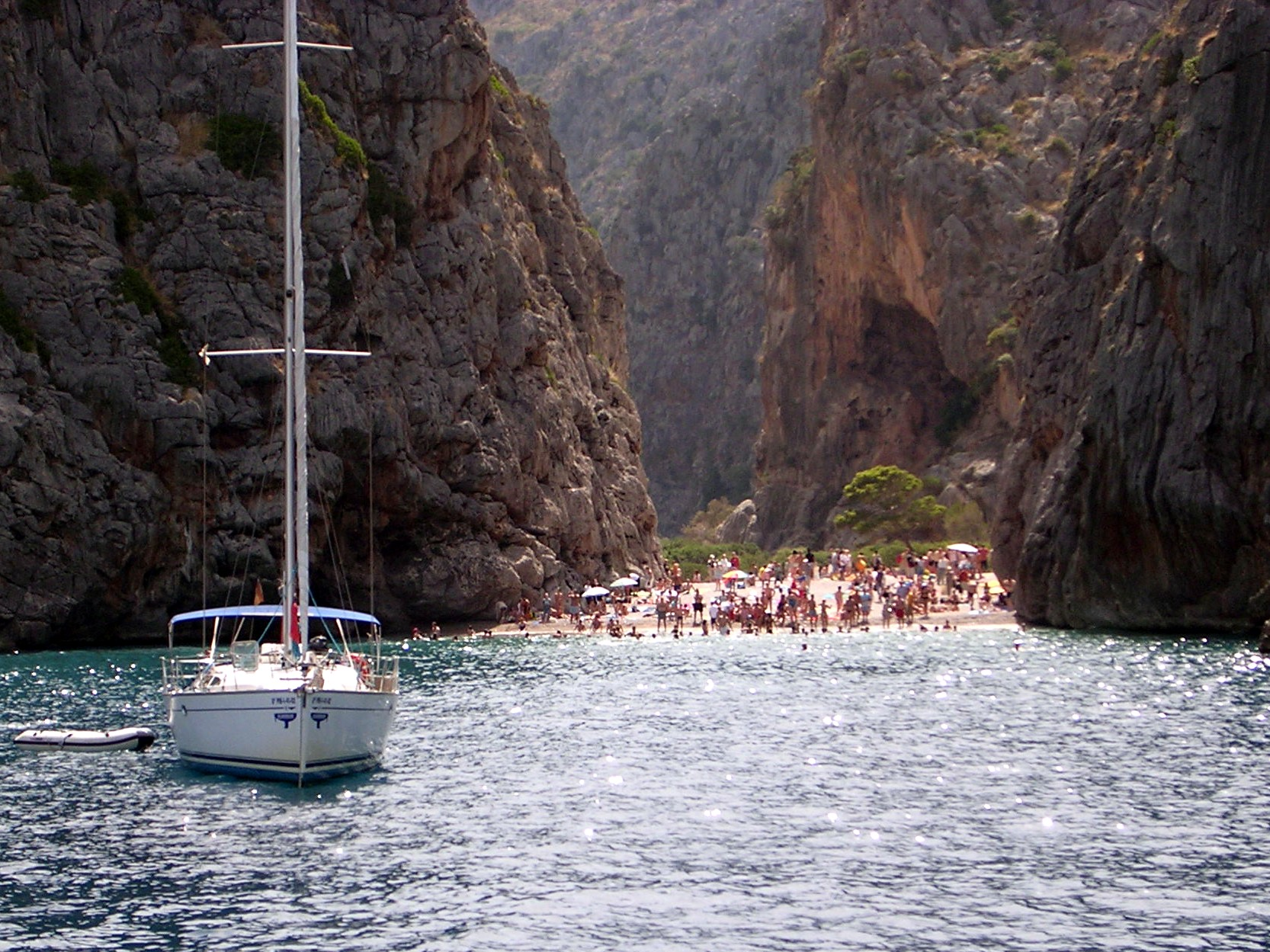
Sa Calobra, Escorca

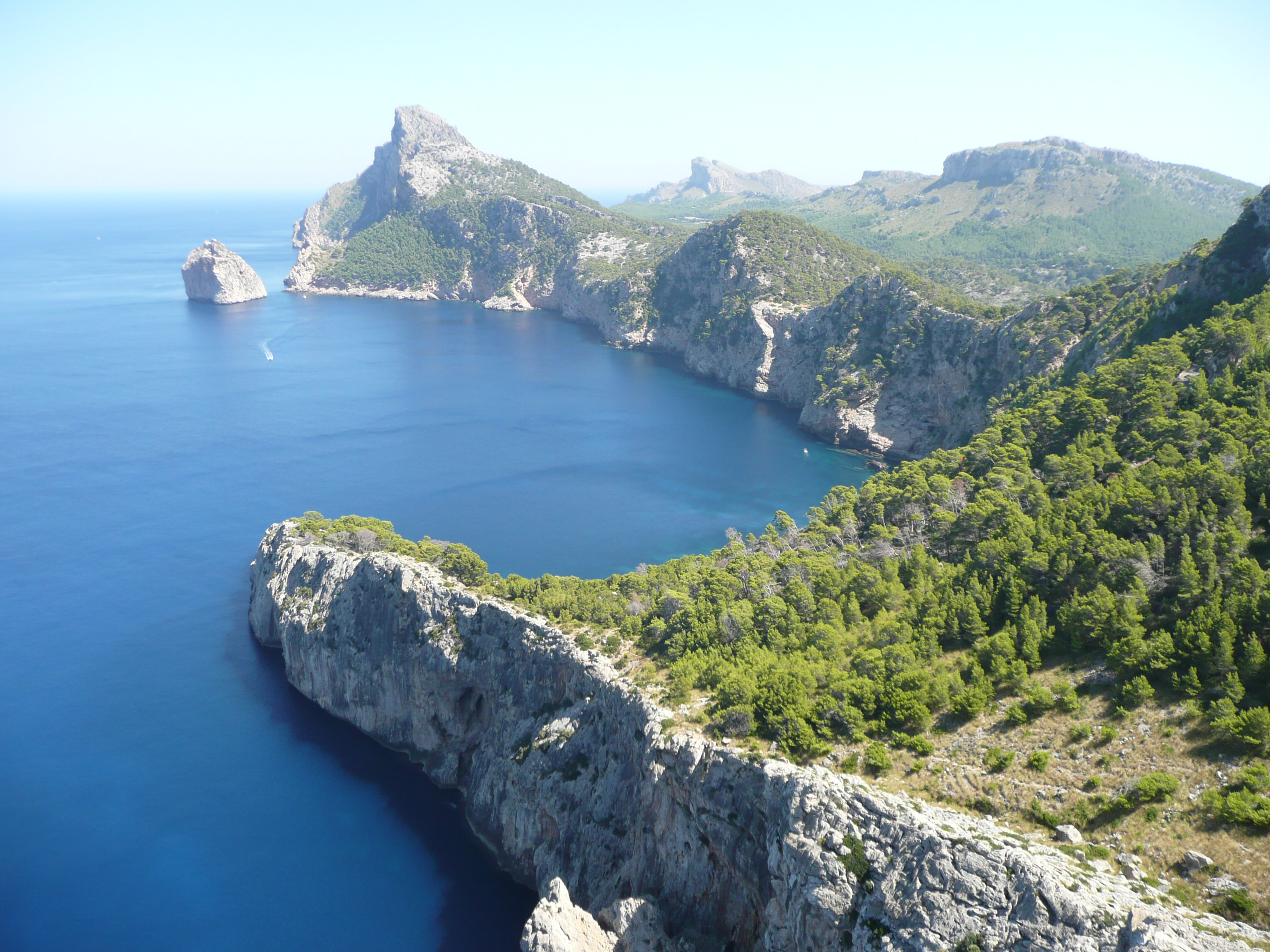
Cap de Formentor

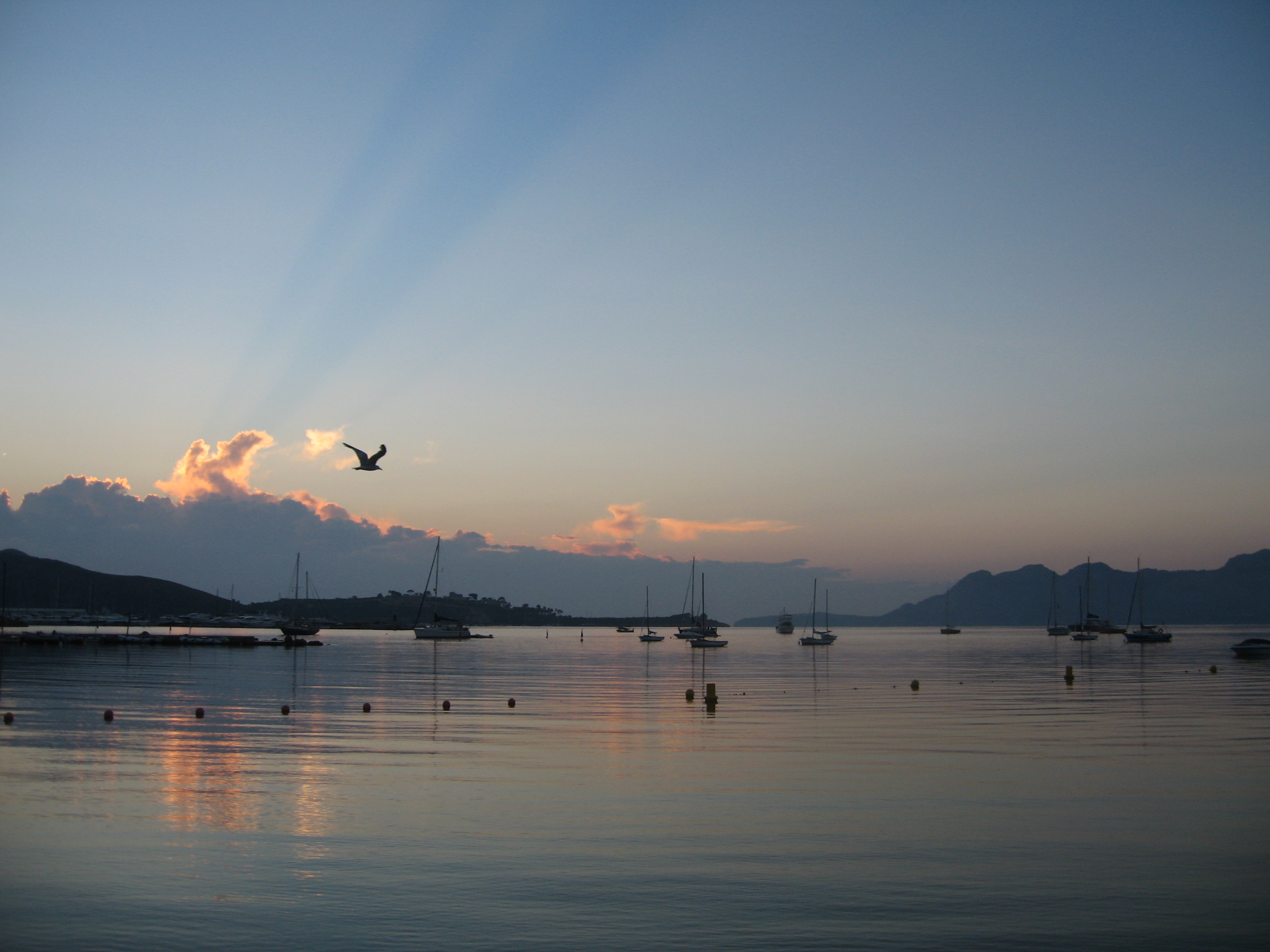
Sunrise across Pollensa Bay, Port de Pollença

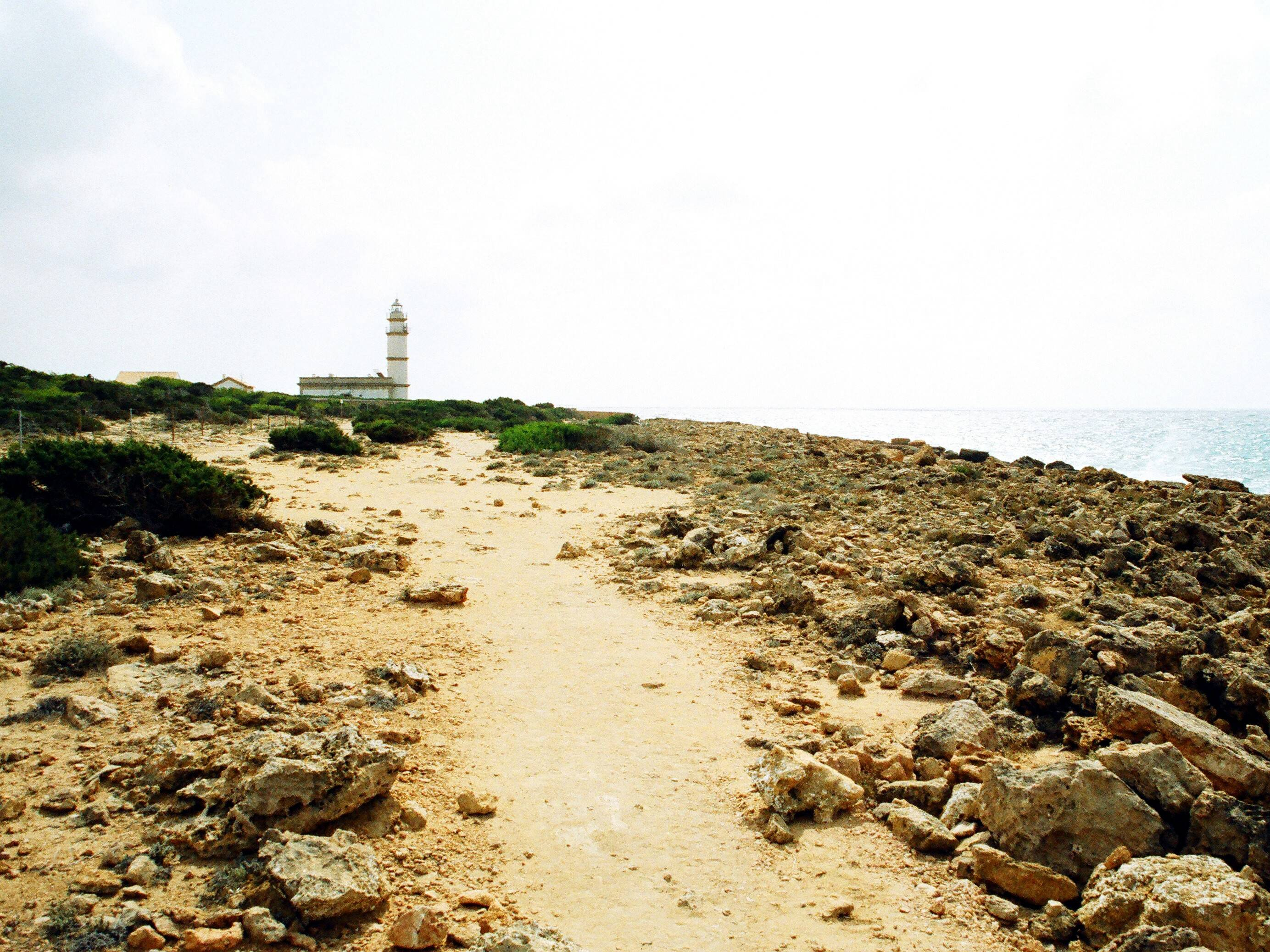
Cap de Ses Salines

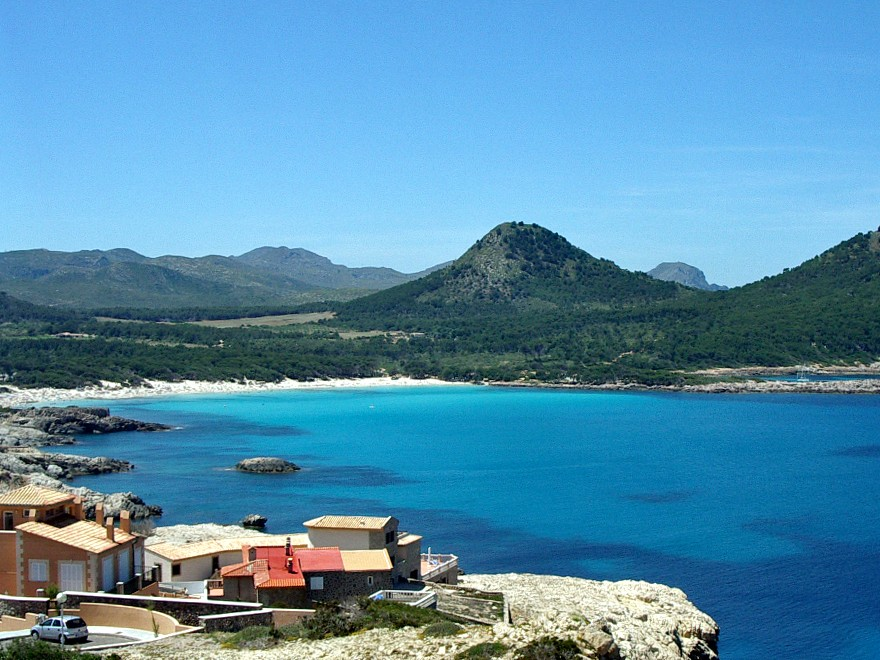
Cala Agulla, Capdepera

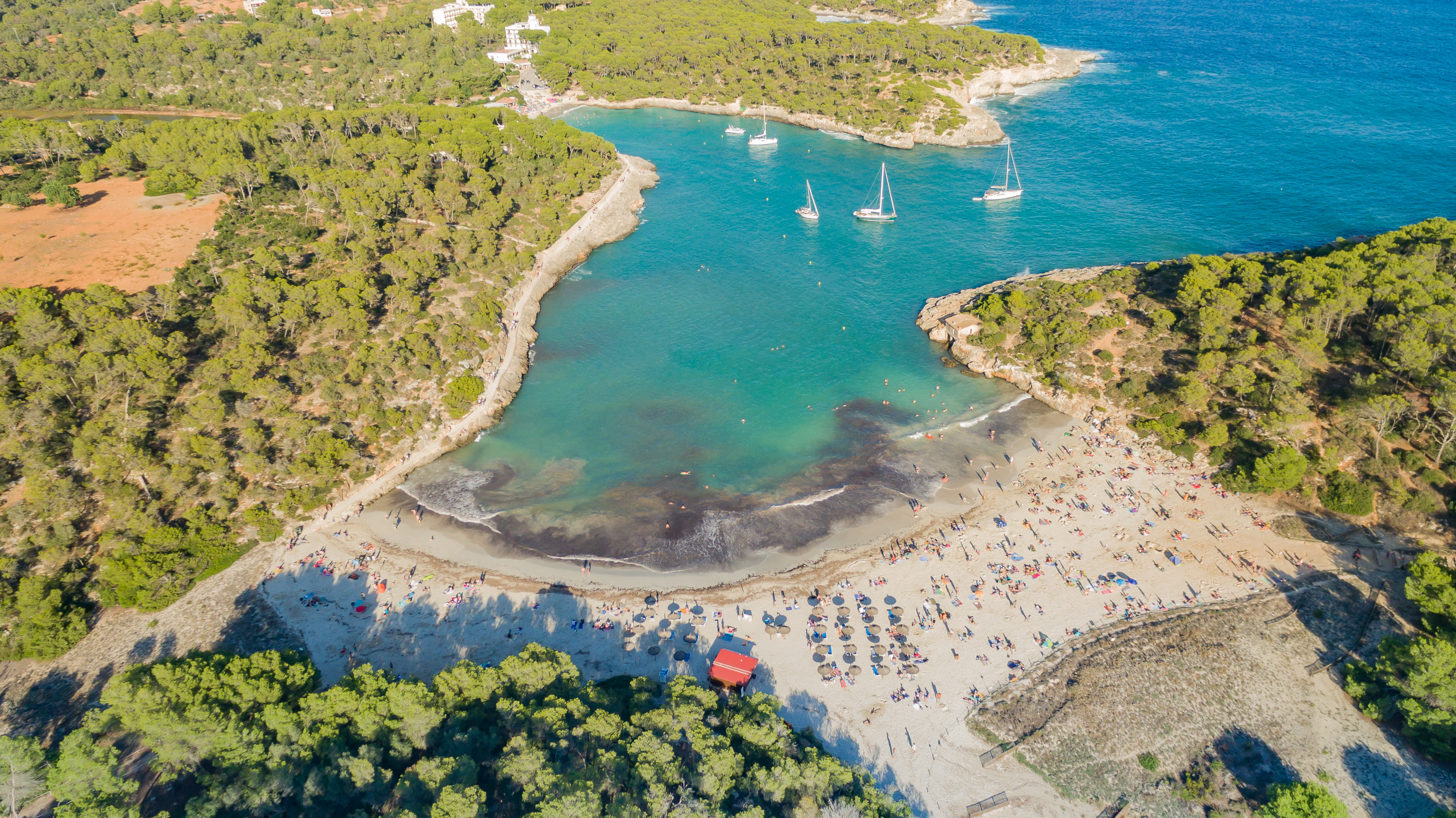
Aerial of Cala Amarador beach

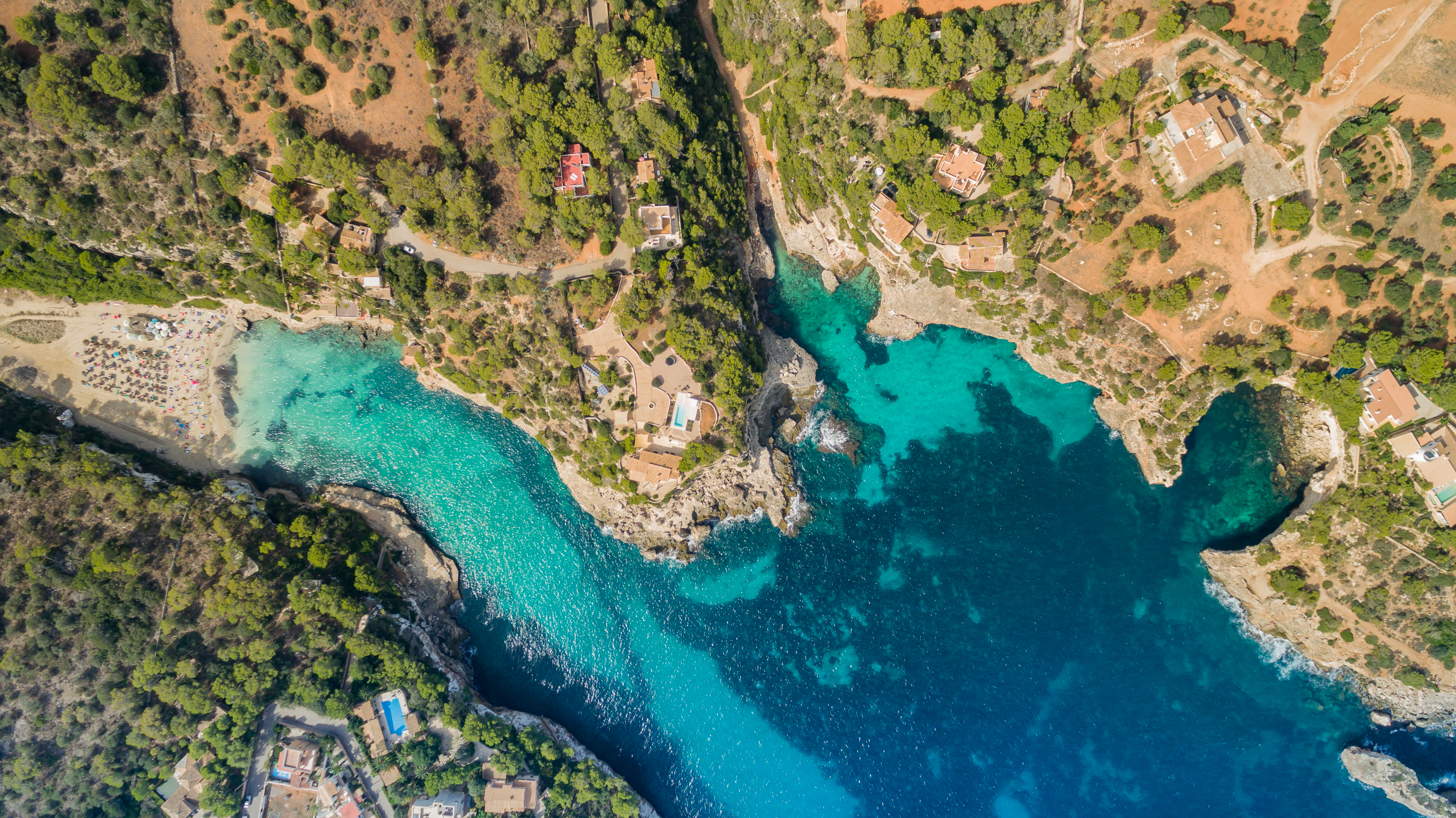
Aerial of Cala Llombards beach

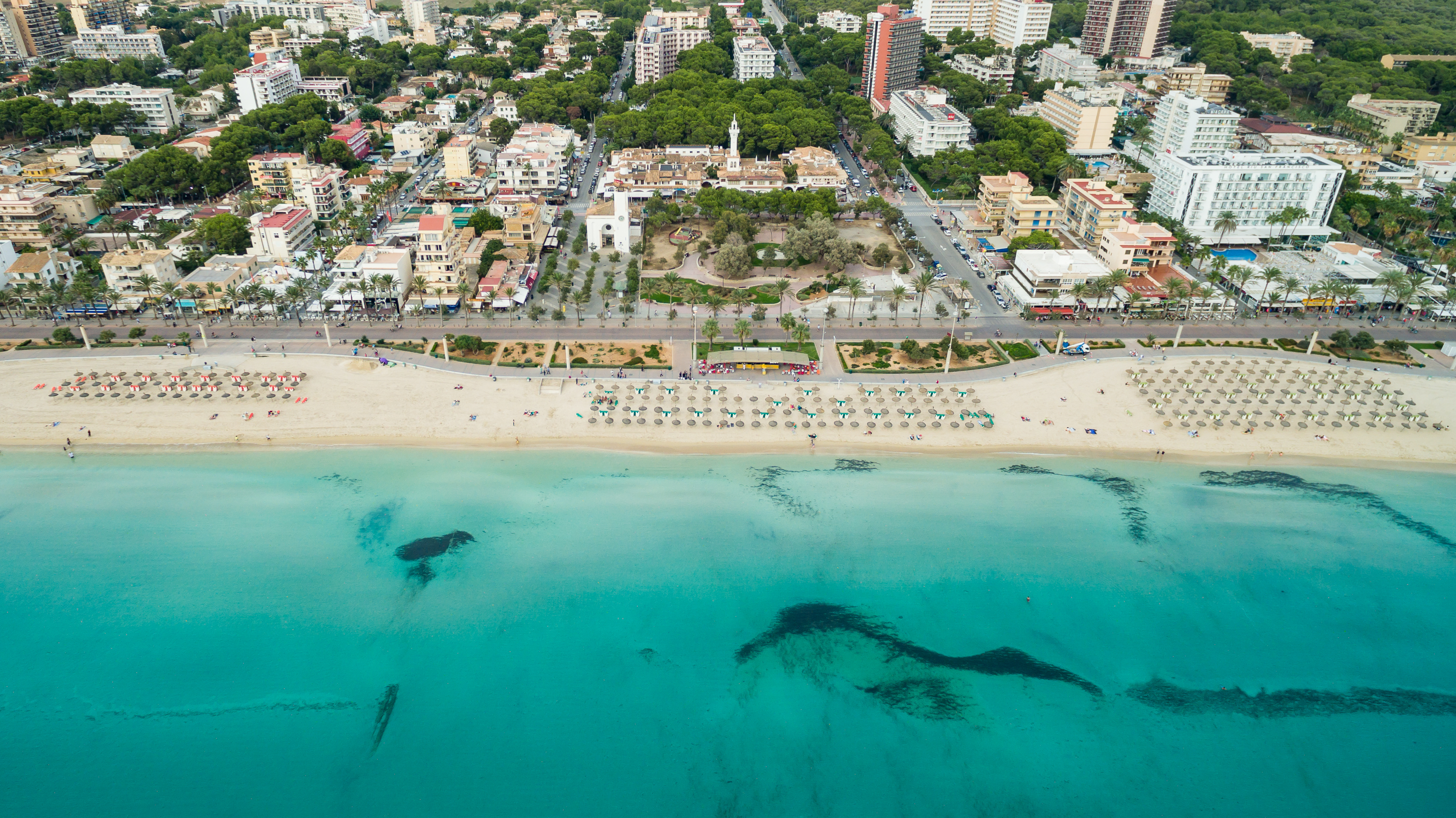
Platja de Palma beach

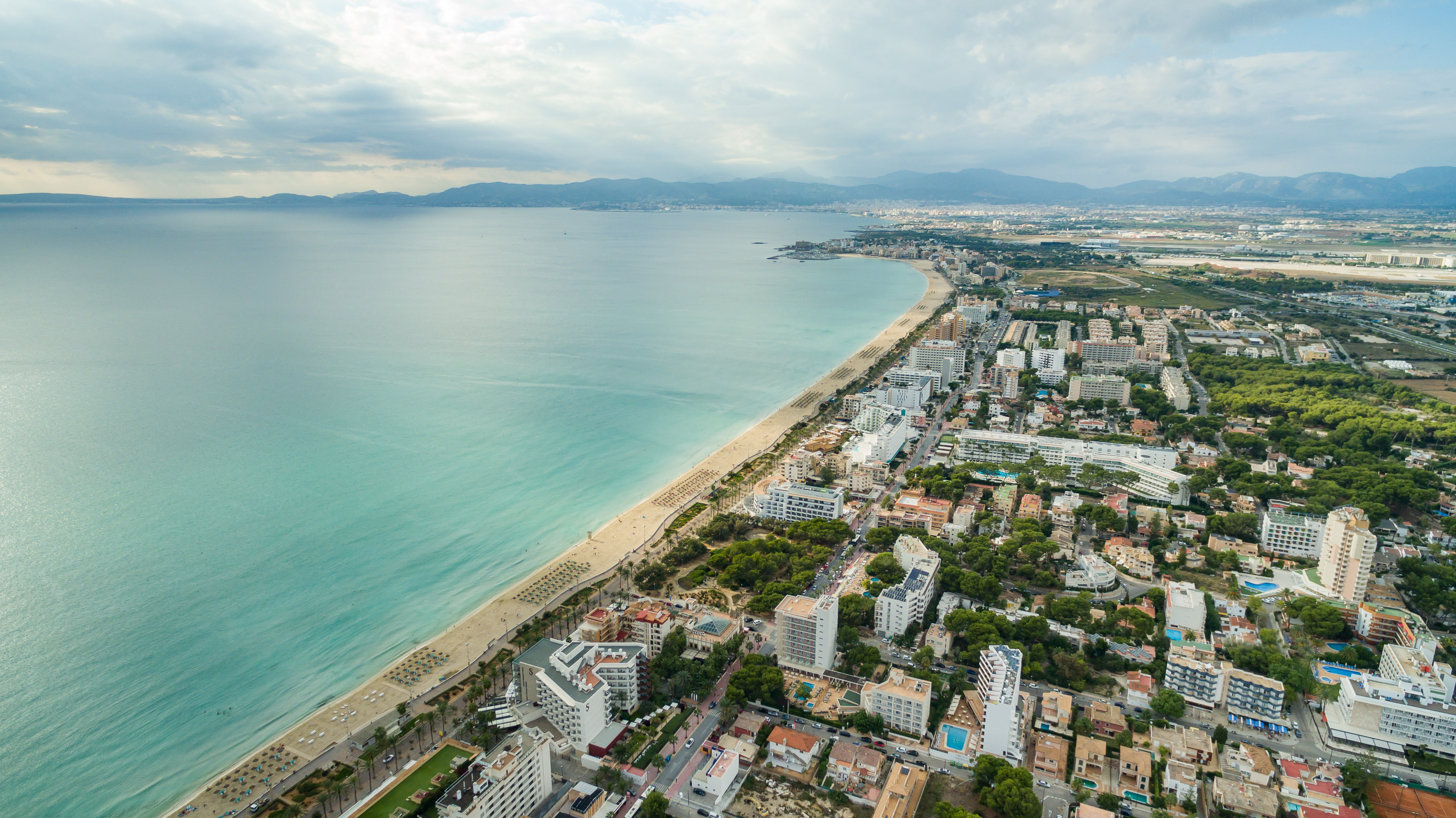
Aerial of Platja de Palma beach

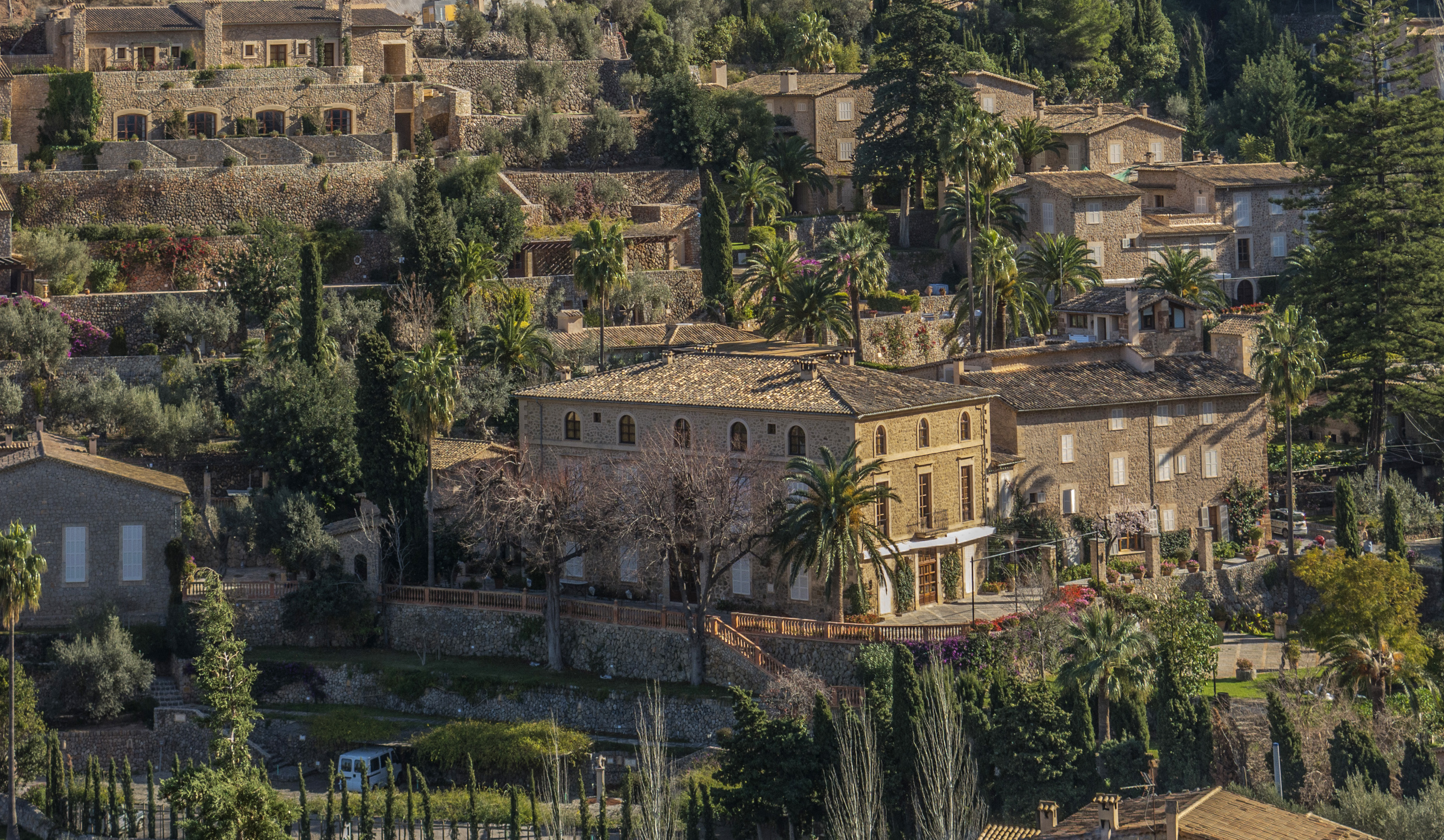
Deià

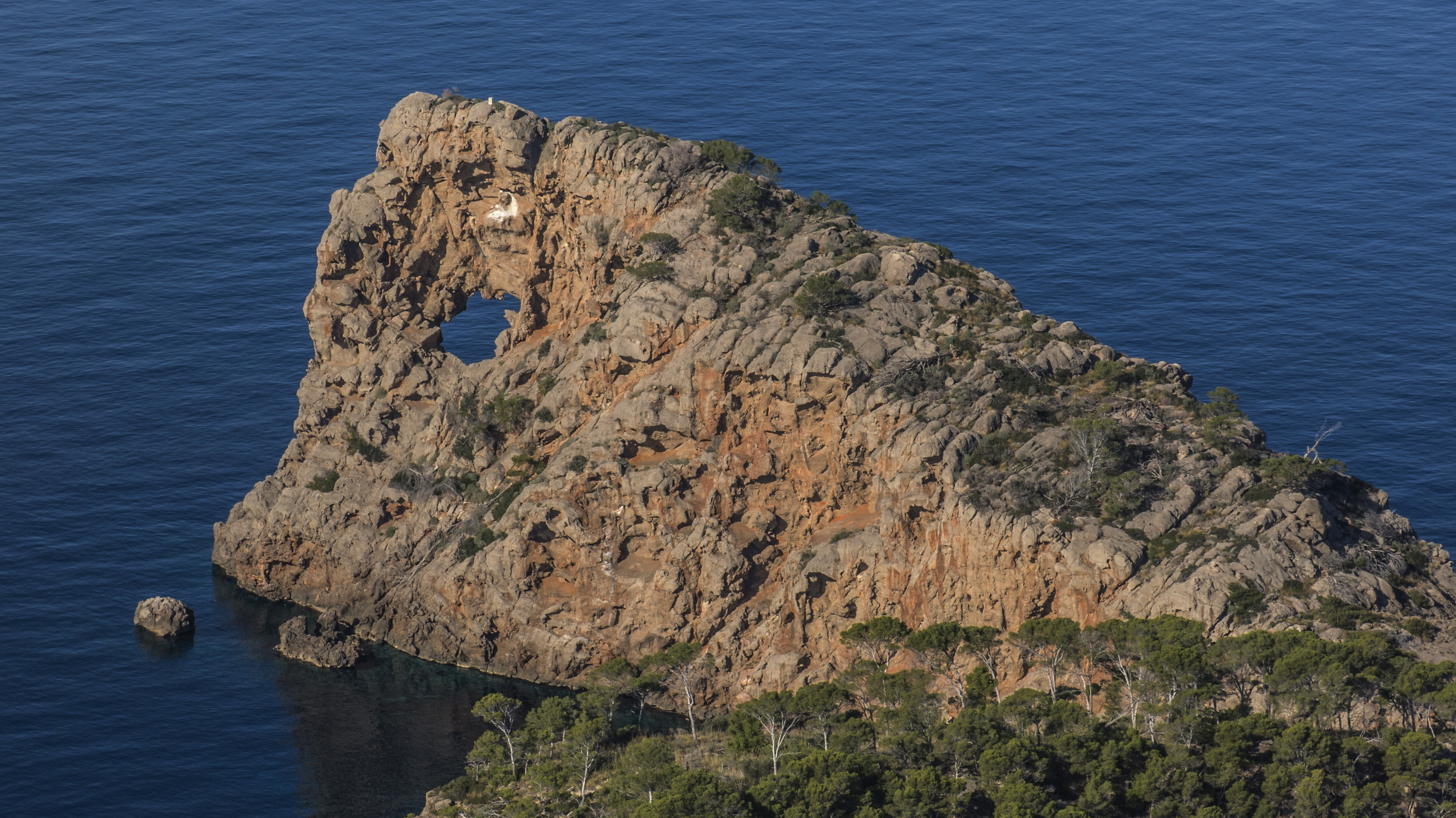
Sa Foradada

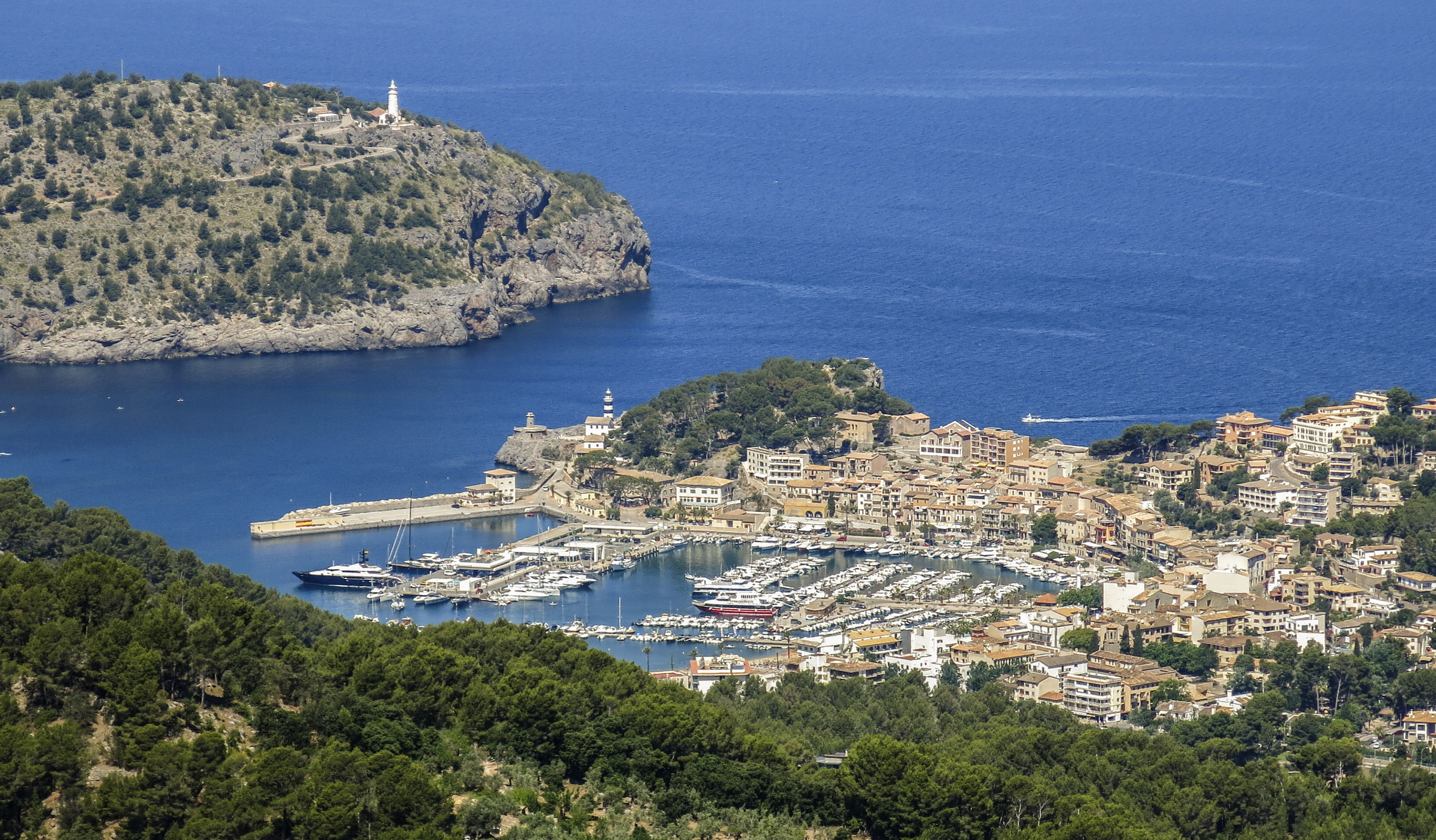
Port de Sóller

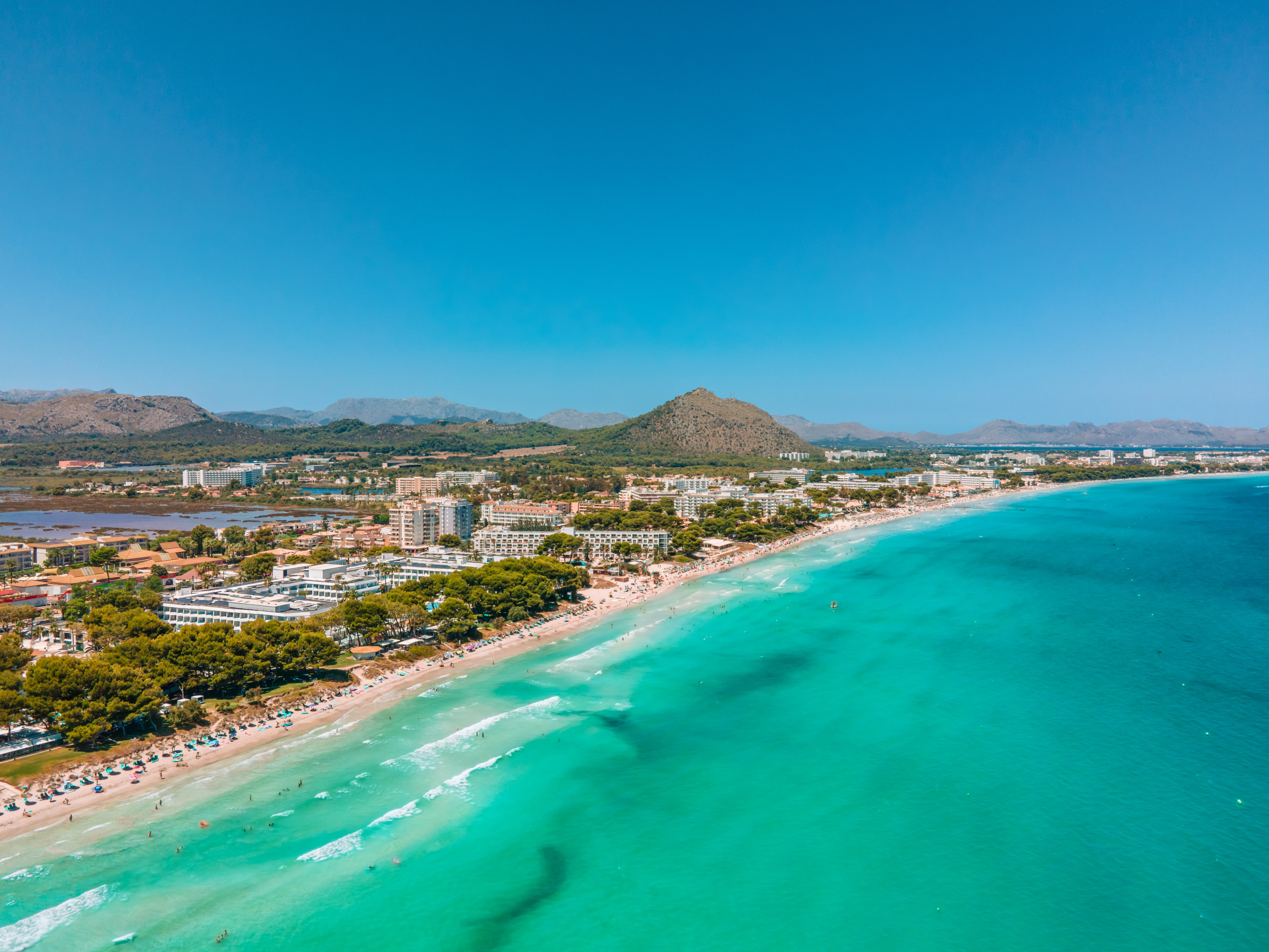
Platja de Muro

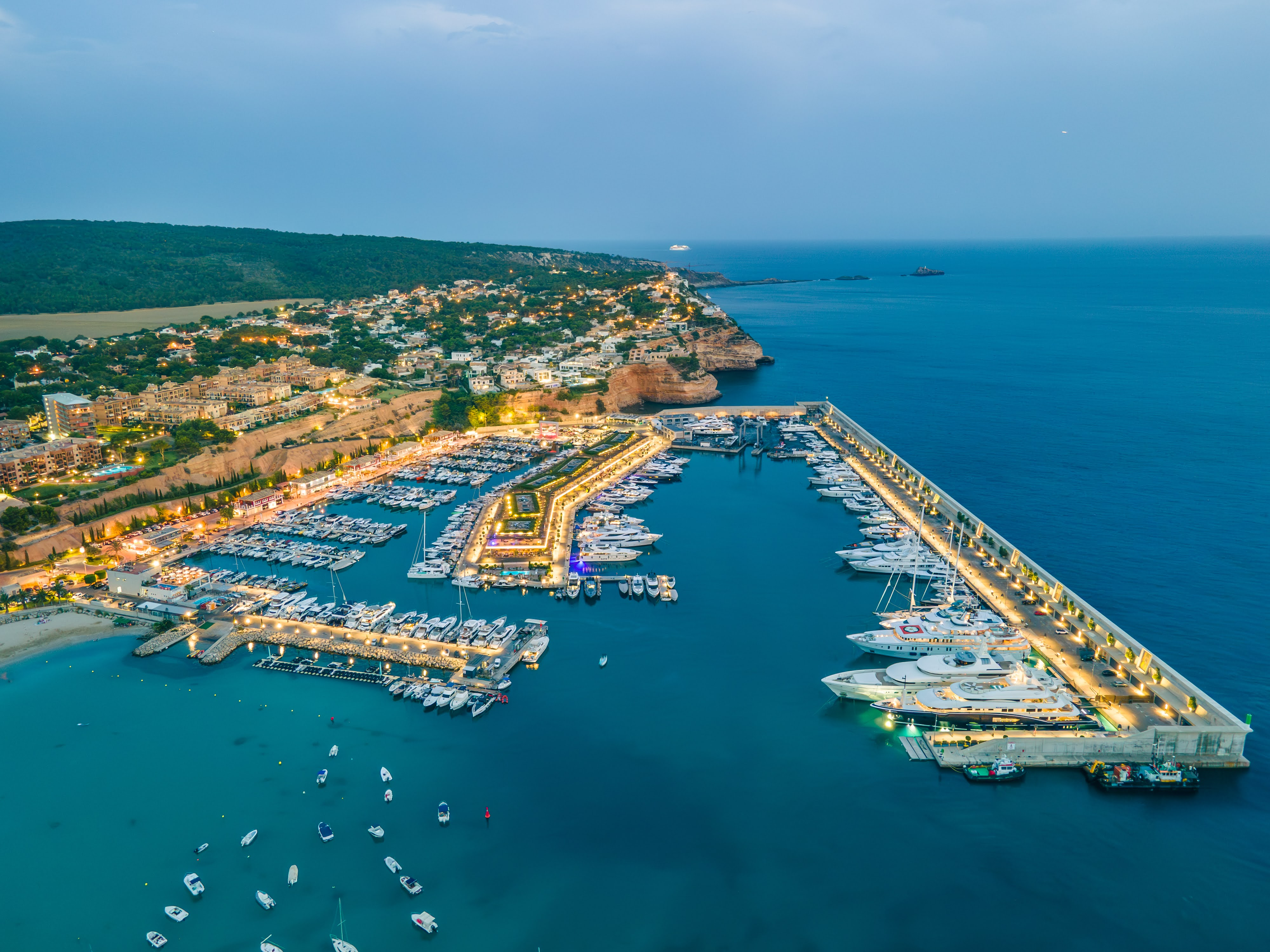
Port Adriano

== See also ==
- Gymnesian Islands
- Observatorio Astronómico de Mallorca
- RCD Mallorca – local association football club
