= Galatzó =

Coordinates: 39°31′25.42″N 2°29′53.09″E

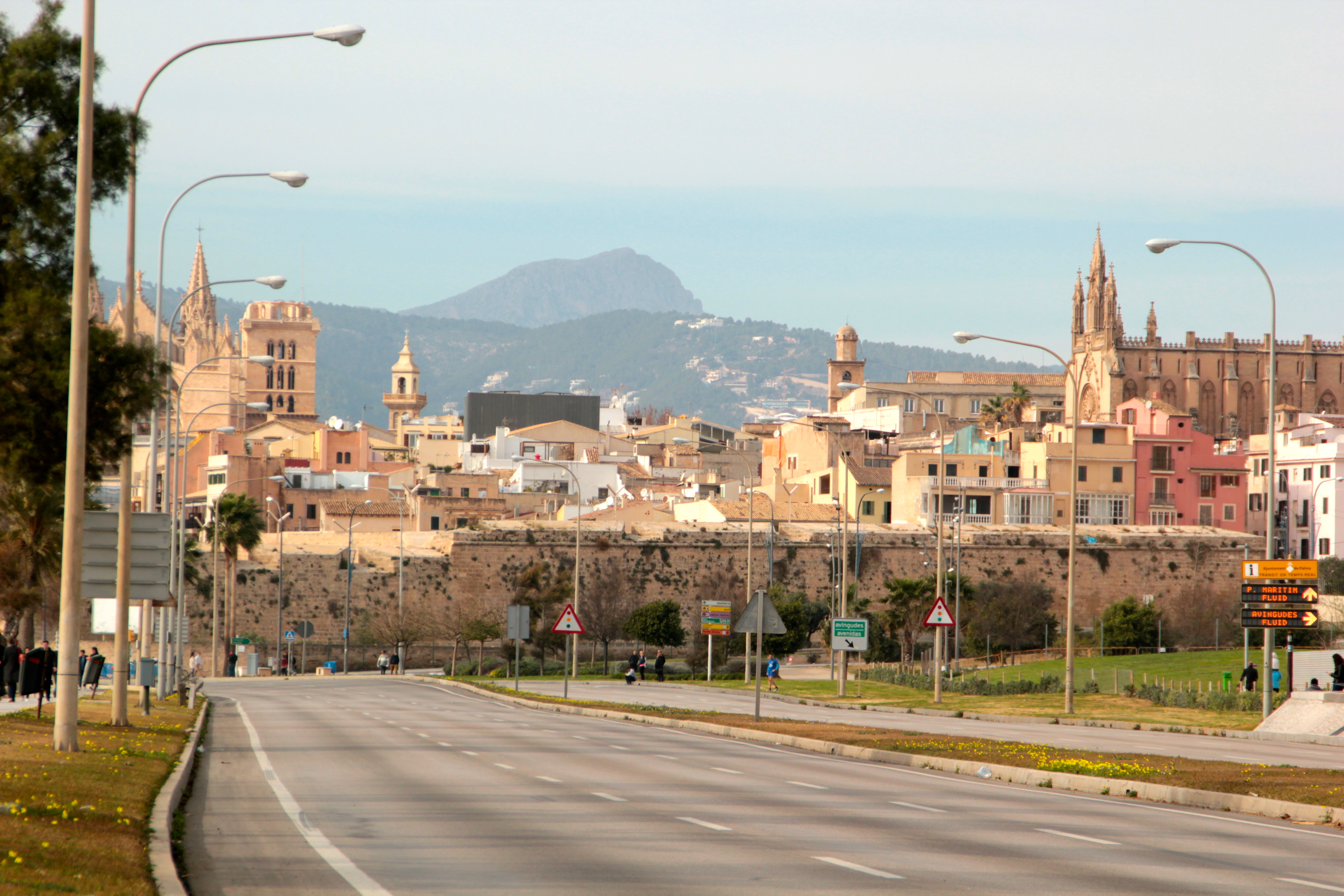

Galatzó is a settlement in the municipality of Calvià on the island of Majorca, part of the Spanish autonomous community of the Balearic Islands. It is located in Pillo and neighbors Santa Ponsa, Paguera, and Son Ferrer.

Construction began in the late 1970s. It was a project of the cooperative Pablo Iglesias who took the initiative for social housing in the municipality. It has schools, a sports hall, a bowling club, and other forms of entertainment. The most famous landmark is the mill of Santa Ponsa, located next to the roundabout junction of the Palma-Andratx and Santa Ponsa, Calvià. The mill was restored in a project created by a municipal school workshop.

Galatzó has a registered population of 1598 inhabitants.
