= Portals Nous =

Neighborhood in Calvià, Mallorca, Spain

Coordinates: 39°31′59.68″N 2°34′12.08″E

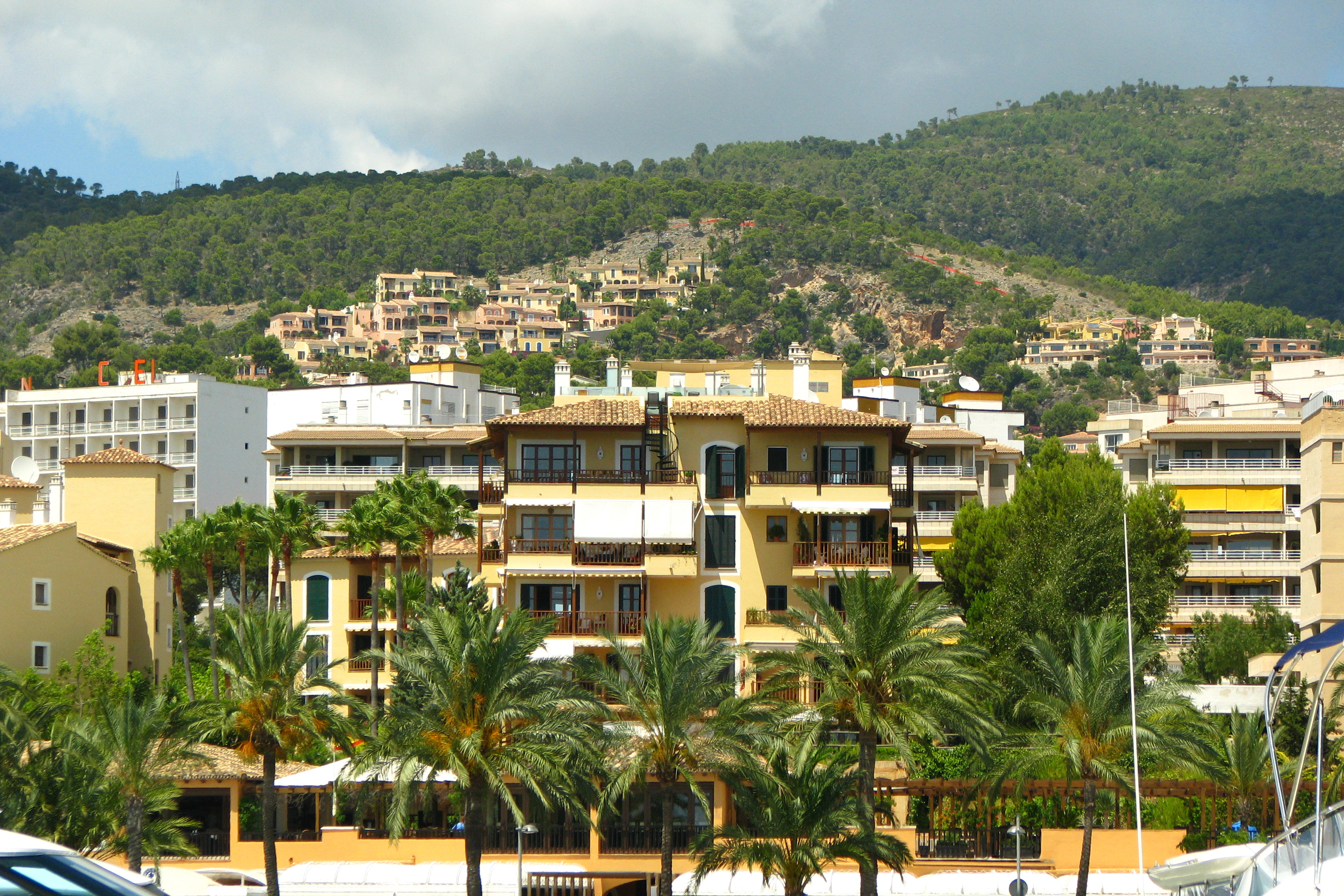
view

Portals Nous is a neighborhood in the municipality of Calvià on the island of Mallorca, part of the Spanish autonomous community of the Balearic Islands. It includes the residential neighborhood of Bendinat, and it is adjacent to El Toro to the west, La Porrassa the east, Son Ferrer north, and the sea to the south. It had its start in the 1930s, and now has a population of approximately 2,650 residents.

The town is a meeting place for businessmen, celebrities, high society figures and members of the Spanish royal family during their summer stays in the Marivent Palace.

Festivals are celebrated from 12 to 15 August. The marina is called Puerto Portals.
