= Portals Vells =

Coordinates: 39°29′44.57″N 2°28′19.36″E

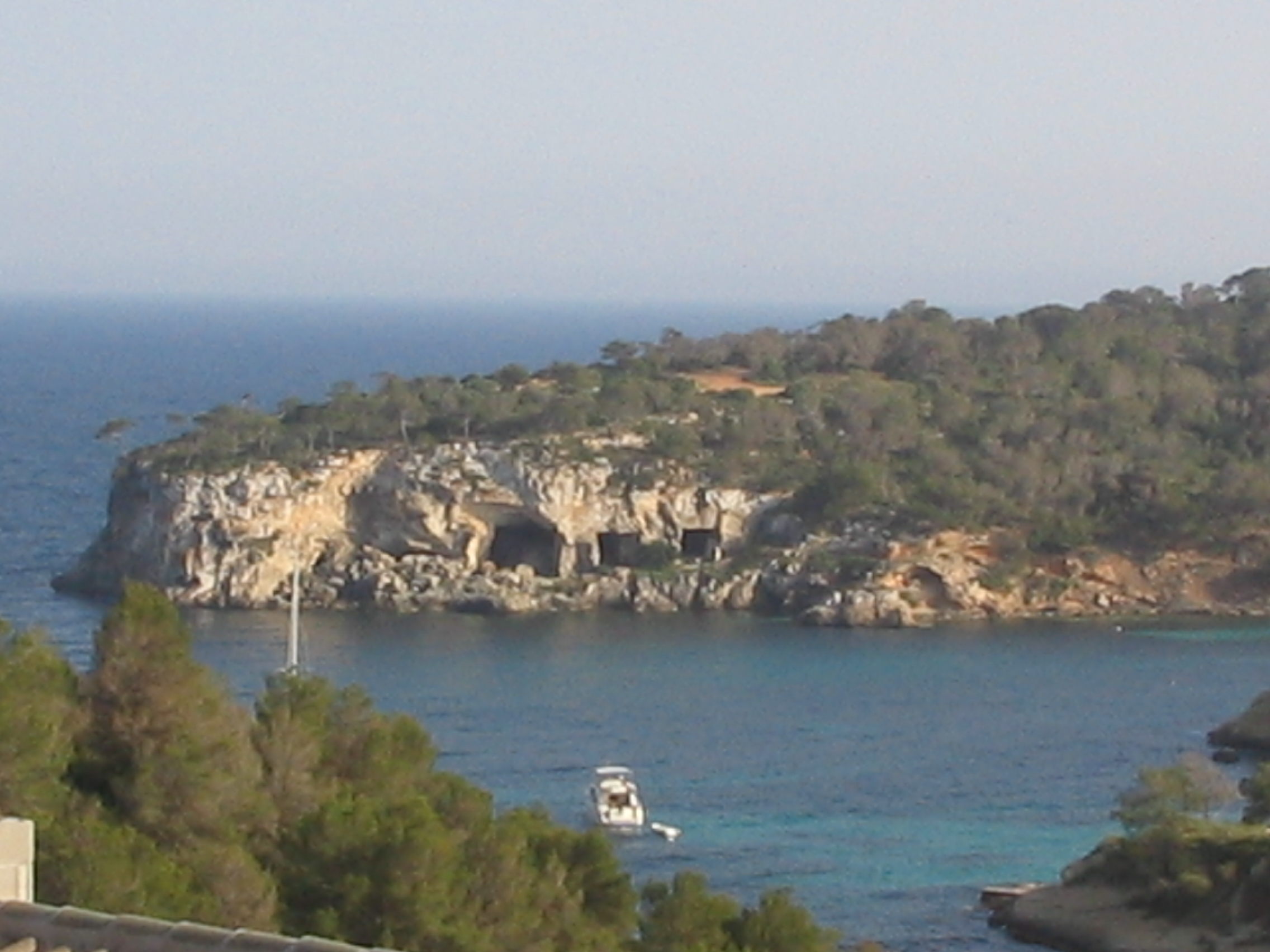
Caves of Portals Vells.

Portals Vells is a small village in the municipality of Calvià on the island of Majorca, part of the Spanish autonomous community of the Balearic Islands. It is adjacent to El Toro to the west, La Porrassa the east, Son Ferrer north, and the sea to the south. It has a small nudist cove, and another cove with two small beaches. The population is approximately 32 inhabitants.
