= Bover =

Bover is a surname. Notable people with the surname include:

- Joaquín María Bover de Roselló (1810–1865), Spanish writer and editor
- Miguel Bover (1928–1966), Spanish road bicycle racer
- Peter Bover (1772–1802), British Royal Navy officer
- Ruben Bover (born 1992), Spanish footballer
