= Serra de Na Burguesa =

Mountain on the Spanish island of Majorca

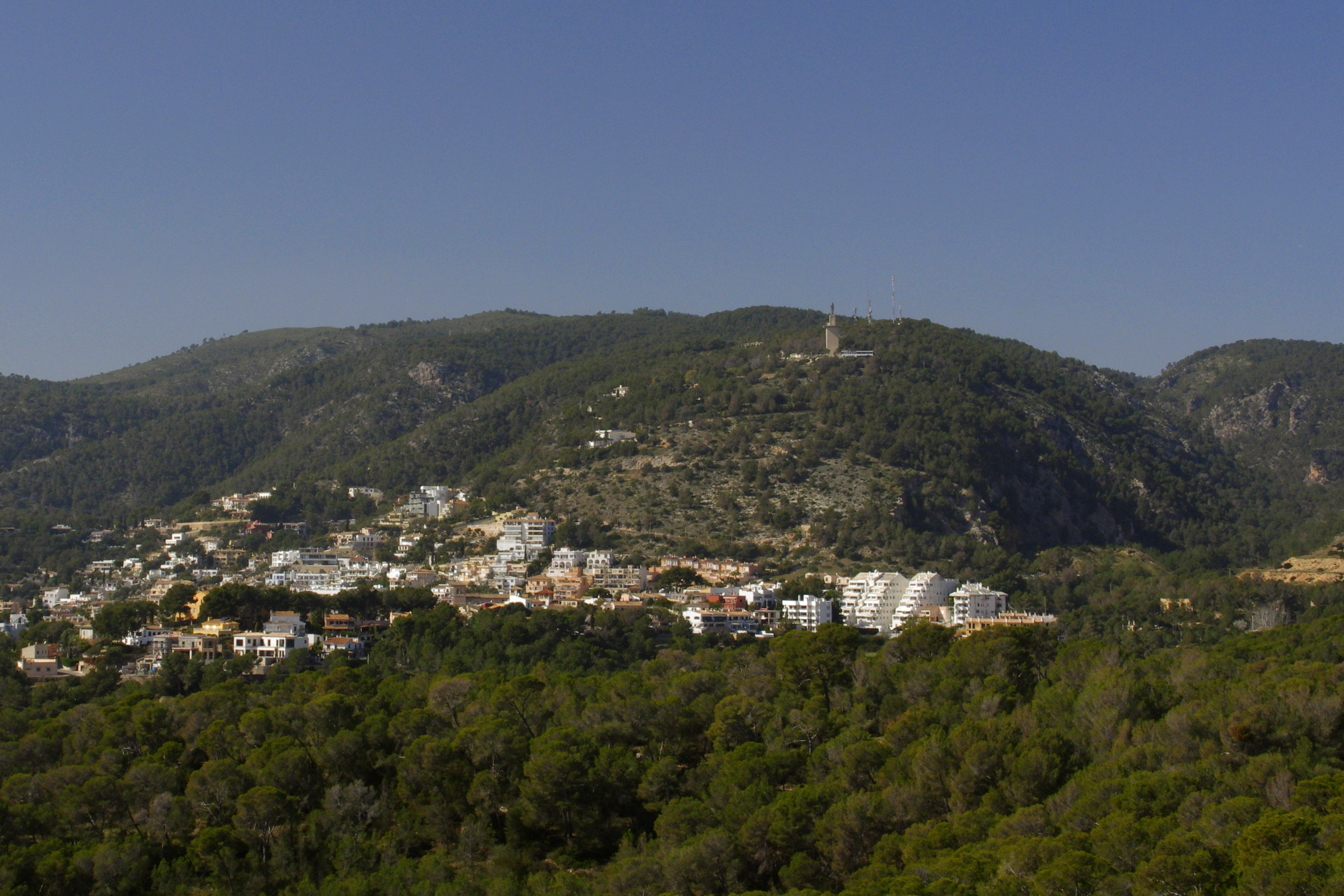
- Serra de na Burguesa (2019)

Highest point
- Peak: Puig d'en Bou
- Elevation: 503 m (1,650 ft)
- Coordinates: 39°34′14.75″N 02°33′27.92″E

Geography
- Country: Spain
- Region: Majorca

Serra de Na Burguesa (Balearic Catalan pronunciation: [ˈsɛrə ðə nə buɾˈɣəzə], formerly Serra de Portopí or Sierra de Porto Pi, meaning "Port of Pine Mountain") is a well-defined mountain on the island of Majorca, part of the Spanish autonomous community of the Balearic Islands. It is the southernmost portion of the Serra de Tramuntana range, terminating in the Mediterranean Sea at Bay of Palma. Na Burguesa is located approximately halfway between Santa Ponsa and Palma. The municipality of Calvià is located between Na Burguesa and Serra de Tramuntana.

== History ==
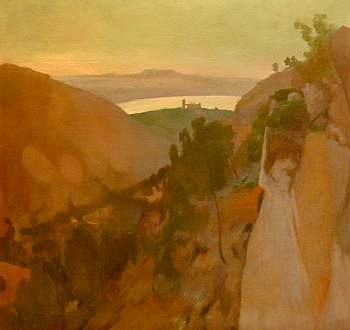
Antoni Gelabert painting of Serra de Na Burguesa

The mountain's name of Serra de Portopí predates the name Serra de Na Burguesa. Serra de Portopí gained historical significance in 1229 when King James I of Aragon crossed it with his troops, and regained Palma for Spain from the occupying Moors. In present day, Portopí refers to a neighborhood located in the district west of Palma de Mallorca. The later name, Serra de Na Burguesa, honors Francesc Burgués, the Solicitor-General of the Spanish Crown, who, from the early sixteenth century, owned the Bendinat farm at the foot of the mountain. Bendinat is now a residential zone in Calvià.

== Geography ==
The mountain's average height is approximately 400 m (1,300 ft) above sea level, characterized by a low range of hills and steep-sided valleys. Its highest peaks are Puig den Bou at 503 m (1,650 ft), and Puig Gros de Bendinat at 486 m (1,594 ft), Subsequent to fires on Na Burguesa, a fire tower was built on the 432 m (1,417 ft) Es Pi de ses Creus. Fire tracks now traverse the entire crest of Na Burguesa. There are numerous cave systems on Na Burguesa, and important archaeological discoveries have been made in the caves.

Mirador de n'Alzamora is a natural terrace on Na Burguesa. Until the early twentieth century, summer grazing herds could be found in the Coll dels Pastors 443 m (1,453 ft), the mountain's central highlands. High levels of chlorides have been found in some of the mountain's aquifers.

== Fauna and flora ==
It is characterized by a significant mass of pine trees and Mediterranean maquis. In addition, there are oaks, strawberry trees, roses, wild gladiola, and flowering shrubs. There are lizards, butterflies and insects.

== Tourism ==
Na Burguesa is popular amongst tourists for its walking and mountain biking trails.
