= Puig de sa Morisca Archaeological Park =

Archaeological site

Coordinates: 39.5074°N 2.4811°E

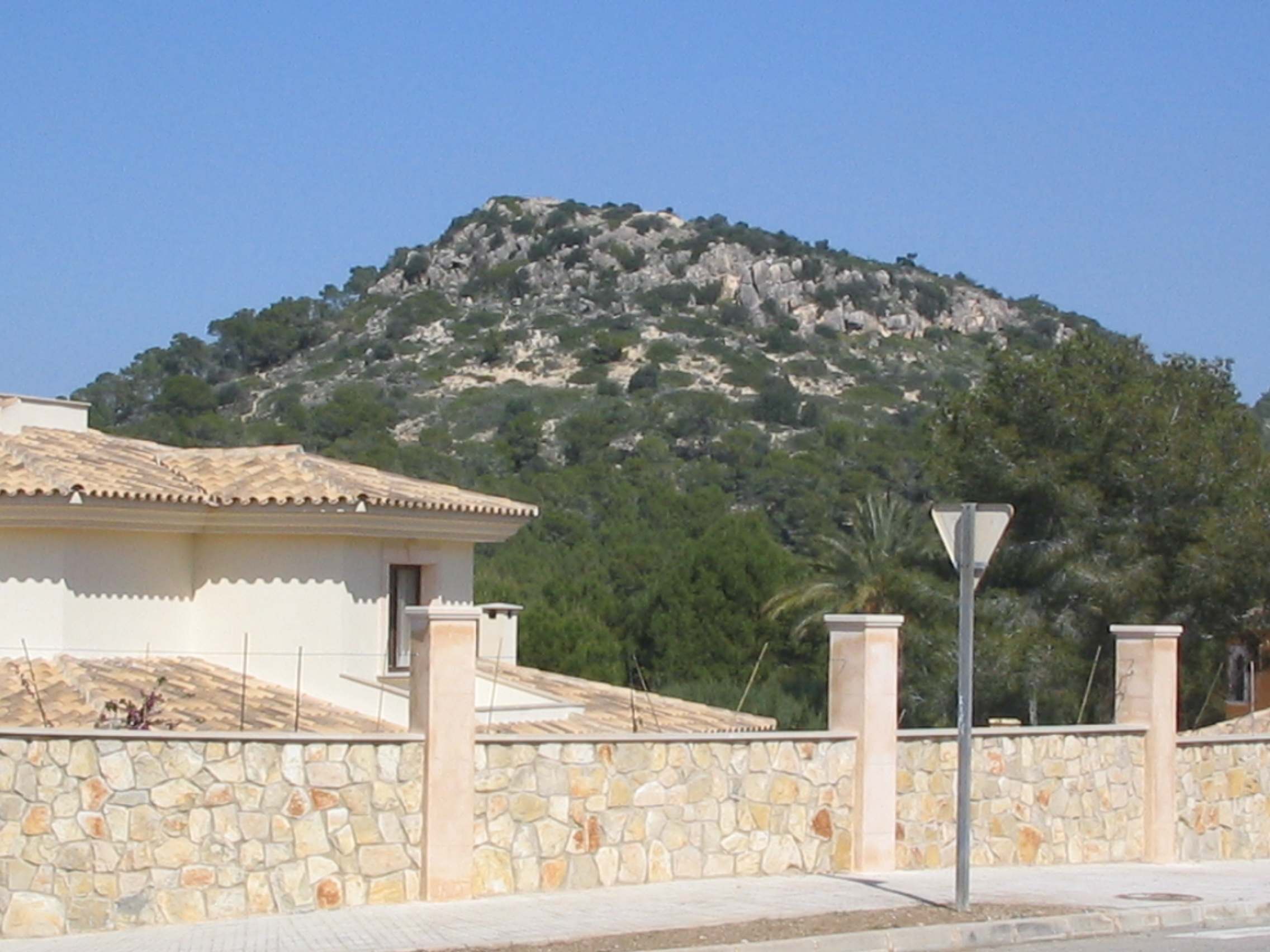
Archaeologic mound in Puig de sa Morisca Archaeological Park, Nova Santa Ponsa, Mallorca, Spain.

The Puig de sa Morisca Archaeological Park is located in Santa Ponsa in the municipality of Calvià on the island of Majorca, part of the Spanish autonomous community of the Balearic Islands. Puig de sa Morisca (translation: "Moorish Peak") is a hill, preserved in 2002 as an archaeological park. The park is 35 hectares (85 acres) in size and open to the public. The park contains more than 15 sites and nine architectural elements that are ethnologically interesting. One of these sites, the Son Ferrer tomb, was excavated from 2000 through 2009, a joint project of the University of the Balearic Islands, University of Barcelona, and University of Valencia. In addition, the site features Balearic flora found within a 10 km (6.2 mi) radius.
