= Bendinat =

Seaside village on the island of Majorca

- Seaside village
- Location within Balearic Islands
- Coordinates: 39°32′06″N 2°34′44″E
- Country: Spain
- Autonomous community: Balearic Islands
- Province: Balearic Islands
- Municipality: Calvià

Population
  - Total: 521
- Time zone: UTC+1 (CET)

Bendinat is a seaside village in the municipality of Calvià on the west coast of the island of Majorca, part of the Spanish autonomous community of the Balearic Islands. It is located at the foot of the Serra de Na Burguesa. Much of Bendinat is a residential area, and it is situated next to the town of Portals Nous. Its major thoroughfare is the county road C-719. The population is approximately 521.

There are two main theories surrounding Bendinat's naming origin. An ethnological one is that after the 12 September 1229 battle for the conquest of Majorca, King James of Aragon, who was famished, came upon a tent with one of his lieutenants where a meal was being prepared. The host for that meal was Oliver de Termes, a Frenchman of Roussillon. After eating to their satisfaction, the king declared Ben dinat (Catalan: "well dined"). The other naming theory is geographical in context as in the 13th century, an old Islamic farmhouse in the area was named Bendinex.

== History ==
Historically, the area is notable as the place where King James camped in 1229 after a bloody battle against the Moors.

From the early sixteenth century, Francesc Burgués, the Solicitor-General of the Spanish Crown owned the Bendinat farm which is now the Bendinat residential zone. In 1590 event, Burgués married Elizabeth who had been the spouse of Bernat de Boixadors of Barcelona. In the seventeenth century, the estates passed from Burgués to Jerònim de Sales i de Verí who in 1666, won the lawsuit of Boixadors-Pacs along with the Burgués inheritance. The farmland held important agricultural production value, but only peasant houses and outbuildings stood on the property. The estate passed to Caro, Marquis de la Romana, when Pere Caro i Sales inherited it through his mother Dionísia de Sales i Boixadors. The property's status was reviewed in 1850 by the Spanish writer and Majorcan chronicler, Joaquín María Bover i Roselló.

The architect and town planner François Spoerry (1912 -1999) developed the community of Bendinat.

== Tourist attractions ==
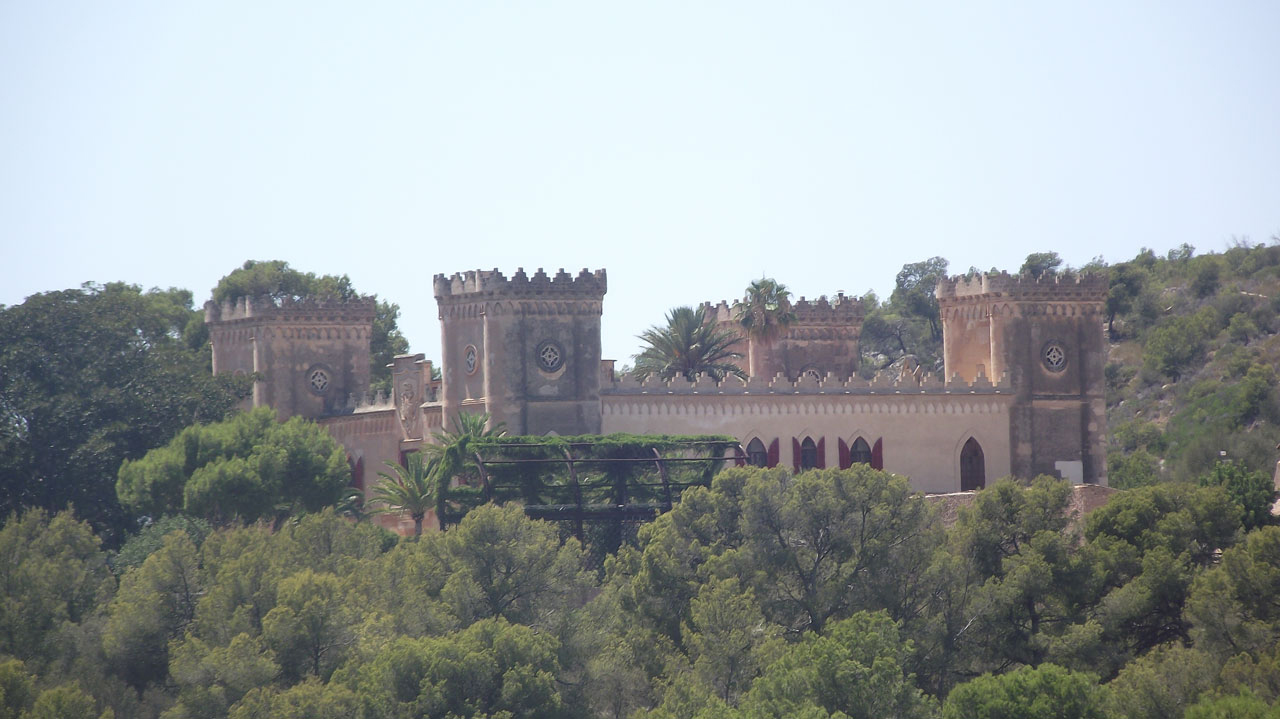
Castell de Bendinat

Bendinat Castle was the idea of Pedro Caro, 3rd Marquis of la Romana. The work began after 1855, and was finished in 1867. It was built in 19th century Central European Gothic architecture style. The 2,800-acre (11 km^{2}) estate was sold by the Marquis of la Romana in 1876 to Joana-Adelaida Dameto. It was later owned by the Count of Montenegro. While tourists can see the castle from a distance, it is privately owned and unavailable for tours.

Royal Bendinat Golf Club ("Real Golf de Bendinat") opened in 1986 and was expanded a decade later. The honorary president of the exclusive golf club is King Juan Carlos of Spain.

Cala Bendinat is a 50 m (160 ft) long and 20 m (66 ft) beach which is surrounded by a pine grove and is reachable from the residential area by the street Calvo Sotelo.
