= Calvià Vila =

- Calvià Vila shown within Majorca
- Coordinates: 39°33′50.33″N 2°30′16.31″E
- Sovereign state: Spain
- Autonomous community: Balearic Islands
- Province: Balearic Islands
- Island: Majorca
- Comarca: Serra de Tramuntana
- Municipality: Calvià

Population (2009)
  - Total: 2,434
- Postal code: 07184
- Dialling code: 971

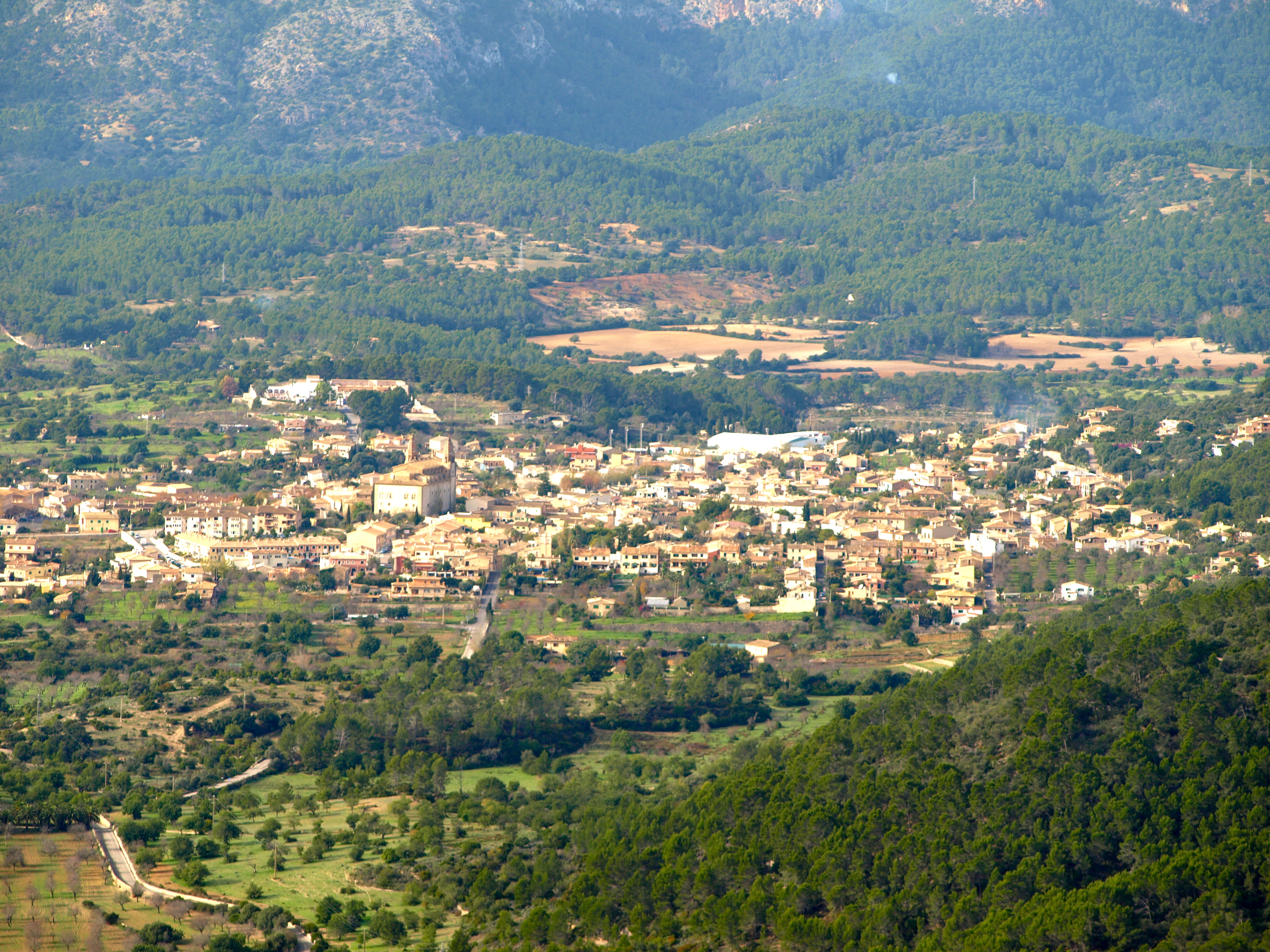
Calvià as seen from Mirador de n'Alçamora point

Calvià Vila is a town in the municipality of Calvià on the Spanish island of Majorca, which is also part of the autonomous community of the Balearic Islands.

The town's population is 2,434 as of 2009 and it is also the seat of the municipal corporation in Calvià.
