= Calvià =

Spanish island

- Municipality
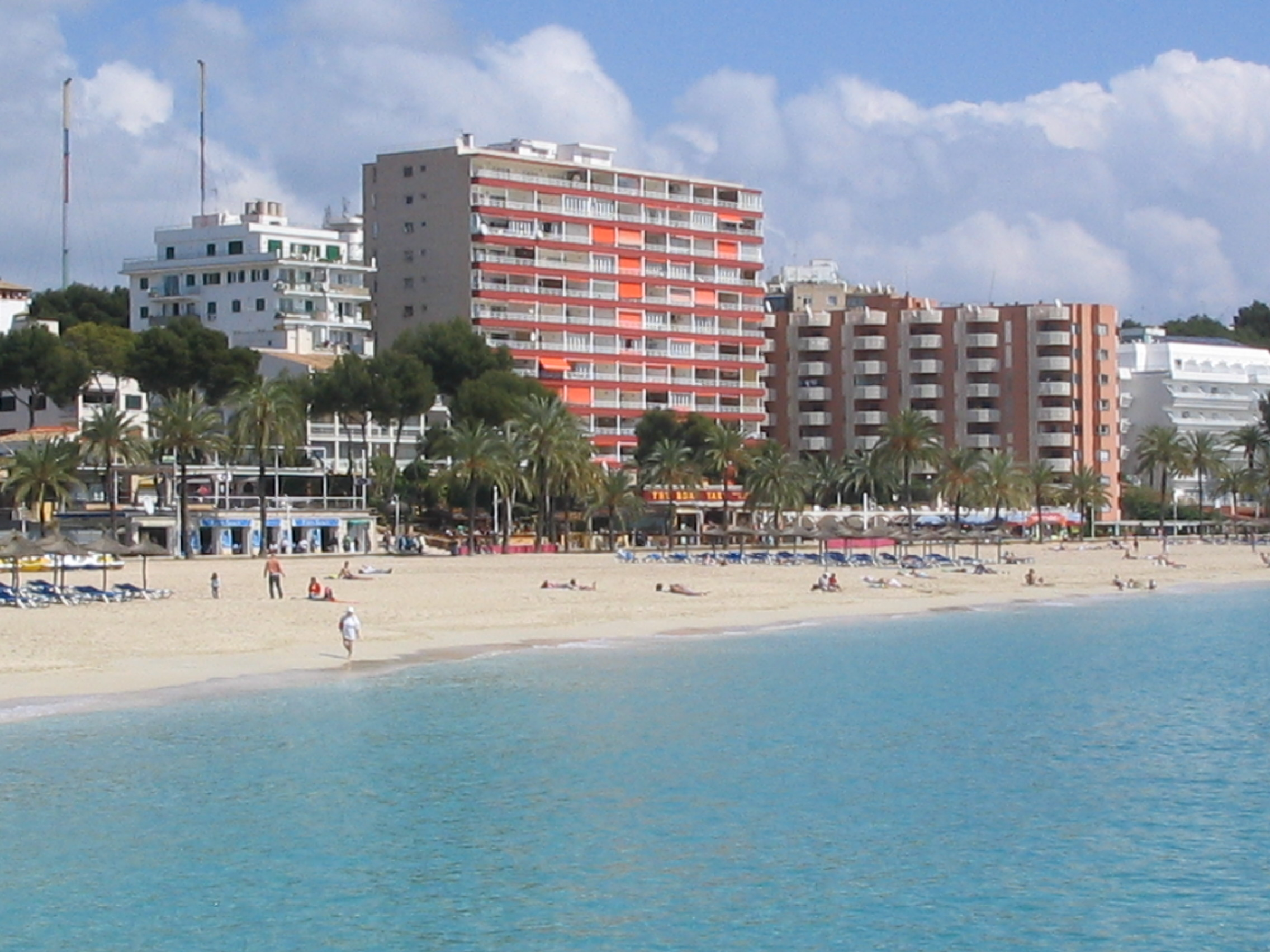
- Magaluf

- Coat of arms

- Calvià shown within Mallorca

- Location within Mallorca Location within Balearic Islands Location within Spain
- Coordinates: 39°34′N 2°31′E
- Sovereign state: Spain
- Autonomous community: Balearic Islands
- Province: Balearic Islands
- Island: Mallorca
- Comarca: Serra de Tramuntana
- Administrative HQ: Calvià Vila

Government
  - Type: Municipal corporation
  - Body: Ajuntament de Calvià
  - Mayor: Alfonso Rodríguez Badal (PSIB-PSOE)

Area
  - Total: 145.02 km^{2} (55.99 sq mi)
- Elevation: 154 m (505 ft)

Population (2025-01-01)
  - Total: 53,793
  - Density: 370.94/km^{2} (960.72/sq mi)
- Time zone: UTC+1 (Central European Time)
  - Summer (DST): UTC+2 (Central European Summer Time)
- Website: www.calvia.com

Calvià (Balearic Catalan: [kəlviˈa]) is a municipality and resort town on the island of Mallorca, part of the Spanish autonomous community of the Balearic Islands. It is located in the southwestern part of the island of Mallorca, between the Serra de Tramuntana and the Serra de Na Burguesa. The municipal seat is the town of Calvià Vila.

Calvià has an approximate area of 145 km^{2} (56 sq mi). It is bordered on the north by the municipalities of Puigpunyent and Estellencs, Palma de Mallorca, the island's capital to the east, Andratx to the west and to the south by the Mediterranean Sea.

According to the 2008 census, the municipality had a population of 50,777 inhabitants, of whom 18,046 were foreigners. Today, it is the second most populated area of the entire archipelago Balearic after Palma, and also an area that has the largest number of tourists in the islands. Its population is scattered around the different urban centers created as a result of tourism development and twentieth century urbanization.

The historical epic that marked the most important local culture and traditions regarding the rest of Mallorca is the landing in Santa Ponça on 10 September 1229 of King James I of Aragon, and the subsequent conquering of Muslims who had invaded in the year 903. Since 1248, Calvià has had its own parochial church, Sante Ihoannes Caviano. Despite the popularity and use of the official shield locally, the municipality has no flag.

== Toponymy ==
The origin of the place name is subject to conjecture but is believed to be from the patronymic Latin calvianum, derived from the personal name of Calvius. According to the philologist Antoni Maria Alcover, it comes from the word Caluus, meaning "burn" or "be hot", testament to the arid land that contains no vegetation. The official name is Calvià (with a grave accent), but in Castilian, Calviá (with an acute accent) is used.

Officially, the adjective to refer to inhabitants of Calvià is calvianenc or calvianenca. However, more widespread use in both Catalan and in its Castilian translation is calvianer / calvianera. This is used by agencies such as the Institut Calvianer d'Esports del Ajuntament de Calvià and the Asociación Calvianera.

== Heraldry ==
The municipality does not have a flag but has a distinctive coat of arms, defined as an azure blue shield with a paschal lamb holding a flag with a St George's Cross, capped by a crown. The coat of arms was approved on 25 June 1976 emblazoned with De azur y el cordero de plata que empuña en su mano derecha una bandera de aquel metal, cargada con cruz de gules. Al timbre corona real, cerrada..

== History ==
=== Ancient era ===
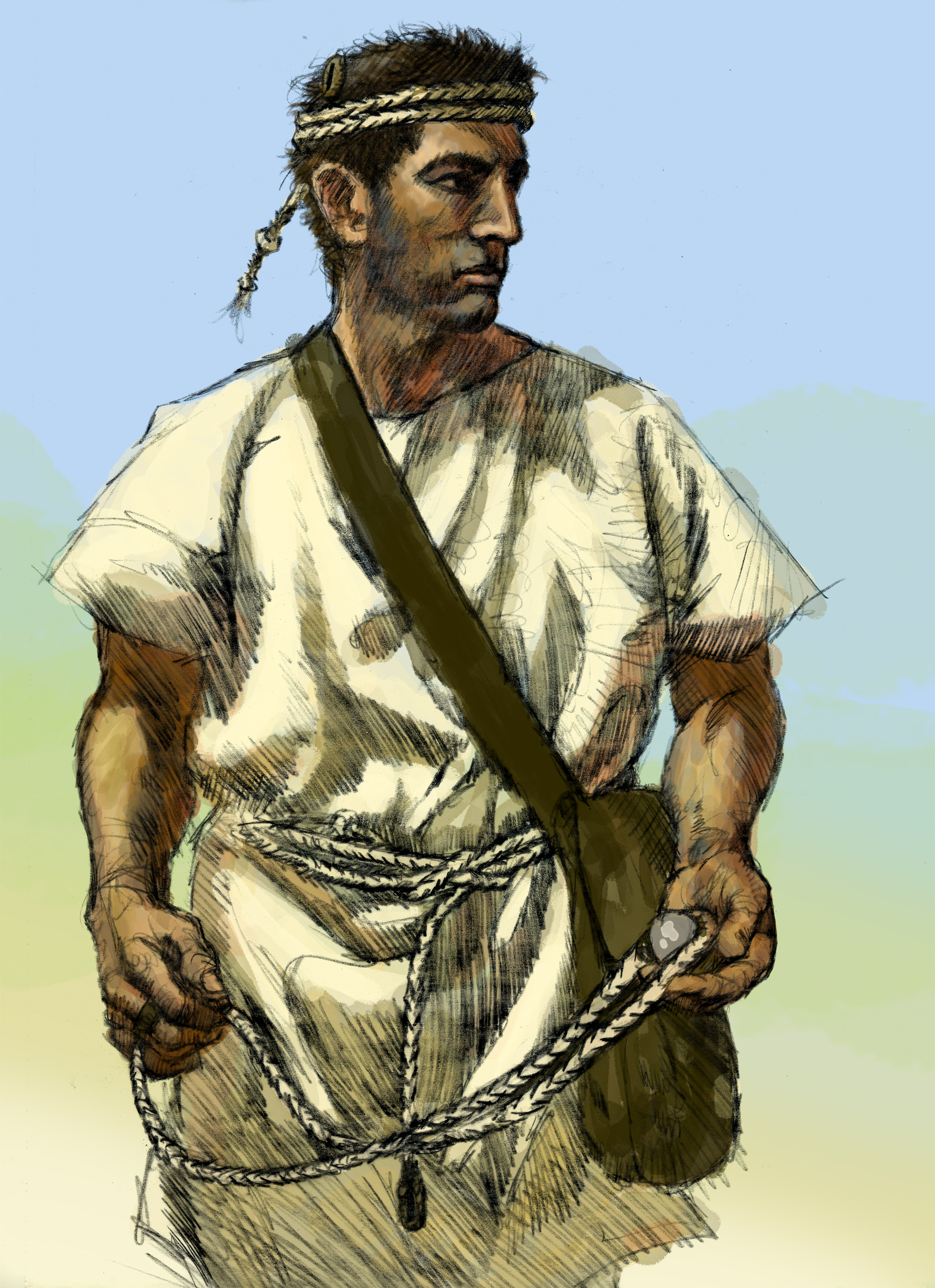
The Balearic slingers were among the first people to inhabit and colonize the Balearic Islands.

Calvià first appears in history as a village 2,000 years BCE, although the area was first populated in the Neolithic Era. Later, sailors coming from the east stopped in the Balearics on their way to the Iberian Peninsula, where they sought metals. They came from Italy, from other Mediterranean islands, and from the Near East, and constructed small settlements along the coast. Historians call this period the "Cave Culture", because caves were frequently used as habitations and burial areas. Some vestiges of this area have been catalogued in an archaeological excavation called the Puig de sa Morisca Archaeological Park, which conserves remains of what was a talaiot 9 metres (30 ft) in diameter. It is located on a small mountainous elevation in Calvià's Santa Ponsa district.

The Roman era lasted from 123 BCE until the 4th century CE, but left no significant vestiges. Among the few archaeological remnants of this era are the remains of a Roman villa in Santa Ponça known as Sa Mesquida, which has an oven that was used to make ceramics, the horse-shoe shaped Naveta Alemany and the Turó de Ses Abelles.

In 425, the area was invaded by the Vandals, who ended up settling. Lack of remains or written record means little is known about this area other than the decline that began with the destruction of Pollença. The Byzantine general Flavius Belisarius ordered the conquest of the archipelago in 534, bringing an end to this era.

The first Muslim arrivals were in 707. They quickly ended the Byzantine domination and established their own hegemony. Until 903, the island was part of the Umayyad Caliphate.

=== Middle Ages ===
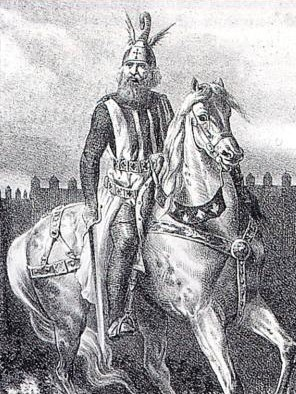
James I of Aragon, "the Conqueror".

In 903, the Almoravid general Isam al-Jawlani conquered the island on behalf of Abdullah ibn Muhammad al-Umawi, Emir of Córdoba. The city of Palma passed from the Almoravids to the Almohads, eventually becoming part of one of the taifas. Calviá was part of the administrative division Juz' d' Ahwaz al-Madina.

In 1229, after the Conquest of Mallorca by King James I of Aragon, colonists brought the Catalan language and culture, which survive to the present time. In the division of the conquered territory, Calvià formed part of the medietas magnatum that the king granted to nobles Guillermo II de Montcada, Hugo de Ampurias, Nuño Sánchez and Berenguer de Palou, all of whom had participated in the conquest. Calvià in particular was granted to Berenguer de Palou, Bishop of Barcelona, becoming part of the Barony of the Bishops of Barcelona. There were many tensions among the conquering nobles who were granted various feudal rights; these were resolved through a pariatge or condominium under which feudal rights were shared. Therefore, the surroundings of the municipality are also known as the comarca of the Pariatge. Ultimately, though, the rights accrued to the Bishopric, which held them until 1834 when the Spanish Church lost many of its feudal properties. The conquerors came, in various proportions from a variety of places. Thus, and according to the Llibre del Repartiment ("Book of Distribution"), the conquered lands were distributed among people from Catalonia (39.71%), Occitania (24.26%), Italy (16.19%), Aragon (7.35%), Navarra (5.88%), France (4.42%), Castile (1.47%) and Flanders (0.73%). Owing to the extermination or expulsion of the greater part of the prior local populace, there were not enough laborers to cultivate the land. In 1230 a set of privileges called the Franquezas de Mallorca were granted in order to attract new settlers to cultivate the countryside. Most of these new settlers of Mallorca came from Catalonia, more specifically the northeast and, within the east, from Ampurdán. As a result, the dialect spoken today (Mallorquí) is an eastern Catalan dialect.

Since 1248, Calvià has had its own parish church, Sante Ihoannes Caviano, dedicated to Saint John the Baptist. In 1285, during the reign of James II of Aragon, second son of James I, it gained the status of a villa. This meant it would have its own mayor, named by the king or governor. The mayor would execute orders from higher levels of government and would also maintain public order and administer justice. Nonetheless, he did not have the power to administer the villa, which fell within the purview of the jurados de prohombre, (a medieval office that was essentially a district overseer).

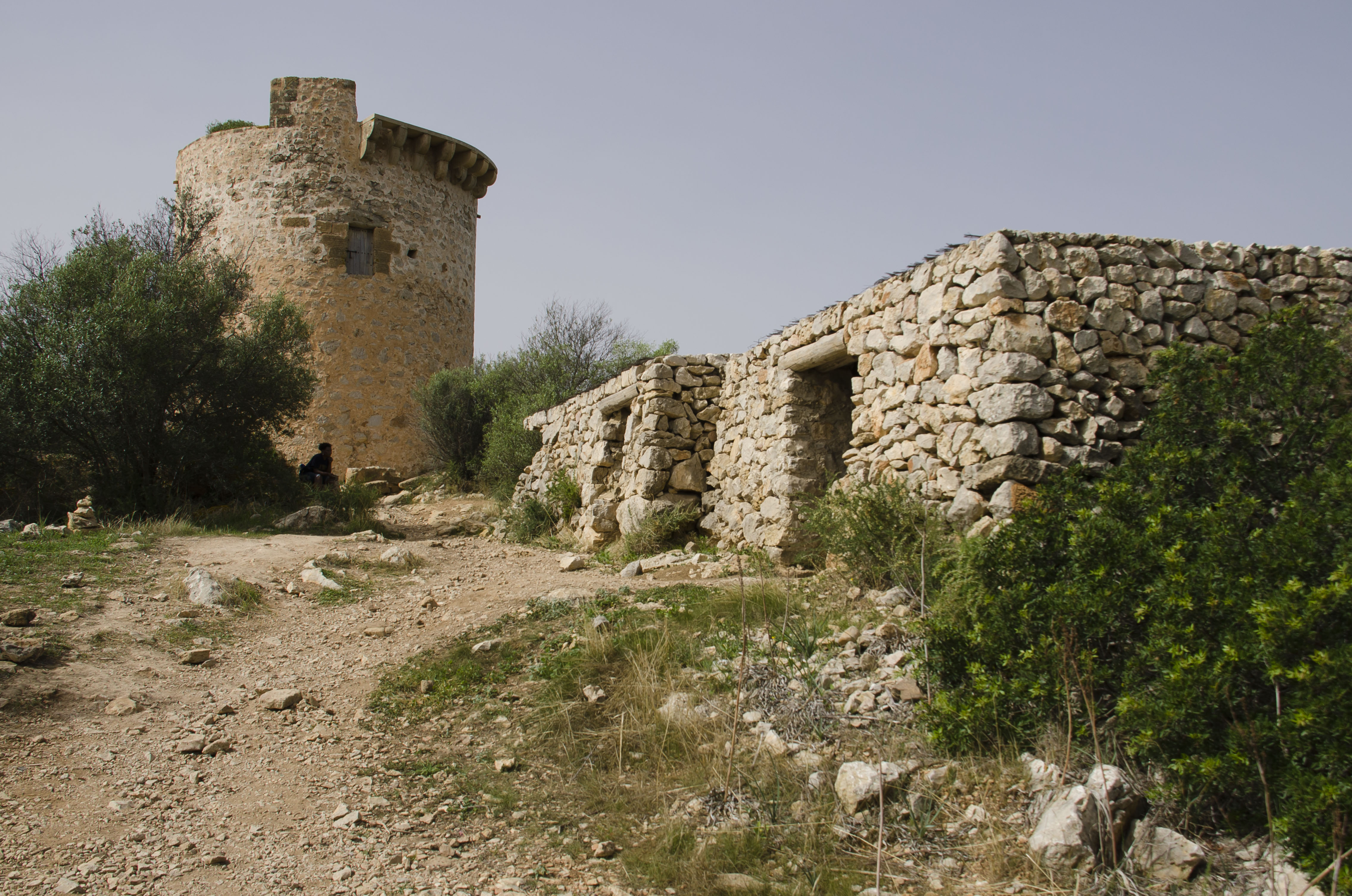
Torre del Cap Andritxol, near Peguera

In the Middle Ages, various watchtowers were built to defend against Mediterranean piracy.

To sustain the parish and its clerics, the king and the tenured landowners of the jurisdiction ceded one fourth of the diezmos paid to them by those who cultivated the land. This was, in turn, divided into four parts, three of which were granted to the rector of the parish and the fourth to the parish priest or vicar.

James II of Majorca reigned over the islands for more than two decades and made great efforts to guarantee the viability of his kingdom. He undertook a broad policy of agrarian colonization, with the creation of rural nuclei; increased the royal revenue; favored the creation of consulates in North Africa and in the kingdom of Granada; created a new monetary system for the kingdom; promoted the creation of textile industries; increased royal power relative to that of the nobility and Church; and promoted the construction of palaces and castles such as the Royal Palace of La Almudaina, the La Seu Cathedral in Palma, and the Bellver Castle. The opening of the trials of the Knights Templar and the later suppression of the order allowed the Crown to take over their revenues in the islands.

The health system consisted mainly of physicians of Jewish origins, so-called Xuetas, descendants of Mallorcan Jews who had converted to Christianity, but continued to form a largely endogamous community. The nearest hospital to Calvià was in Sant Elm, founded in 1303 by Jaime II. Fundamentally it was dedicated to merchants and sailors of the ships that were heading from Palma to Barcelona. They also used it as a refuge in bad weather.

=== Modern era ===
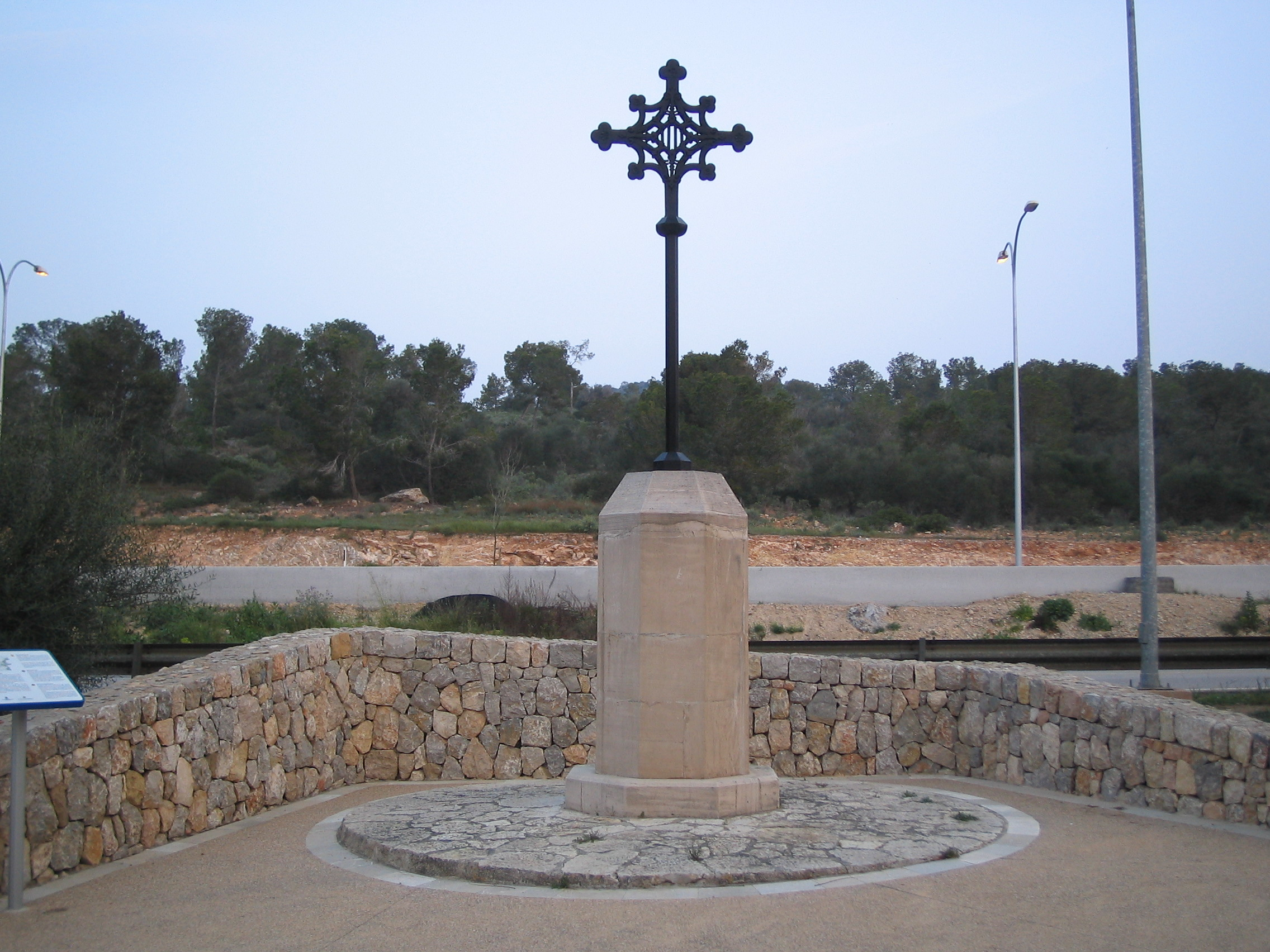
Monument at the burial place of William II of Béarn, today part of the Paseo Calviá network. near Palma Nova.

From the 13th century to the mid-20th century, the region was almost entirely agricultural. The first area to be cultivated was along the banks of the Bay of Santa Ponça; at the time, the area was referred to as the terme de Santa Ponça; the expression terme de Calvià came far later. Despite the long coast, people turned their backs to the sea, deriving their living from the dry and none-too-fertile land.

Agriculture was based on latifundia—large estates—from the 14th century into the 20th. Most of the land was owned by a small number of nobles. In 1863, continuing a longstanding pattern 66.3% of the land was owned by four proprietors. At a slightly earlier date, Pedro Caro, 3rd Marquis of la Romana owned 2,516 hectares (6,220 acres), including all of Bendinat, Peguera, as well as an additional 990 hectares (2,400 acres) in the municipality of Andratx. The Marquis of Bellpuig owned 4,376 hectares (10,810 acres) in Santa Ponça, the largest latifundium in Mallorca at the beginning of the 19th century. On the other hand, there was a small group of peasants known as els roters, to whom the nobility had ceded land near the sea. These roters cultivated cereals, and lived in miserable conditions.

In the 16th century, Calvià itself largely escaped the plague that decimated the population elsewhere, although other nearby municipalities such as Andratx suffered the scourge of the epidemic. Still, the population suffered other epidemics associated with the era and their way of life, particularly malaria which only a few escaped, such as the priest or the few artisans who did not work in Ses Rotes. The daily wage of a farm laborer was between four and six sous (a dozen eggs cost one-and-a-half sous). In that era there were also Arab slaves, although not in the maritime zones, where they were seen as liable to escape or to collaborate with pirates. In the 18th century a severe drought and bad cereal harvest led to a long period of famine. On 28 November 1715, Philip V of Spain abolished the fueros and privileges of the Balearics, as the Nueva Planta decrees extended the administrative organization of the Kingdom of Castile, prohibited the Catalan language, and required the use of Castilian Spanish in the islands. In 1748 the wretchedness of the municipality had become so severe that chronicler Pere Xamena Fiol described it as follows:

Wheat became so expensive that one paid 25 Sous per barchilla (unit to measure cereals, approximately 13.75 litres or 14.53 US quarts), and fortunate was he who could find some. Hunger reached the point where each house got no more than two doblers of bread, even if the family was large, and they gave permission to eat meat during Lent, and many people who didn't have the money to buy meat ate herbs, and they told me that some people had gone more than a fortnight eating only boiled herbs, and the poor people and workers were so thin that they couldn't work for lack of food.

The economic system rooted in latifundia underlay the Caciquism that made moot the theoretically democratic Spanish constitutions the second half of the 19th century and the early 20th century. In Restoration Spain the power of the dominant classes remained intact. Both major political parties of the time, the Conservative Party led by Canovas del Castillo and the Liberal Party led by Sagasta relied on a system where day laborers and smallholders beholden to the caciques and voted accordingly, producing an orderly alternation of the two parties in power, the turno pacífico. In the late 19th century, hunger and poverty sparked emigration to the Americas, especially to Cuba and Argentina, as well as to France and Algeria.

Calvià at that time lacked industrial establishments, except for the manufacturing of cement and plaster. The latifundia system was largely an impoverished agrarian autarky. In 1923 the Federació Obrera Calvianera ("Federation of Calvian Workers") was founded as a member of the socialist Unión General de Trabajadores, followed by the Unió Agrària de Calvià (Calvian Agrarian Union) and La Fraternal. On 30 September 1923, Spain's socialist party, the Spanish Socialist Workers' Party, inaugurated a Casa del pueblo (a cultural and service center), which represented an investment of half a million Spanish pesetas. The labor movement and socialism played an important part in politics during the Second Spanish Republic, but were squashed during the Spanish Civil War.

=== Contemporary era ===
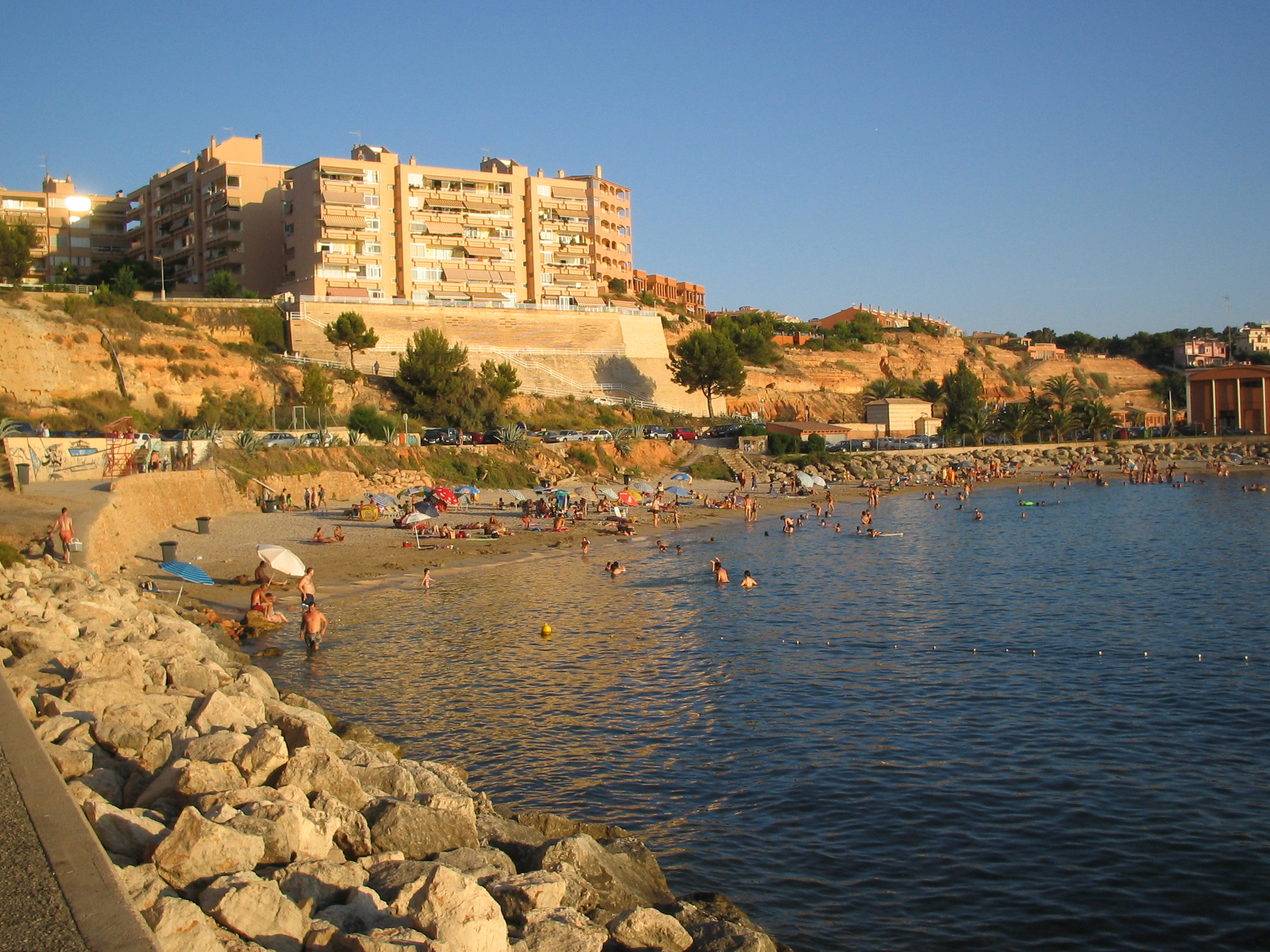
Cala El Toro beach. The small beach was constructed artificially, although there had been a natural beach where the containment rocks now are. This change was made because during the strong winter storms the sea would destroy the highway leading to a small resort.

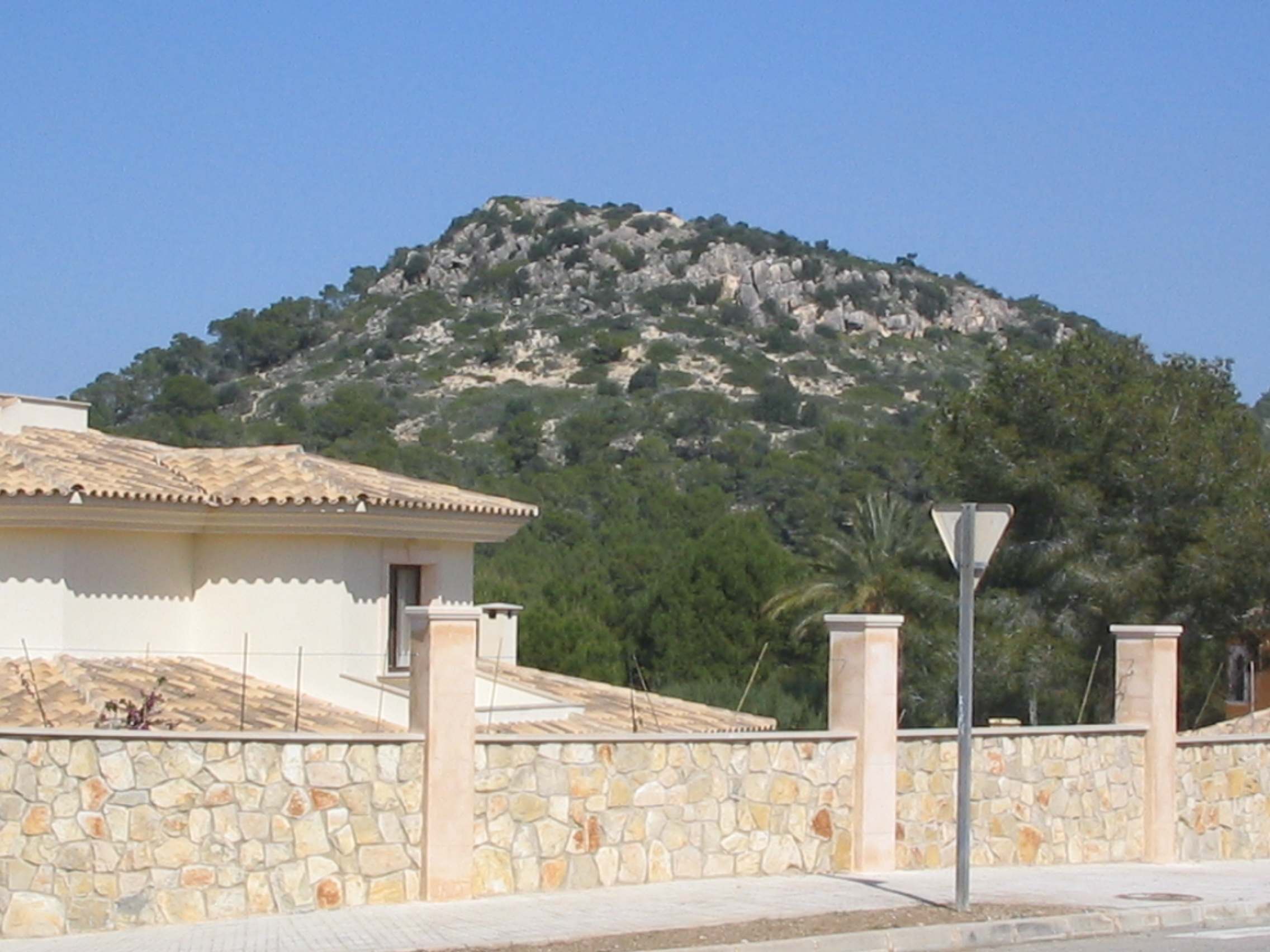
View of the hillock that is the site of the Puig de sa Morisca Archaeological Park in Nova Santa Ponsa. The façade of the chalet uses a technique of marjada—a type of terraced construction—typical of Mallorcan houses.

The first seed of the modern tourism-based economy came when steamboat service from Barcelona to Palma began in 1838. This made travel to Mallorca easier for travelers from the Iberian peninsula and beyond. Some came to visit the municipality's coves and beaches. At this time Mallorca drew visitors who were motivated by the desire for adventure, an interest in exploring a different world and society than the one they knew, but also those who came to the island for therapeutic reasons. Among this last group was the composer Frédéric Chopin. Works published by travelers, learned people, artists and geographers increasingly promoted Mallorca as a preferred destination.

In 1962, Calvià had four butcher shops, three bakeries, a dairy, ten grocery shops, three cafés, two haberdashers, five carpenter's shops, two blacksmiths, a bicycle shop, and one bus line. Its scant industry consisted of five master masons, various ventures in shipping and transport, two cement and plaster factories, a trader in nuts and dried fruit, a machine for shucking almonds, a flour mill, a carob crusher, a wood dealer, and an oil press.

The first urban nuclei in the municipality began development in 1920, built on failed agricultural land sold well below its potential value. By 1960, changes in ownership had been so fundamental as to facilitate immediate development. Three quarters of the coast was rapidly developed, including all of the most desirable areas. Through their real estate affiliates, some of the last large landowners, such as Miguel Nigorra Oliver, president of the Banco de Crédito Balear, came to control nearly all of the development of Santa Ponsa. By 1986, the municipality had 10,000 of the dwellings locally known as chalés ("chalets").

On 30 July 2009, around two in the afternoon, the Palmanova neighborhood suffered a bombing attack by ETA. Two members of the Civil Guard were killed by a bomb placed under a patrol car outside their barracks; a second similar bomb was discovered and successfully defused.

== Geography ==
=== Location ===
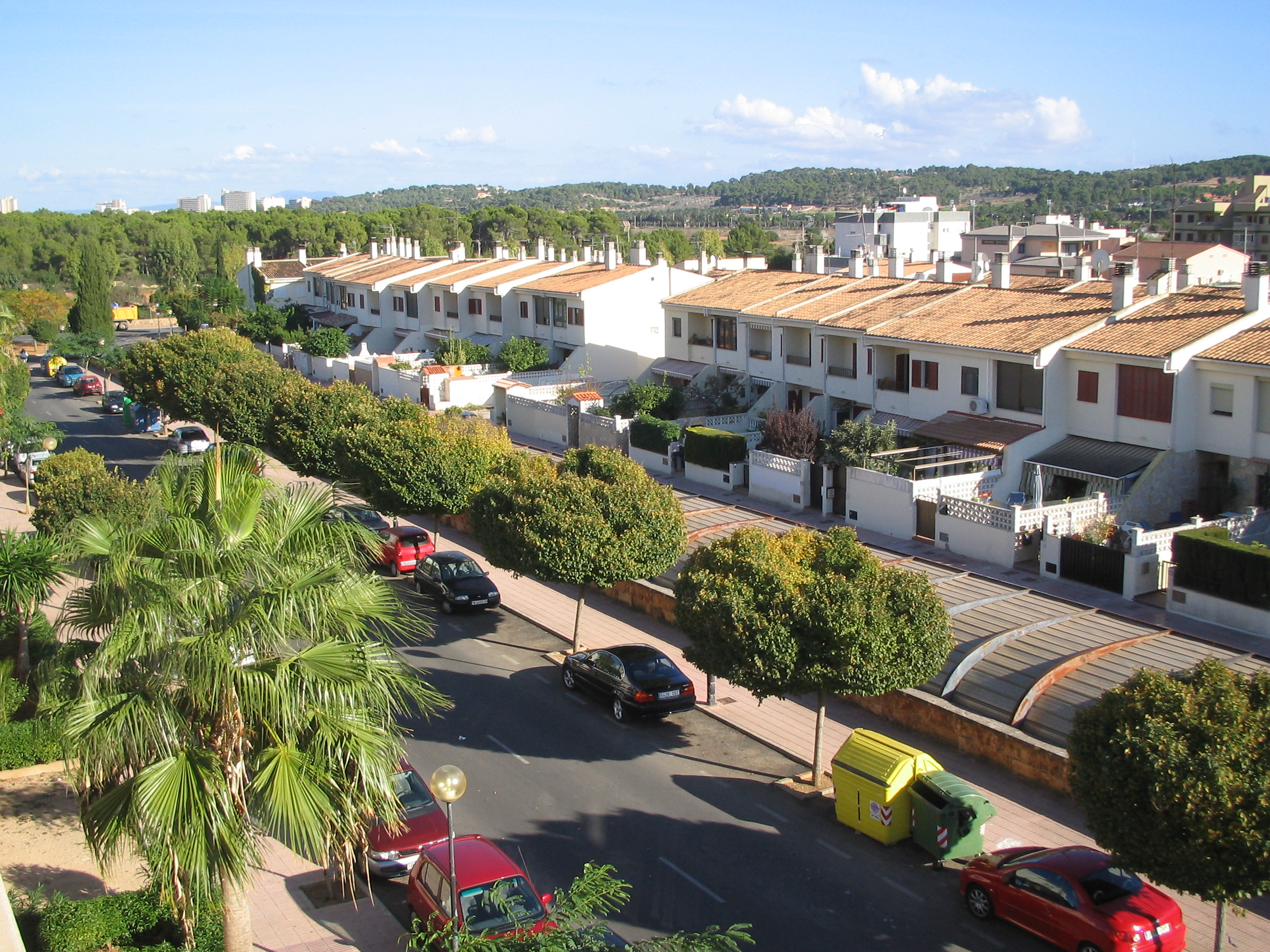
Chalets of Son Ferrer

Calvià is located in the western part of the island of Mallorca, next to the Sierra de Tramontana, the main mountain of the Balearic Islands, and extends to the Sierra de Na Burguesa, a mountain located in Calvia. Calvià has an area of about 145.02 km ^{2}. Of a total of 14,372 hectares, 81% is protected rural land, 18% is developed urban land and 1% are soils with low protection. It is bordered on the north by the municipality of Puigpunyent and Estellencs, Palma de Mallorca (Palma), the island's capital to the east, Andratx to the west and to the south by the Mediterranean Sea.

The highest point of the municipality is the Puig de Galatzó at 1,026 m (3,366 ft) above sea level. The second is 926 metres above sea level, the Mola del Esclop, an area which consists of many valleys and ravines, between the hills of Puig Batiat and Penya Blanca.

The peninsula on which the municipality is located is marked by the presence of wetlands to the east and west, at Magaluf, Palmanova and Santa Ponça, that lead to a narrowing similar to an isthmus to the north.

The urban area has expanded around its coastline, converting into several villages on the main beaches. The coast extends from Cape Andritxol, until the area of Cas Català Ses Illetas. It is 54 km (34 mi) long and very rocky, but still has 34 beaches and coves. There is 35.5 kilometres of rocky shores, 4.5 kilometres of sandy beaches, 10 islets and 7,000 hectares of coast, with a maximum depth of 5 m (16 ft). Islets include El Sec, Sa Porrassa, D'en Sales, Ses Illetes, D'estenedor and Sa Caleta. The most important though, ecologically, are the Malgrats and El Toro, having been designated as marine reserves and a special protection area for birds.

=== Localities ===
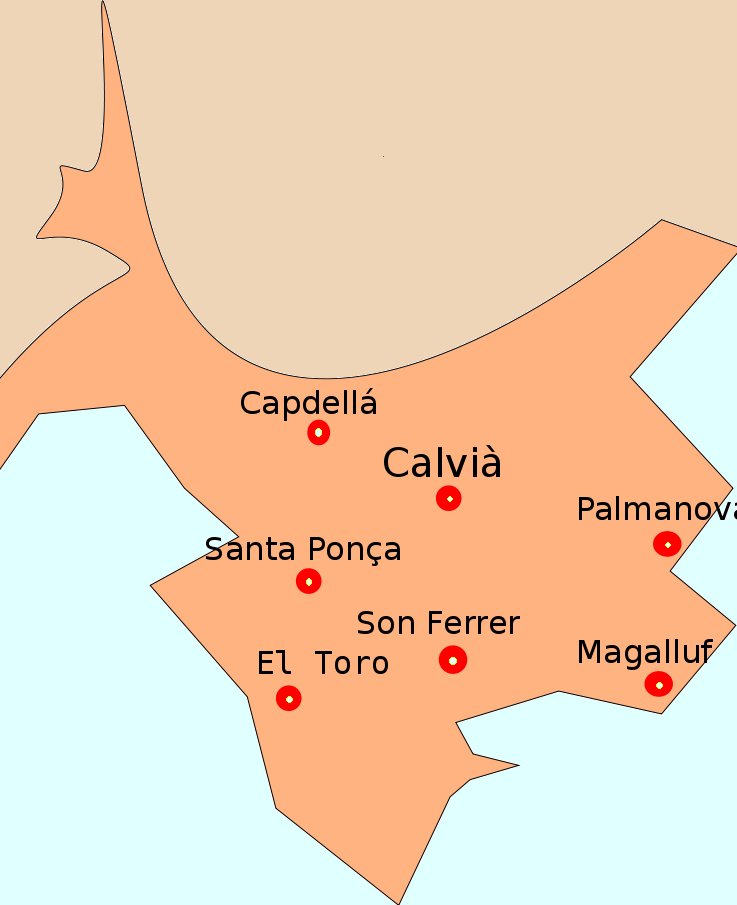
Map of Calviá

The municipality contains eighteen settlements. The most important are the resorts. Palma Nova was one of the first tourist resorts to be built on the island within the grounds of an old farm called Ses Planes and began as a project intended to build a residential type Garden City, but due to the Spanish Civil War, this idea was discarded. In 2009, it was considered one of the most important tourist areas of Mallorca. It is bounded on the west by the busy town of Magaluf which contains the largest hotel and greatest infrastructural services of the municipality to accommodate the many tourists. Another of the localities, Santa Ponsa, has historical significance as the place that James I of Aragon landed. The town of Portals Nous is also a renowned meeting point for businessmen, celebrities, high society figures and members of the Spanish Royal Family during their summer stays in the Marivent Palace. Another of its main tourist areas is Peguera, where many residents spend their summer holidays, as well as a number of German tourists. Similarly, the urbanized residential areas of El Toro, which has a marina and a small beach, and Son Ferrer, are of note.

| Settlement | Population | Coordinates |
|---|---|---|
| Calvià Vila | 2434 | 39°33′50.33″N 2°30′16.31″E |
| Es Capdellà | 1012 | 39°34′44.19″N 2°28′10.37″E |
| Peguera | 3988 | 39°32′15.47″N 2°27′1.69″E |
| Santa Ponsa | 10736 | 39°31′0.56″N 2°28′52.30″E |
| Galatzó | 1598 | 39°31′25.42″N 2°29′53.09″E |
| El Toro | 2321 | 39°29′20.73″N 2°28′51.29″E |
| Portals Vells | 32 | 39°29′44.57″N 2°28′19.36″E |
| Son Ferrer | 5666 | 39°29′41.24″N 2°30′7.24″E |
| La Porrassa | 128 | 39°30′2.21″N 2°30′59.32″E |
| Sol de Mallorca | 589 | 39°28′55.10″N 2°31′36.50″E |
| Magaluf | 3981 | 39°30′29.97″N 2°32′6.33″E |
| Palma Nova | 6906 | 39°31′14.03″N 2°32′10.34″E |
| Portals Nous | 2650 | 39°31′59.68″N 2°34′12.08″E |
| Castell de Bendinat | 521 | 39°32′0″N 2°32′10.08″E |
| Cas Català Ses Illetes | 3533 | 39°32′27.04″N 2°35′36.18″E |
| Costa de la Calma | 1623 | 39°31′30.79″N 2°28′30.12″E |
| Costa de Blanes | 2094 | 39°32′24.41″N 2°33′41.12″E |

=== Geology and relief ===
The topography is marked by the contrast between the mountains in the north and the rest of the municipality, where the features are flatter.

The main mountain range is called the Serra de Na Burguesa, situated between Son Falconer and Son Vida in Palma. It is the southernmost range of the Serra de Tramuntana. It was formerly known as Portopí or d'en Bou. It has an average height of 500 meters and is covered by large formations of Mediterranean pine forest and scrubland. The hills are composed of Triassic and Jurassic materials, mainly limestone and dolomite, with marl and gypsum present as well. The hills have a complex tectonic structure, forming a relief fold with many faults. The karst nature of the Tramuntana has led to the formation of numerous caves and sinkholes.

The rest of the municipality is relatively flat, with broad valleys filled by quaternary and tertiary materials and small hills, with Mesozoic materials surfacing occasionally. This area contains a number of cavities divided between the area of Es Coll des Pastors and around the Puig Gros de Bendinat, Son Boronat, Benatiga Nou and Valldurgent. The Puig Gros de Bendinat depression contains abundant late Jurassic and Cretaceous sediments. Its coastline is composed of calcareous materials.

=== Climate ===
Calvià has a mild Mediterranean climate with an average annual temperature of 19 °C and an average annual rainfall of 410 mm (16 in). It is influenced by two types of atmospheric circulation manifested in two distinct seasons: a hot, dry summer with little pressure gradient and occasional rainfall, as opposed to a cool, wet winter. The coldest month is January, with 15.1 / 3.5 °C and the hottest is August, with 31.0 / 18.2 °C. Rainfall averages 51 days a year and there are approximately 2,756 hours of sunshine. The average temperature in the summer is 27 °C, and 14 °C in winter. The driest month is July, at an average of 7.8 L / m^{2}, while the wettest is December with an average of 81.1 L / m^{2}. The area is sheltered from the Nordic Tramuntana wind by mountains that are over a thousand feet high.

The thermal variation of the water has a range of around 15 °C. During the winter, it drops down to about 13 °C. In the late spring, warming occurs, raising the temperature one degree each week. During the summer, a 25 cm deep water layer reaches temperatures above 25 °C.(something of a thermocline).

=== Hydrology ===
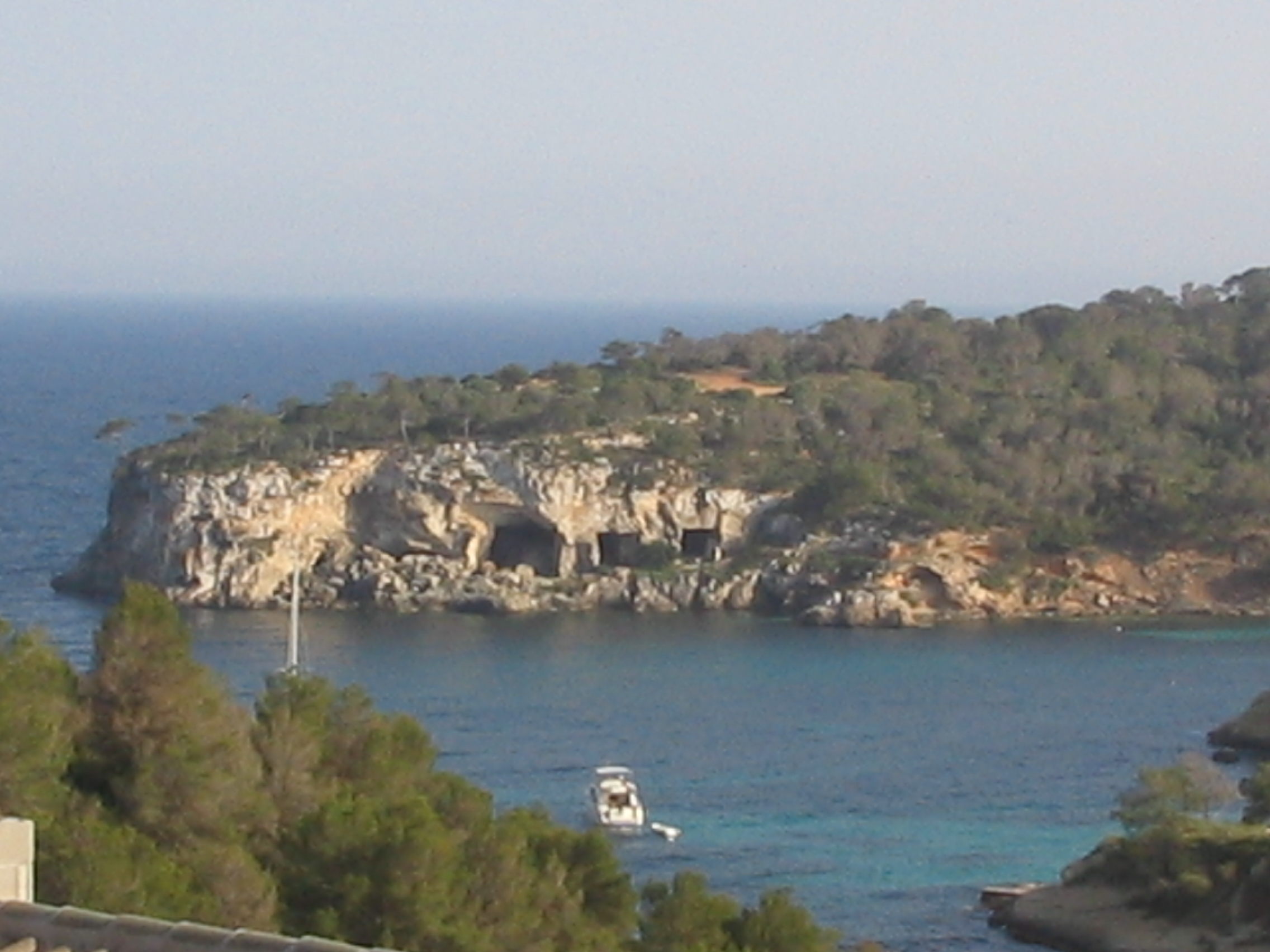
Cala (cove) de Portals Vells (in Catalan) or de Portales viejos (in Spanish), source of the stone blocks for La Seu Cathedral in Palma. On the cliffs you can see the "caves", really a single cave with three entrances. The cave is some 80 metres (260 ft) long 60 metres (200 ft) wide.

According to the Instituto Geológico y Minero de España (IGME), the area receives 4,900,000 cubic metres (6,400,000 cu yd) of rain per year, plus 100,000 cubic metres (130,000 cu yd) runoff from irrigation and 200,000 cubic metres (260,000 cu yd) infiltration of treated waste-water. 6,700,000 cubic metres (8,800,000 cu yd) is pumped annually for the water supply, but the current Balearic Hydrological Plan intends to reduce this to 4,100,000 cubic metres (5,400,000 cu yd).

==== Ravines ====
Because of the torrential rains in October and November, Mallorca has many ravines, narrow channels that bring the rainwater to the sea. Among these are the Torrente (ravine) des Gorg, which rises in Es Capdellà and enters the sea at Peguera. The Torrente Vial, rises on the outskirts of the village of Vial and runs to the Cala (cove) de Santa Ponsa; it receives the water of hundreds of smaller ravines, among which are the Barranco des Cobaix and the Barranco des Pas de la Mula. Among the longest is the Torrente de Galatzó, running 23 kilometres (14 mi) and draining a basin of 72 square kilometres (28 sq mi). It begins on the west slope of the Puig de Galatzó and reaches the sea at the Bay of Santa Ponsa (Santa Ponça).

=== Flora and fauna ===
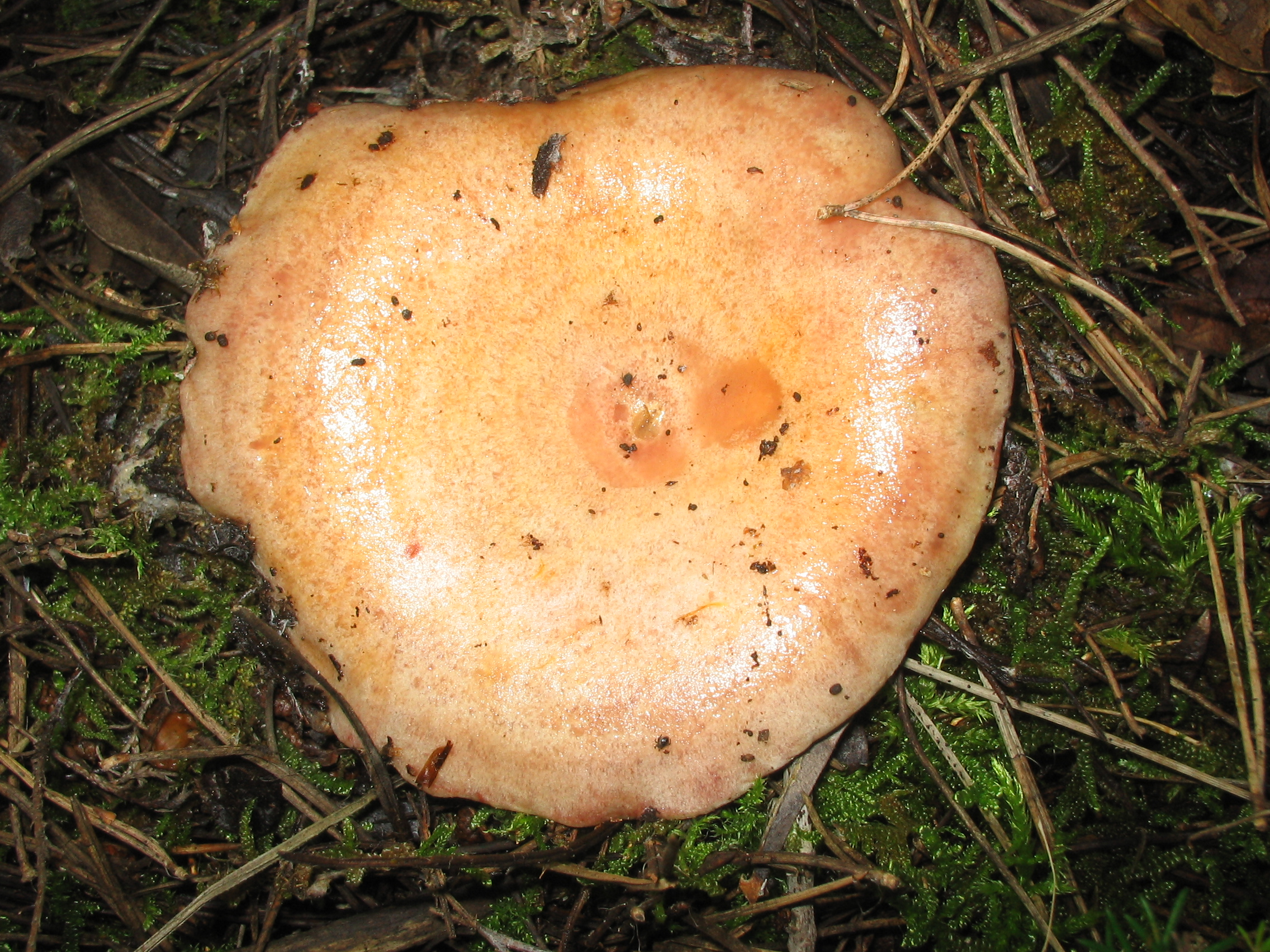
Lactarius sangifluus (esclata-sang) is a species specific to the Balearics and distinct from the common Lactarius deliciosus. It grows in the pine forests in mycorrhizic relation with the Aleppo pine (Pinus halepensis).

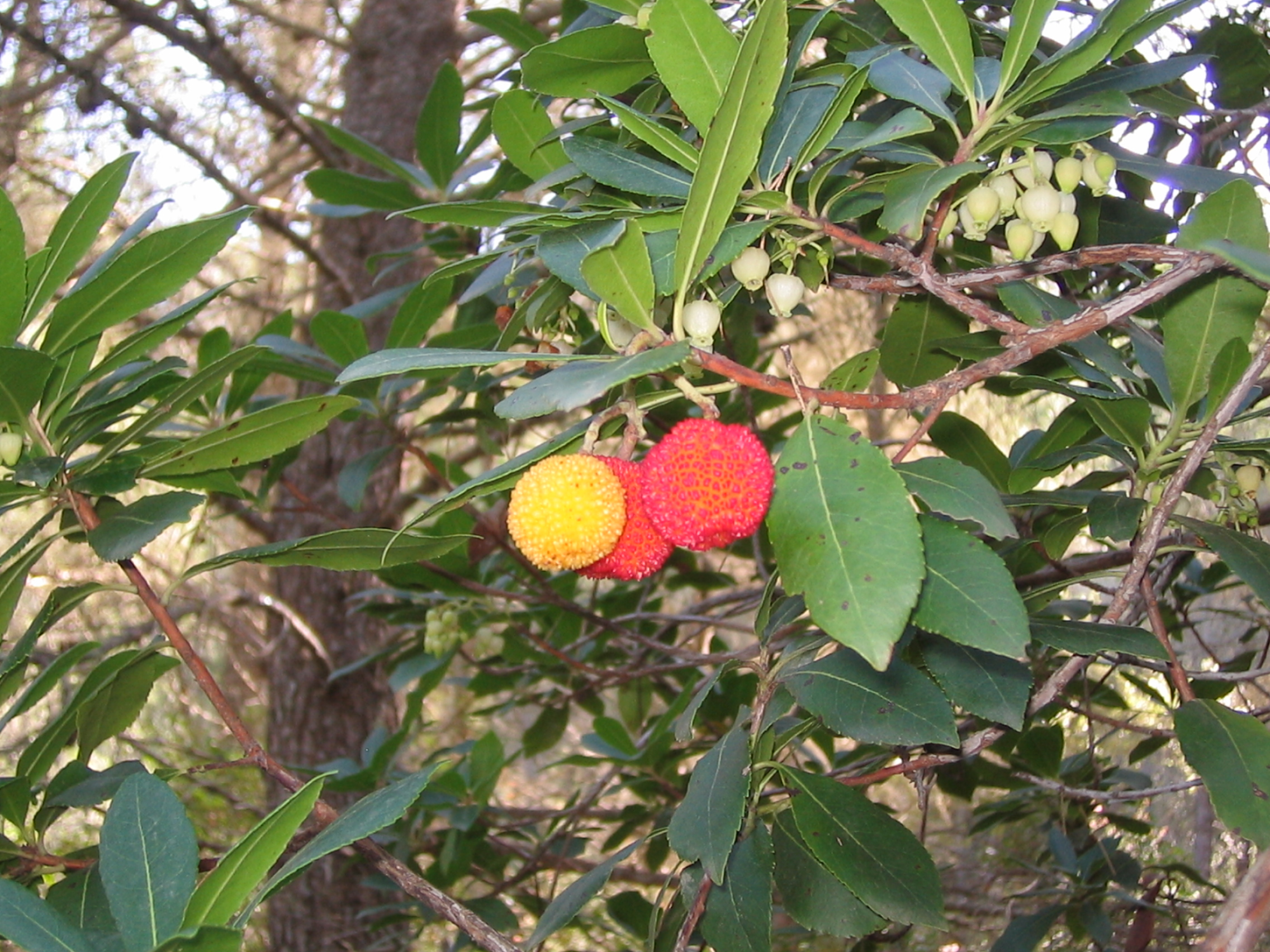
Strawberry tree (Arbutus unedo L.) in the forests of Calviá.

More than 49% of Calvià's 14,552 hectares (35,960 acres) consists of woods and garrigues (low, soft-leaved scrubland), with pines as the dominant trees, although there has been some deforestation in recent decades. Cultivable land amounts to about 32% of the municipality; the main crops are almonds, carob (Ceratonia siliqua), olives and, to a lesser extent, figs. There is also still some farming of cereals and grains.

Although the area has a harsh climate with few natural resources it is also densely populated by humans and there are relatively few populations of wild animals. The most notable zones for fauna are the rocky shore and the islands of Cala Figuera (Figuera Cove), such as El Toro, the islet of Refeubetx and the group of islets known as the Malgrats. This area has international recognition by the European Commission as a Special Protection Area for birds. In 2008, a diver in this reserve sighted and photographed a monk seal (Monachus monachus); it is believed that no more than 500 monk seals survive in the entire world. The Balearic government has studied the possibility of reintroducing monk seals to the islands.

Local native plant species include holm oak (Quercus ilex) and various pine species. There are over 1,000 animal species; notable among them are the seabirds Cory's shearwater (Calonectris diomedea), various cormorants (Phalacrocorax), the common swift (Apus apus), and the Manx shearwater (Puffinus puffinus) as well as numerous reptiles, such as the endemic Lilford's wall lizard (Podarcis lilfordi) found on several of the islets of the archipelago. The islets are also home to one of Spain's few colonies of Hermann's tortoise (Testudo hermanni; other colonies are in Murcia and Almería).

Although the vegetation on the cliffs is sparse, it merits special interest as a habitat for endemic plant species such as the perennial herb Hippocrepis balearica, and Dianthus alpinus, whose Spanish-language names variously designate it as the "cliff carnation", "forest carnation" or "Mediterranean carnation". The cliff also provides a habitat for birds, especially raptors such as Eleonora's falcon (Falco eleonorae) and osprey (Pandion haliaetus) as well as the world's only remaining insular cinereous vultures (black vulture, Aegypius monachus). Also worthy of mention, if only for gastronomical reasons, are two species of snail, Cornu aspersum and Helix pomatia.

Among the fungi, the autumn rains bring out the reproductive structures of the mushrooms. Of particular note is Lactarius sangifluus, known locally as esclata-sang. This Lactarius is much appreciated for its singular flavor, and figures prominently in the local cuisine.

The forest plants of the region can be divided into four groups:

- Herbaceous plants: the most common of these are nettles, fiddle dock (Rumex pulcher), and fennel (Foeniculum vulgare); heather(Calluna vulgaris) can also be found. Five endemic species of Limonium have evolved in the salty soils of Magaluf. In the garrigue of Santa Ponsa are several varieties of orchid (Orchis collina).
- Shrubs: the most common shrub is the Mediterranean buckthorn (Rhamnus alaternus), but there are also rosemary (Rosmarinus officinalis), thyme, a species of rock rose (Cistus albidus) several species of asparagus (Asparagus acutifolius, Asparagus albus, Asparagus officinalis), and common ivy (Hedera helix). Protected species include Mediterranean fan palm (Chamaerops humilis), myrtles, and Phoenicean juniper (Juniperus phoenicea).
- Ferns: ferns of the Polypodium genus can be found in cooler or more shaded areas.
- Trees: the most common tree in the region's forests is Aleppo pine (Pinus halepensis). These are plagued by a moth known as the pine processionary (Thaumetopoea pityocampa). A special brigade targets this moth, setting traps and destroying their nests. In the northern part of the province, although in lesser measure, there is holm oak (Quercus ilex), white poplar (Populus alba), narrow-leafed ash (Fraxinus angustifolia), and strawberry tree (Arbutus unedo L.).

== Demographics ==
Most of the people are either Spaniards from the mainland—mainly from Andalusia—or their descendants, who reached the island in the early 1960s, or they are foreign immigrants. According to the 2008 census, the municipality has a population of 50,777 inhabitants, of whom 25,548 were males and 25,229 were women (50.31% versus 49.69%). The municipality has the second highest population in the Balearic Islands, second only to the capital, Palma de Mallorca.

In 2017 the population was 49,063, including 14,822 foreigners (non-Spanish) registered with the town hall. The total population reached above 50,000 in 2008 but in 2015 began decreasing; in 2016 it had 49,580 people, including 15,623 registered foreigners.

=== Population pyramid ===
Population pyramid 2008
| % | Males | Age | Females | % |
|---|---|---|---|---|
| 0.35 | | 85+ | | 0.63 |
| 0.49 | | 80–84 | | 0.72 |
| 0.80 | | 75–79 | | 0.89 |
| 1.35 | | 70–74 | | 1.37 |
| 1.88 | | 65–69 | | 1.79 |
| 2.71 | | 60–64 | | 2.49 |
| 3.30 | | 55–59 | | 3.11 |
| 3.87 | | 50–54 | | 3.57 |
| 4.32 | | 45–49 | | 4.22 |
| 4.35 | | 40–44 | | 4.60 |
| 4.41 | | 35–39 | | 4.38 |
| 4.57 | | 30–34 | | 4.51 |
| 4.23 | | 25–29 | | 4.20 |
| 3.15 | | 20–24 | | 3.01 |
| 2.76 | | 15–19 | | 2.59 |
| 2.57 | | 10–14 | | 2.63 |
| 2.70 | | 5–9 | | 2.67 |
| 2.48 | | 0–4 | | 2.29 |

Analysis of the population pyramid shows that:

- 21% of the population is under the age of 20.
- 32% of the population is aged 20–39 years.
- 32% of the population is aged 40–59 years.
- 15% of the population is 60 or older.

This structure is typical of the modern demographic regime seen in much of Western Europe, with a population slowly aging as the birth rate diminishes.

== Tourism ==
The area contains many of Mallorca's major tourism hotspots, with the localities of Magaluf (3,865), Santa Ponsa (8,188), El Toro (2,002), Peguera (3,400), Illetes (3,286), Portals Nous (2,395) and Palmanova (5,975). It embraces six tourist zones with 60 kilometres of coastline, 27 beaches, 4 sport ports and 120.000 tourist units. The proximity of Palma with major road connections means that it can take as little as 15 minutes to reach the city centre. With massive tourism, estimated at 1.6 million visits per year and with a resident population that itself includes many expatriates, it is impossible to evaluate municipal income or expenditure as it relates only to the residents. What one can say is that Calvià appears to be one of the wealthiest municipalities in Europe, based on per capita public investment. In the early 1960s, Calvià began building a complete infrastructure for massive tourism, such as rapid construction of hotels. Later, more touristic features were added which included four professional golf courses (Club de Golf Poniente, Golf Sta Ponça I, Golf Sta Ponça II, Golf Sta Ponça III and Golf Bendinat), water parks, a modern promenade called Paseig Calvià.

The 2004 World Chess Olympiad was held in Calvià.

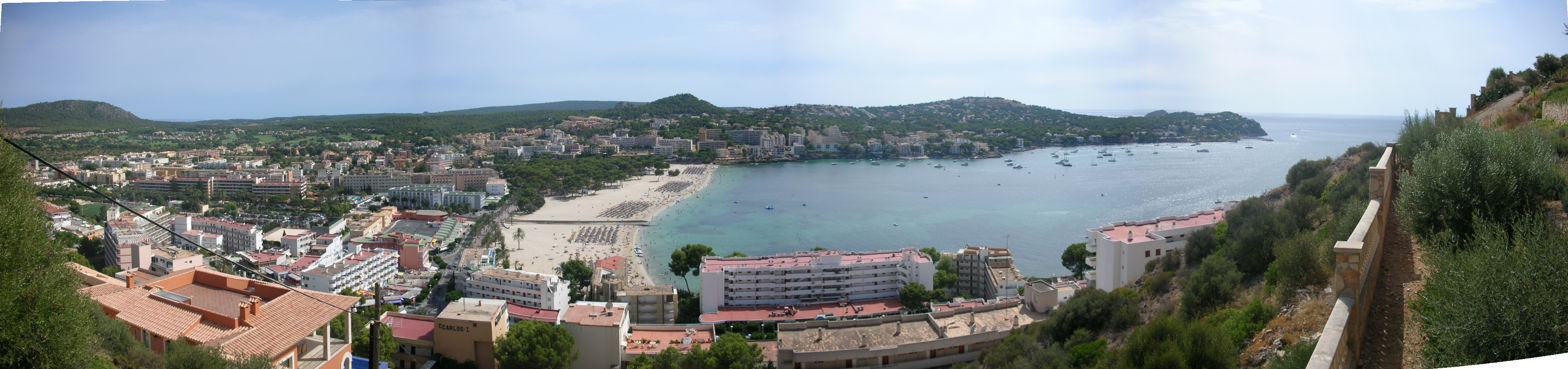
Santa Ponsa

== See also ==
- List of municipalities in Balearic Islands
