= Peter Bover =

Captain Peter Turner Bover (5 October 1772 – 14 December 1802) was an officer of the Royal Navy during the French Revolutionary Wars, who fired the first shot at the Spithead mutiny of 1797.

== Early career ==
He entered the Royal Navy, following in the footsteps of his father (Captain John Bover) and two of his elder brothers, as a volunteer aboard HMS Perseus. He transferred to HMS Queen the same year, and then to HMS Crown, then the flagship of Commodore Cornwallis. Cornwallis took a great interest in Bover's career, as did Admiral Affleck, who wrote that "Bover... is a name which will always be dear to the service". He was appointed a lieutenant on 3 January 1794, serving in HMS Minerva, HMS Excellent and HMS Caesar, before being appointed the First Lieutenant of HMS London, a 98-gun first-rate, in 1797; it served as the flagship of Admiral Sir John Colpoys.

== Mutiny at Spithead ==
In early May, the Spithead mutiny had been active for around three weeks, but remained subdued; the commanders had not yet brought matters to a head by a forcible confrontation with the sailors. On Sunday 7th, a boat of delegates pulled around various ships of the fleet, urging them to overthrow their officers and set sail; on coming to London, it was refused permission to come aboard. The atmosphere grew tense — the seamen of London were clearly in favour of receiving the delegates — and a group of men on the forecastle began to move a gun to point at the quarterdeck, where the ship's officers stood. Bover, on deck as the first lieutenant, ordered them to stop and threatened to fire on them; all but one did so. The remaining seaman, however, dared Bover to fire and carried on; Bover fired a moment later, killing the sailor. This sparked a riot, with men storming up from below decks; in the ensuing violence, several men on both sides were wounded (three sailors fatally) and the Marines defected to the mutineers. On seeing this, Admiral Colpoys immediately surrendered to avert further bloodshed.

Bover was quickly seized by a group of sailors, who dragged him to the foremast and were intending to hang him summarily, before he was released through the intercession of Valentine Joyce, one of the delegates, who embraced him and — according to a witness — cried out "If you hang this young man you shall hang me, for I shall never quit him". In the moment of confusion, during which some more of the crew shouted in support of the "brave boy", Admiral Colpoys ran forward and insisted that the responsibility was his own.

The two found themselves on the forecastle, standing among seven or eight hundred angry (and armed) seamen. The situation was defused, and further violence averted, in "the most paradoxical thing in this paradoxical mutiny" (Manwaring & Dobrée, p. 90), when a voice from the mob yelled that the Admiral was "a damned bloody scoundrel"; the seamen immediately lowered their guns and began to rebuke the speaker with cries of "How dare you speak to the Admiral in that manner!" In the ensuing lull, the ship's surgeon, who was popular among the men, argued that they should let the Admiral speak in Bover's defence. Colpoys promptly announced that Bover had been following orders — recent Admiralty orders insisting that any signs of mutiny be handled strongly. Eventually Bover was released, through the intercession of Joyce and another of the delegates, Mark Turner, a midshipman from Terrible, and helped by his previous status as a favourite among the crew.

Colpoys, Bover, and Griffith, the captain of London, were kept on board as prisoners whilst the other officers of the fleet were turned ashore. On the 8th they were tried for murder by a court of the sailors, with Colpoys found guilty but released some days later. Bover himself was saved through an enthusiastic speech given by John Fleming, an able seaman of London, who sat on the court as a delegate, in which he pleaded with the court not to seek revenge for revenge's sake. Speaking for the crew of London, he described Bover as "...a deserving worthy gentleman, who is an ornament to his profession in every respect", and stated that before he would sign his name to Bover's death warrant he would insist on being killed with him.

The speech — it survives as a written letter, and it is unclear if he delivered it personally or if it was read — was decisive, coming as it did from the comrades of the man who had been killed originally; Bover was released by order of the delegates on the evening of the 9th, and allowed to remain on the London.

On the 11th he, Colpoys, and Griffiths came ashore to be tried by a civil court for the death of a seaman who had died in hospital at Haslar; the court returned a verdict of justifiable homicide. The crew had been unwilling to let Bover leave the ship, but he had promised to return. Despite the urging of many of his colleagues he did so, being greeted with three cheers when he came back aboard and requested not to leave again.

He recorded afterwards that his standing with the ship's company was greatly increased by the whole event, not only through being cleared by the court but through being the only officer to remain on ship during the mutiny — all others had been sent ashore and not permitted to return. He continued to serve aboard London until promoted in February 1798, with no negative effects to his career from having remained with the mutineers.

== Later career ==
Following the mutiny, he was appointed to Hecla, a ten-gun bomb ship, which served in support of landings on the Dutch coast in August 1797; he was appointed commander on 14 February 1798. He was made post-captain on 11 August 1800 and later appointed to the command of the Blenheim and the Magnificent. Ordered to the West Indies with Magnificent in 1802, he died there of a sudden illness on 14 December, shortly after arriving in port.

He married in 1800, to a Miss Cole, the sister of Dr. Cole, vice-chancellor of the University of Oxford, and of Sir Christopher Cole, a fellow officer who he had served with as a midshipman; they had no children.

== Sources ==
A detailed account of Bover's part in the events of the mutiny, drawing heavily on contemporary accounts, is on pp. 89–102 of The floating republic: an account of the mutinies at Spithead and the Nore in 1797, G.E. Manwaring & Bonamy Dobrée (Penguin, 1937). A copy of Fleming's speech is in Appendix III of that book. Dates of appointments are from vol. 1 of David Syret's Commissioned Sea Officers of the Royal Navy, 1660–1815.

A general biographical sketch is taken from Memoirs of the Bover Family by "J. N." in the Gentleman's Magazine, July 1843 (digitised copy; also included are extracts from Bover's letters during the mutiny. This source contradicts the dates in Syret, and is inconsistent with other sources — for example, the Memoirs' statement that he commanded the Hecla in 1797 is contradicted by the Naval History of Great Britain, vol. 2. p. 118, which places it under the command of Thomas Hand, and contrary to their statement it is not recorded as serving at Camperdown (ibid., vol. 2 appendix 3).
