= Peguera =

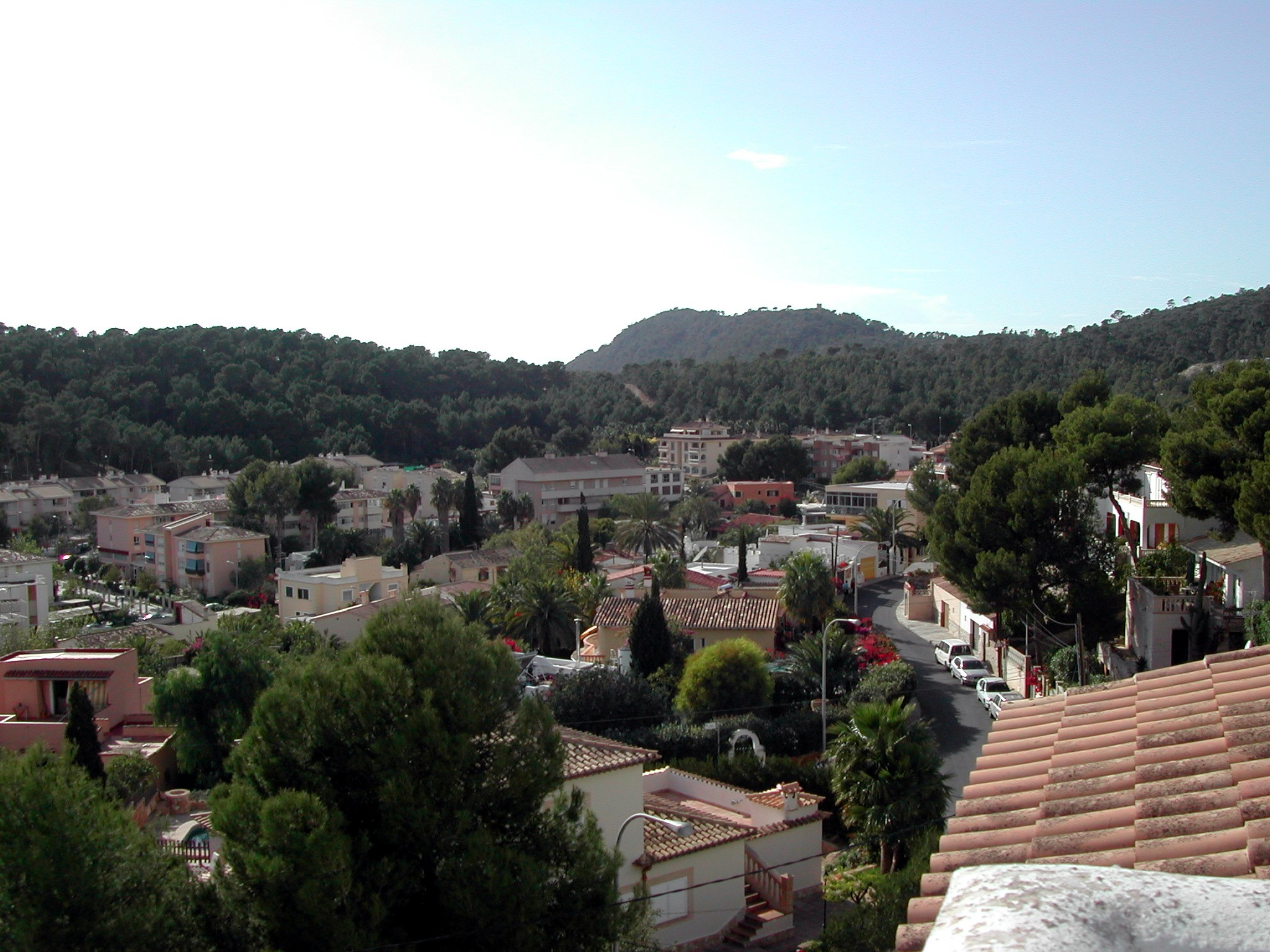
- Peguera

- Peguera shown within Majorca
- Coordinates: 39°32′15.47″N 2°27′1.69″E
- Sovereign state: Spain
- Autonomous community: Balearic Islands
- Province: Balearic Islands
- Island: Majorca
- Comarca: Serra de Tramuntana
- Municipality: Calvià

Population (2009)
  - Total: 3,988
- Postal code: 07160
- Dialling code: 971

Peguera (translation from Catalan: "oven tar"; and the spelling on official road signs) is a tourist town in the municipality of Calvià on the island of Majorca (Mallorca in Spanish and Catalan), part of the Spanish autonomous community of the Balearic Islands. It has three large beaches and hundreds of hotels, hostels and apartments. The population is approximately 3,988 inhabitants. The town's name refers to the oven tar produced in this area from the pitch of pine tree resin.

Paguera, an alternative spelling apparently used locally, is a beach resort in the very southwest of Majorca in Spain. It is part of the municipality of Calvia. There are bus connections from Palma de Mallorca. It is particularly popular with German tourists to the point of being referred to as "Little Germany." A big shopping street goes the length of the resort. It is popular for the hiking routes in the back parts of the location and for Catamaran and boat trips that part from the resort.
