= Joaquín María Bover de Roselló =

Spanish writer and editor

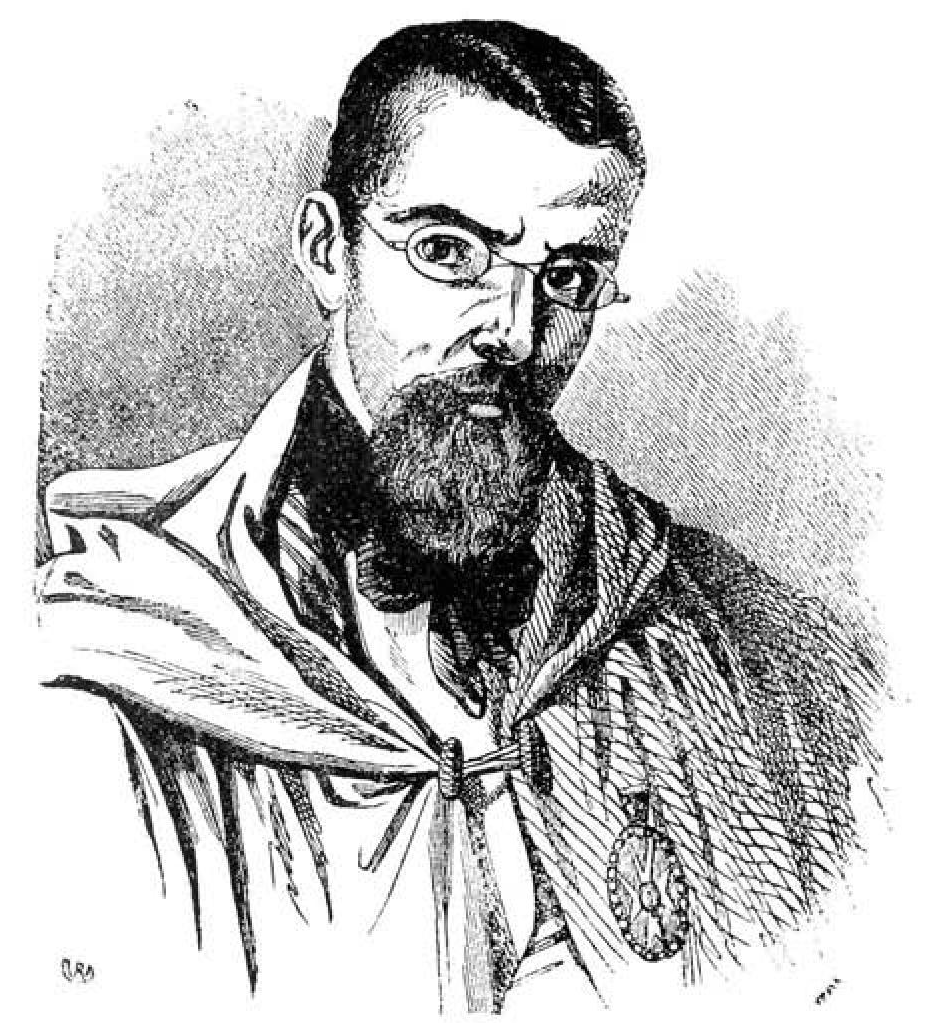
- Engraving of Joaquín in 1848
- Born: 1810; Seville
- Died: 1865 (aged 54–55); Palma de Mallorca
- Occupations: Writer and Editor
- Writing career
- Language: Spanish, Catalan

Joaquín María Bover de Roselló (1810 in Seville – 1865 in Palma de Mallorca) was a Spanish writer and editor who wrote primarily in Spanish but also some poems in Catalan. Bover grew up on Majorca, with occasional stays in Madrid. He was an avid student of the Balearic Islands, writing several books about its geographical and historical aspects, as well as several studies on its writers and literature, such as his dictionary on Balearic writers. He also wrote inspirational poems and poems about local circumstance (at least some of them in Catalan), as well as compiling a Mallorcan Catalan-Spanish dictionary.

== Partial list of his works ==
- 1831, Estellencs : descripción histórico-geográfica 1831
- 1833, La feliz llegada a Palma del ... Señor Juan Antonio Manet, Capitan General de las islas Baleares
- 1833, Oda Sájica a la Real Jura de la Serenísima Señora Princesa de Asturias Doña Isabel Luisa de Borbón
- 1834, Oda a la Reina
- 1836, Noticias histórico-topográfico de la isla de Mallorca : estadistica general de ella y periodos memorables de su historia
- 1836, Oda a la libertad
- 1836, Recuerdos de Mahón
- 1836, Diccionario manual Mallorquín-Castellano
- 1838, Memoria de los pobladores de Mallorca despues de la última conquista por d. Jaime I de Aragon, y noticia de las heredades asignadas á cada uno de ellos en el reparto general de la isla. Sacada de varios códices, historias y documentos inéditos
- 1839, Del origen, vicisitudes y estado actual de la literatura en la isla de Mallorca
- 1842, Contestación de Joaquin Maria Bover de Rosello ... al artículo del genio de la Libertad del 28 de setiembre último
- 1842, Memoria biográfica de los mallorquines que se han distinguido en la antigua y moderna literatura
- 1845, Noticia historico-artistica de los museos del Eminentísimo Señor Cardenal Bespuig existentes en Mallorca
- 1862, Diccionario bibliográfico de las publicaciones periódicas de las Baleares
- 1868, Biblioteca de escritores baleares, a dictionary on the various writers from the Balearic Islands. The first volume can be consulted or downloaded at the American Libraries Internet Archives
