= La Porrassa =

Coordinates: 39°30′2.21″N 2°30′59.32″E

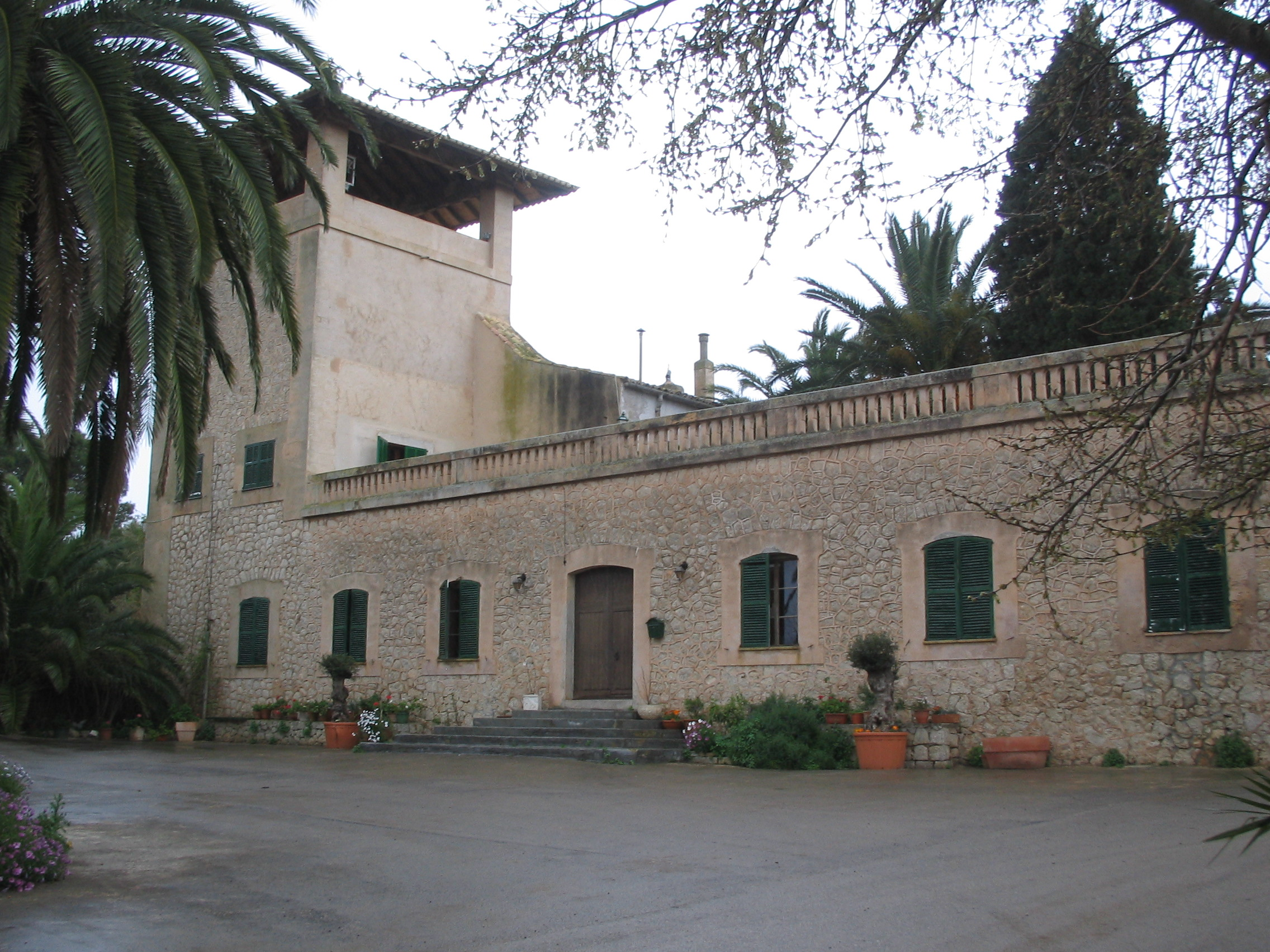
- The farmhouse Sa Porrassa, showing its tower bell
- Interactive map of La Porrassa
- Country: Spain
- Autonomous community: Balearic Islands
- Island: Majorca
- Municipality: Calvià

Population
  - Total: c. 128

La Porrassa is a small farm town in the municipality of Calvià on the island of Majorca, part of the Spanish autonomous community of the Balearic Islands. It is adjacent to Son Ferrer to the west and Magaluf to the south. The municipality's promenade, the Paseo Calvia, winds through La Porrassa. It has a population of approximately 128 inhabitants.

== History ==
The army of King James I of Aragon camped in the La Porrassa area when he started the conquest of the island.

There are only a few houses beside the large country farmhouse of the landowner. The farmhouse was built between 1595 and 1616 with sandstone and stone masonry. It has a tower for defense that stands 40 m (130 ft) above sea level. The tower remains in good condition and is protected by the Spanish heritage law. Its main chamber rises 4 m (13 ft) off the ground and, through a spiral staircase, takes you to the next floor.

The town has a nursery, a school and two water parks.
