= Son Ferrer =

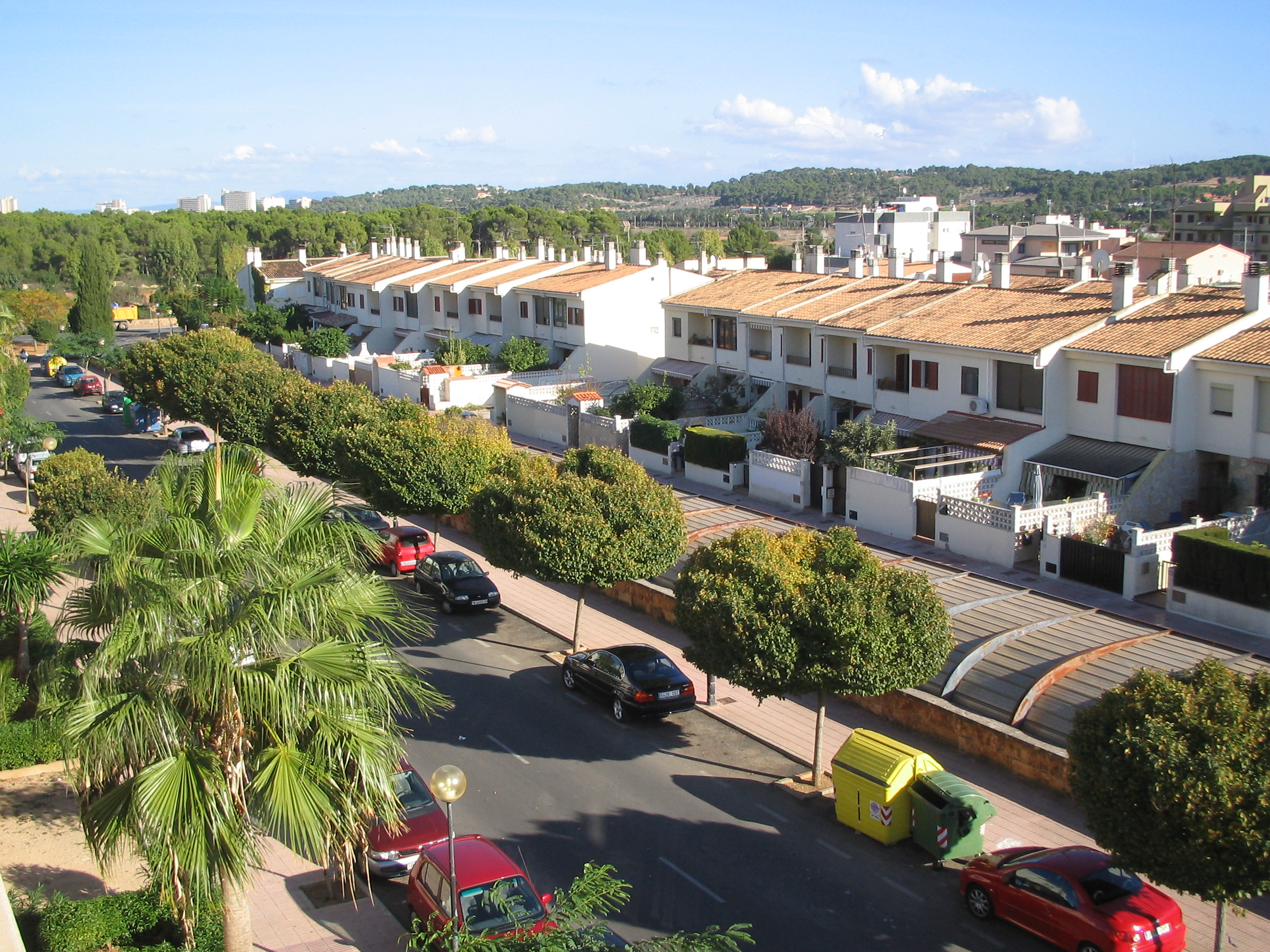
- Chalets in Son Ferrer

- Son Ferrer shown within Majorca
- Coordinates: 39°29′45″N 02°30′06″E
- Sovereign state: Spain
- Autonomous community: Balearic Islands
- Province: Balearic Islands
- Island: Majorca
- Comarca: Serra de Tramuntana
- Municipality: Calvià

Population (2009)
  - Total: 5,666
- Postal code: 07181
- Dialling code: 971

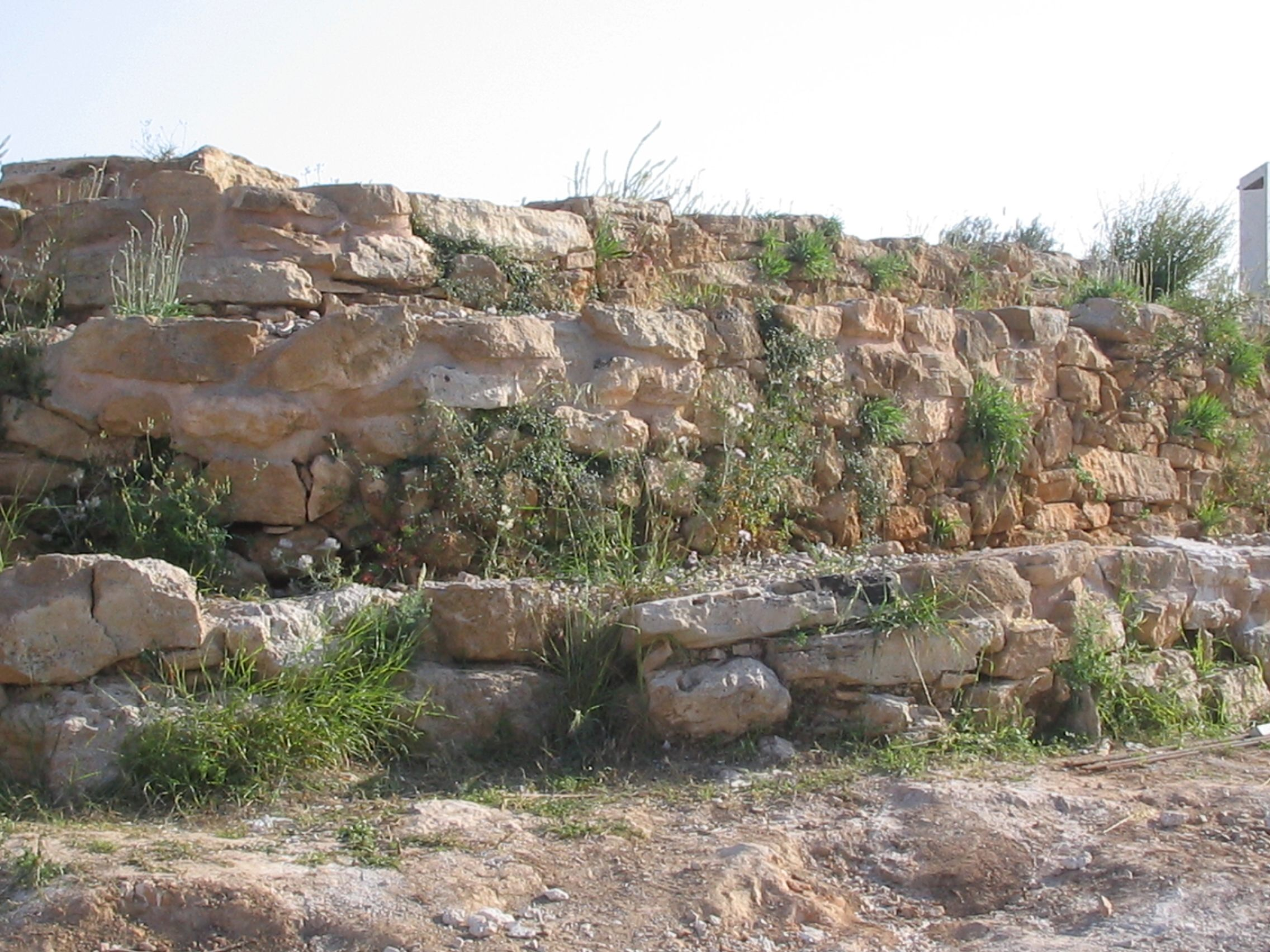
archaeological burial site in Son Ferrer.

Son Ferrer is a new village in the municipality of Calvià on the island of Majorca, part of the Spanish autonomous community of the Balearic Islands. Son Ferrer is located about 20 km (12 mi) from the capital, Palma de Mallorca. Its neighbors include La Porrassa to the east, El Toro to the west, Santa Ponsa to the northwest, and the forested area of Cala Figuera. Son Ferrer is surrounded by forests of pine and is adjacent to farms. It is divided into two zones, a commercial area and a residential area. The census in 2008 was 5666 inhabitants.

Amenities include a community swimming pool built in 2008, and a golf course to the south and west near the Puig de Saragossa. Paseo Calviá, a promenade of the municipality, passes through Son Ferrer. A peculiarity of the town is that every street except for one, the Ca'n Ferrer, is named after a bird. Commercial streets carry names of large birds, while the residential areas have small bird street names. The town has its own football team, CF Son Ferrer.

== History ==
Before development, the area was known as Can Ferrer, which included a Majorcan style farmhouse with hundreds of almond, mulberry, fig and carob trees. The land belonged to Antonio Segui Ferrer who sold it to the municipality of Calvia which designed the development, and promoted and managed the sale of the plots.

The town is approximately 2 mi (3.2 km) from Puig de sa Morisca Archaeological Park which contains megalithic remains and part of a talaiot. archaeological excavation of a burial site, the tomb of Son Ferrer, from 2000 through 2009, and included collaboration with experts from several institutions, including the University of the Balearic Islands. During the Bronze Age and Late Talaiótico, the tomb served as a necropolis where the remains of over a hundred people, including infants, were found. Naviforme remains are located in the wooded area between Son Ferrer and the golf course.
