= El Toro (Mallorca) =

Coordinates: 39°29′20.73″N 2°28′51.29″E

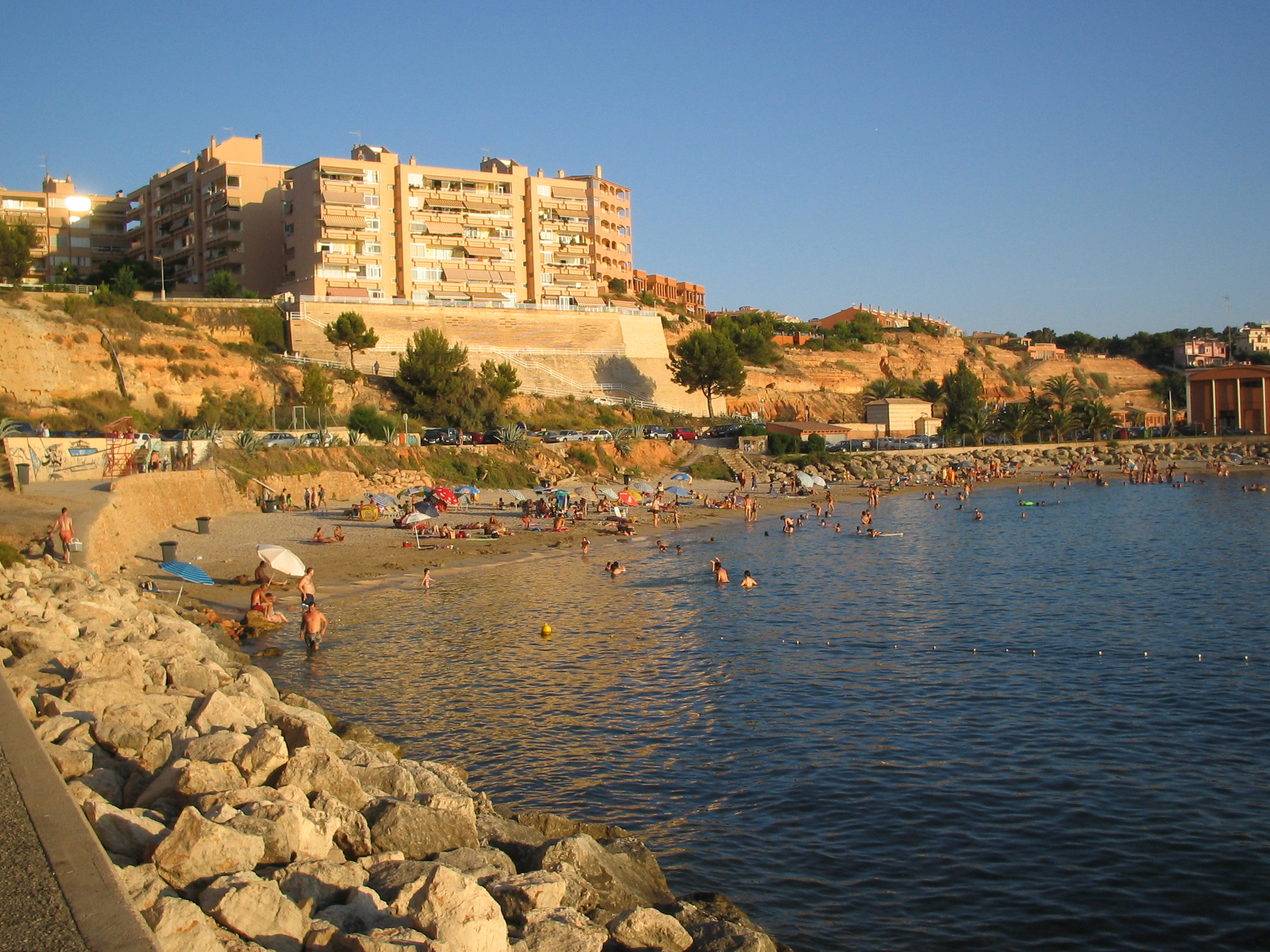
An El Toro beach.

El Toro (translation: "the bull") is a neighborhood in the municipality of Calvià on the island of Majorca, part of the Spanish autonomous community of the Balearic Islands. It is located in an area known as Ses Penyes Rotges. El Toro is adjacent to the Santa Ponsa Golf II, to the north, the urbanized Nova Santa Ponsa on the west, the Son Ferrer to the east. Paseo Calviá, a promenade of the municipality, passes through El Toro. El Toro is a seaside community, next to a cliff. Many of the houses are built to the edge of the cliff. It has a harbor, Port Adriano, and a hotel. The main beach is Racó de sa Fragata. There are also two smaller beaches, one of which is only accessible by boat or by swimming. The population is approximately 2,321 inhabitants.
