= Santa Ponsa =

Santa Ponsa Santa Ponça (in Catalan) Santa Ponsa (in Spanish)
- Santa Ponça
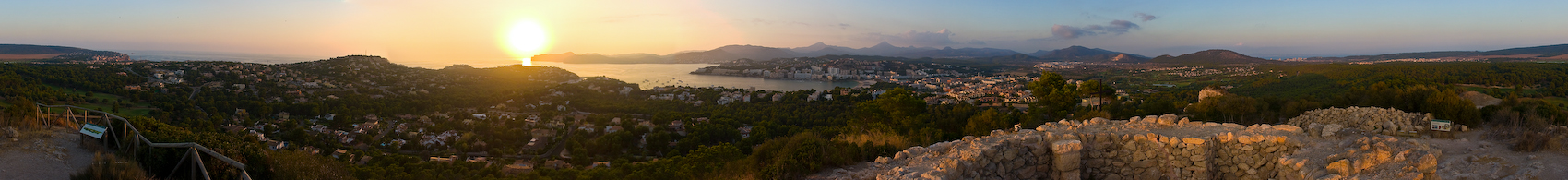
- Santa Ponsa

- Santa Ponsa shown within Mallorca Santa Ponsa (Balearic Islands) Santa Ponsa (Spain)
- Coordinates: 39°30′17.28″N 2°28′9.66″E
- Country: Spain
- Autonomous community: Balearic Islands
- Province: Balearic Islands
- Island: Mallorca
- Comarca: Serra de Tramuntana
- Municipality: Calvià
- Postal code: 07180
- Dialling code: 971

Santa Ponsa (Catalan and officially: Santa Ponça) is a small town in the southwest of Mallorca. Located in the municipality of Calvià, it is 18 kilometres from the capital Palma.

== History ==
It was long believed that the name Santa Ponsa was derived from a Roman villa called Santa Ponctia. In fact it derives from the Arabic words Sanat Busa, which refer to an area of rush bushes.

Santa Ponsa is where King James I of Aragon (Jaume in Catalan) landed on September 12, 1229, in his successful quest to conquer the island and take it from the Moors after more than 300 years of Muslim rule.

Following James's conquest, Majorca became part of the Crown of Aragon; it later was annexed to the Monarchy of Spain. A cross at the sea entrance to the marina marks the spot where King James landed. Every September a grand fiesta is held to commemorate the landing with a mock battle between the Moors and Christians on the beach. The two-week fiesta incorporates a pop concert and fireworks display.

== Tourism ==
The town is a popular holiday destination. Especially from May to October, it attracts people from countries with colder climates, such as Germany, the Netherlands, Ireland, and the United Kingdom. Some visitors have bought villas and apartments in the hills on each side of the bay.

In recent years, it has become a popular party destination among youths due to its nightlife and also its proximity to Magaluf, another party area.

== Facilities ==
Santa Ponsa has two 18-hole (I, II) and one 9-hole golf courses (III). Santa Ponsa II has hosted a PGA European Tour event and is open only to club members. Its 18th green is in the shape of the island of Mallorca within a pond, reached by a bridge.

The Baleares International College, an English school founded in 1956, is located on the road to the nearby village of Magaluf.

Santa Ponsa also has a private marina, Club Náutico Santa Ponsa (Santa Ponsa Yacht Club), built in 1975 within the natural cove known as "Sa Caleta". The marina can accommodate up to 522 boats from 7m to 20m in length as well as offering dry dock services.

Santa Ponsa hosts the Balearic Islands node of the COMETA electric power transmission system from the Spanish mainland.

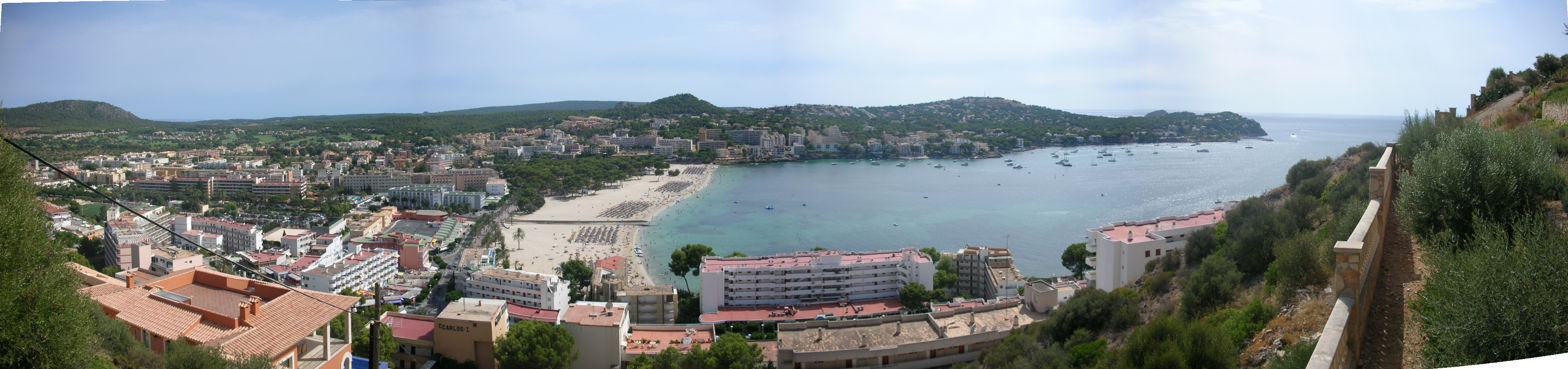

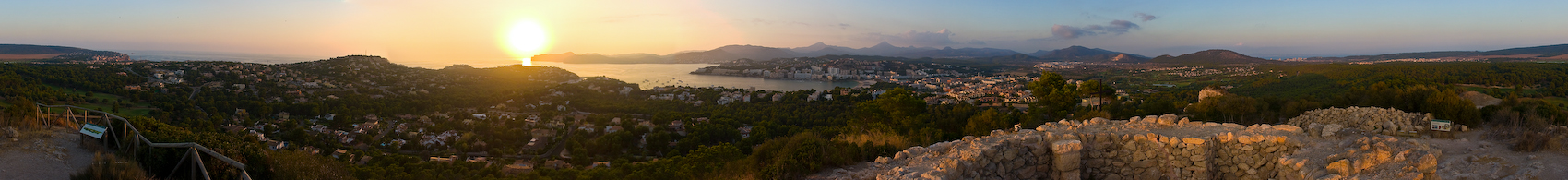

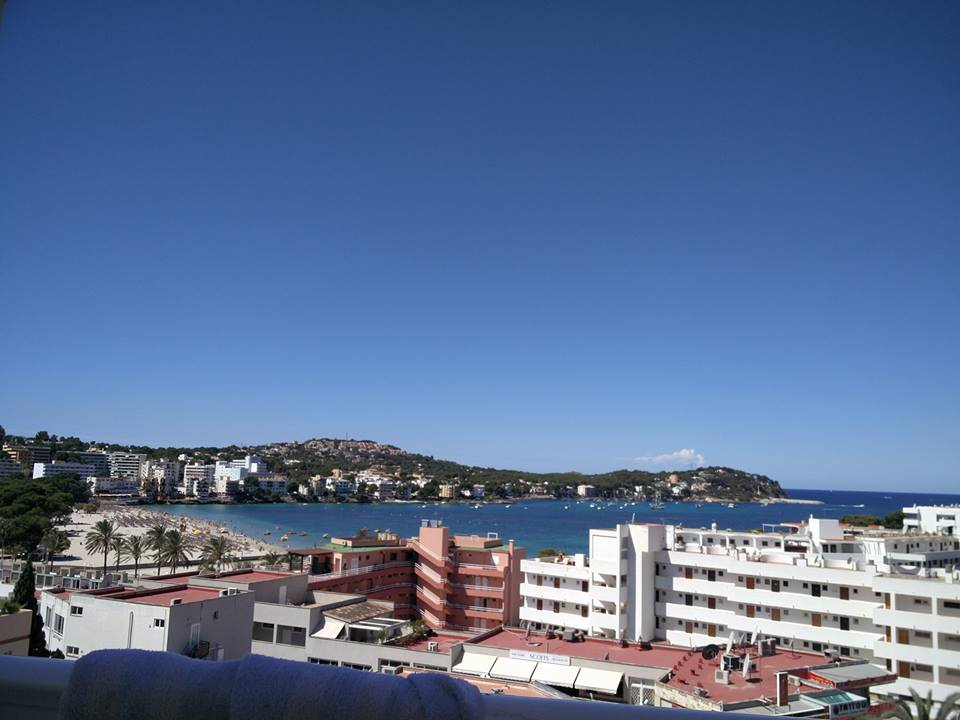
Balcony view from Deya Hotel

Santa Ponsa is a holiday location for people of all ages, However, it is especially well recognised to be a holiday location for teens of the age 17 and up and was listed as the top ten holiday spot for older teens.
