= Liolaemus araucaniensis =

Conservation status
- Least Concern (IUCN 3.1)

Scientific classification
- Kingdom: Animalia
- Phylum: Chordata
- Class: Reptilia
- Order: Squamata
- Suborder: Iguania
- Family: Liolaemidae
- Genus: Liolaemus
- Species: L. araucaniensis

Binomial name
- Liolaemus araucaniensis Müller & Hellmich, 1932

Species of lizard

Liolaemus araucaniensis is a species of lizard in the family Liolaemidae. It is native to Chile and Argentina.
