= Peak tree iguana =

Peak tree iguana is a common name for two species of iguana:

- Liolaemus chillanensis
- Liolaemus monticola
