= Pantaleu =

Pantaleu Es Pantaleu
- Island
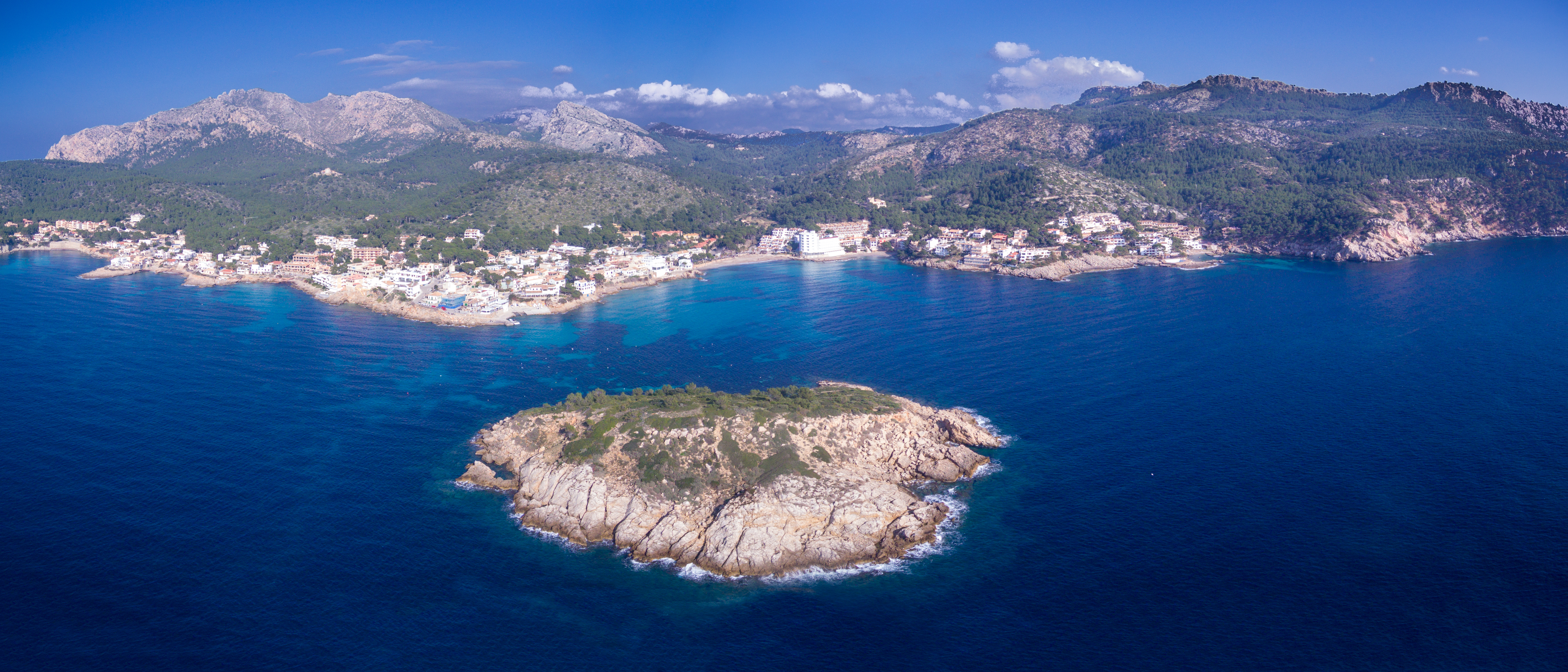

- Location in Spain
- Coordinates: 39°34′37″N 02°20′52″E
- Country: Spain
- Autonomous community: Balearic Islands
- Council: Consell Insular de Mallorca
- Municipality: Sant Elm

Area
  - Total: 0.024 km^{2} (0.0093 sq mi)
- Highest elevation: 26 m (85 ft)

Population
  - Total: no permanent population
- Time zone: UTC+1 (CET)
  - Summer (DST): UTC+2 (CEST)

Es Pantaleu (Catalan) or El Pantaleu (Spanish) is an uninhabited islet in the Balearic Islands, Spain, located just off the west coast of Majorca. It is currently a natural park, part of the natural park of its neighboring island Dragonera. It has an area of 2,4 ha and its highest point is 26 m AMSL.

== Geography ==
Geologically speaking, Pantaleu is an emerged part of the geologic system running southwest–northeast in the Iberian Peninsula. This runs from the Province of Málaga through Cap de la Nau and then gets submerged under the Mediterranean Sea. It surfaces again to form the island of Ibiza, the Tramuntana Range in the island of Majorca and Pantaleu itself.

The island is a part of the municipality of Andratx, which is, along with Sant Elm (both in nearby Majorca), the closest towns to the island.

== History ==
This islet gained historical importance in 1229 when James I of Aragon in September of this year dropped anchor by this island in order to protect his ships from the storm. They explored the coast of Majorca from here and chose the strand near today's Santa Ponça as an ideal landing point for the Crusaders to start the Reconquista of the Balearic Islands. The gulf of Sant Elm proved to be a good place for defense.

Lying about 300 m from the strand of Sant Elm, the island is a popular destination for good swimmers. Since 1998 it belongs to the Dragonera nature reserve and must not be entered.
