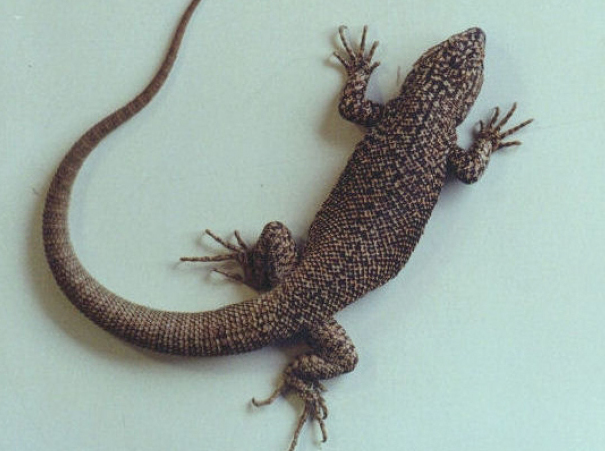

Conservation status
- Endangered (IUCN 3.1)

Scientific classification
- Kingdom: Animalia
- Phylum: Chordata
- Class: Reptilia
- Order: Squamata
- Suborder: Iguania
- Family: Liolaemidae
- Genus: Liolaemus
- Species: L. lorenzmuelleri

Binomial name
- Liolaemus lorenzmuelleri Hellmich, 1950

Synonyms
- Liolaemus lorenzmülleri Hellmich, 1950; Liolaemus lorenzmuelleri — J. Peters et al., 1970

= Liolaemus lorenzmuelleri =

Species of lizard

Liolaemus lorenzmuelleri, commonly known as Lorenz's tree iguana, is a species of lizard in the family Liolaemidae. The species is endemic to Chile.

== Etymology ==
The specific name, lorenzmuelleri, is in honor of German herpetologist Lorenz Müller.

== Geographic range ==
L. lorenzmuelleri is found in Coquimbo Region, Chile.

== Habitat ==
The preferred natural habitat of L. lorenzmuelleri is grassland, at altitudes of 3,200–3,500 m (10,500–11,500 ft).

== Reproduction ==
L. lorenzmuelleri is oviparous.
