= Liolaemus neuquensis =

Conservation status
- Data Deficient (IUCN 3.1)

Scientific classification
- Kingdom: Animalia
- Phylum: Chordata
- Class: Reptilia
- Order: Squamata
- Suborder: Iguania
- Family: Liolaemidae
- Genus: Liolaemus
- Species: L. neuquensis

Binomial name
- Liolaemus neuquensis Müller & Hellmich, 1939

Species of lizard

Liolaemus neuquensis is a species of lizard in the family Iguanidae. It is found in Argentina.
