= Liolaemus ramonensis =

Scientific classification
- Kingdom: Animalia
- Phylum: Chordata
- Class: Reptilia
- Order: Squamata
- Suborder: Iguania
- Family: Liolaemidae
- Genus: Liolaemus
- Species: L. ramonensis

Binomial name
- Liolaemus ramonensis Müller & Hellmich, 1932

Species of iguanian lizard endemic to Chile

Liolaemus ramonensis is a species of iguanian lizard endemic to Chile. Liolaemus ramonensis is a viviparous, omnivorous reptile endemic to Chile, distributed in the Andean mountain range around Santiago. It is large and massive. Its tail can be up to twice its body length. Its head is longer than it is wide, and its neck is thick and noticeably folded. This highland species is a burrowing, saxicolous species that shelters in caves it builds near or beneath rock formations. It has been evaluated as "least concern" on the IUCN Red List of Threatened Species.
