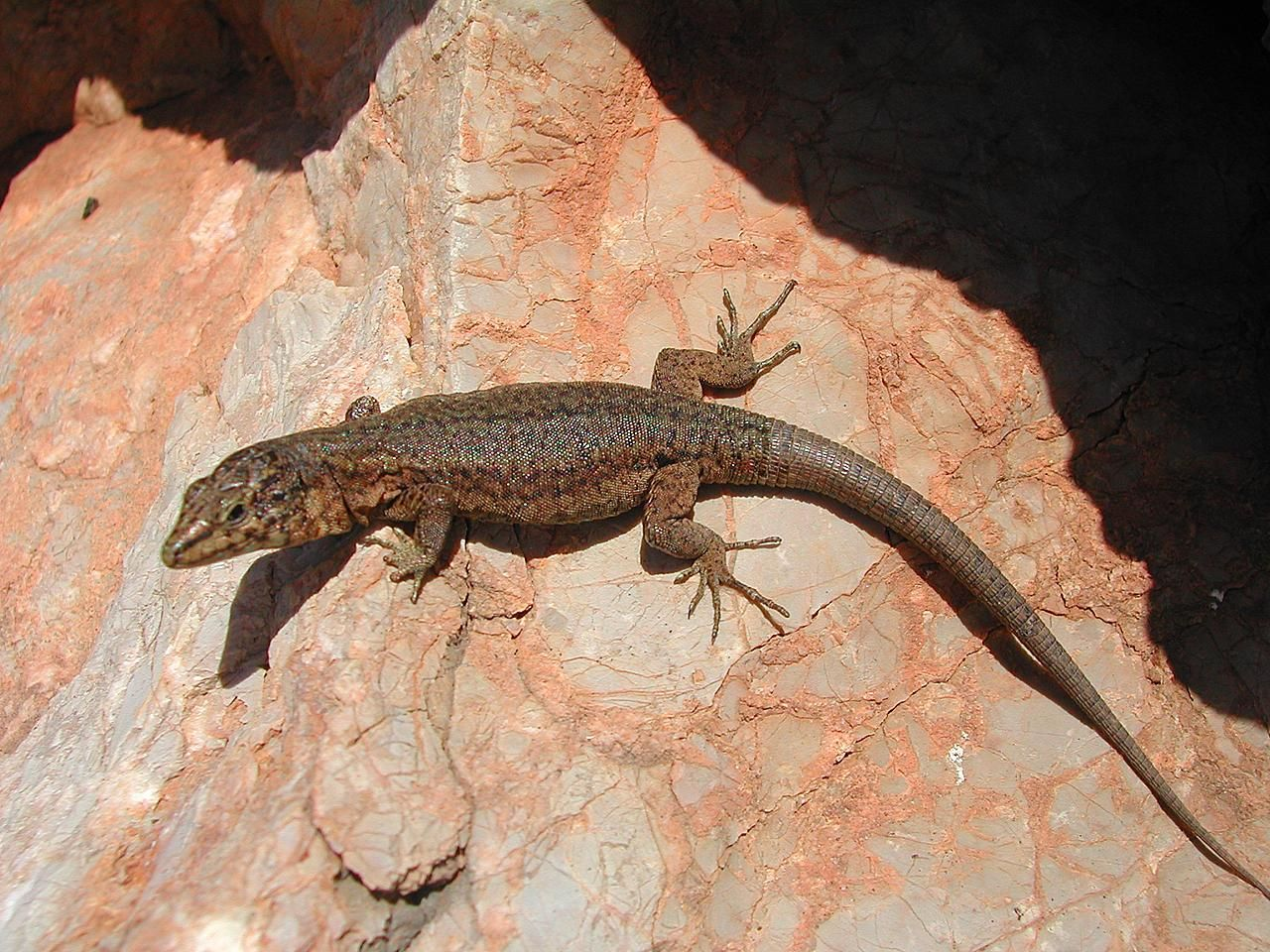

Conservation status
- Endangered (IUCN 3.1)
- CITES Appendix II

Scientific classification
- Kingdom: Animalia
- Phylum: Chordata
- Class: Reptilia
- Order: Squamata
- Family: Lacertidae
- Genus: Podarcis
- Species: P. lilfordi

Binomial name
- Podarcis lilfordi (Günther, 1874)
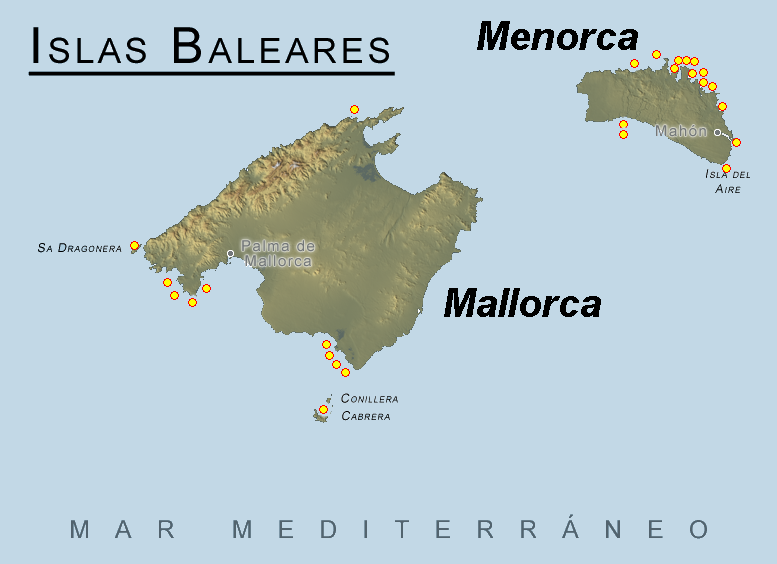
- Geographic range

Synonyms
- Zootoca lilfordi Günther, 1874; Lacerta lilfordi — L. Müller, 1927; Podarcis lilfordi — Engelmann et al., 1993

= Lilford's wall lizard =

Lilford's wall lizard Temporal range: 2.58–0 Ma Pleistocene – Recent

Species of lizard

Lilford's wall lizard (Podarcis lilfordi) is a species of lizard in the family Lacertidae. The species is endemic to the Gymnesian Islands, the easternmost of the Balearic Islands, Spain. There are 27 subspecies that are recognized as being valid.

Its natural habitats are temperate Mediterranean-type shrubby vegetation, rocky areas, and rocky shores. Originally distributed throughout the Gymnesians including the main islands of Mallorca and Menorca, the introduction of alien species which started with the Romans has confined the species to the uninhabited islets around the major islands, on almost each of which a local subspecies has evolved. It is threatened by habitat loss.

== Etymology ==
P. lilfordi is named in honour of Thomas Powys, 4th Baron Lilford, a British ornithologist who studied the fauna of the Balearics.

== Description ==
Lilford's wall lizard grows to a maximum snout-to-vent length (SVL) of 8 cm (3 in), but adults are usually a little smaller than this. The tail is about 1.8 times as long as the body. It is a robust streamlined lizard with a short head and rounded body with smooth, unkeeled scales. The dorsal surface is usually greenish or brownish but varies much between different island subpopulations. There is usually a pale dorso-lateral stripe and there may be several dark streaks or three dark lines running along the spine. The flanks may be slightly reticulated and the underside is white, cream or pinkish. The throat may be blotched with darker colour. Juveniles sometimes have a blue tail.

== Geographic range ==
Lilford's wall lizard is native to the Gymnesian Islands, including Mallorca, Menorca, the Cabrera Archipelago to the south of Mallorca, and the neighbouring rocky islets, which united into a single landmass during the colder periods of the Pleistocene. In historical times it has been extirpated from the two large islands and is now only present on the islets. It was never found on the Pityusic Islands, west of the Gymnesian Islands.

== Habitat ==
P. lilfordi is found at low altitudes. It is a mainly ground-dwelling species and largely inhabits rocky areas and scrubland, although it is found in woodland on Cabrera.

== Behaviour ==
Lilford's wall lizard is a relatively tame lizard and easy to approach. It mainly feeds on insects, spiders and other arthropods, snails and some vegetable matter. This includes flowers and fruits, nectar and pollen. Some plants endemic to the Gymnesian Islands depend on this lizard for pollination. Other plants known to be pollinated by it include the mastic tree (Pistacia lentiscus), rock samphire (Crithmum maritimum), wild leek (Allium ampeloprasum), clustered carline thistle (Carlina corymbosa) and the sea daffodil (Pancratium maritimum). It is opportunistic around birds' nests in the use of scraps of food that have been regurgitated by gulls for their chicks. It also sometimes moves to the vicinity of nests of the Eleonora's falcon (Falco eleonorae) and feeds on the remains of its prey and the flies that accumulate around the nesting site. It is sometimes cannibalistic, eating juveniles and the tails of other lizards of its own species.

== Reproduction ==
P. lilfordi is oviparous. Breeding takes place in the summer, and females may lay up to three clutches of one to four eggs with an average mass of 0.63 g, large for a lizard of this size. The eggs hatch in about eight weeks, and the emerging young measure about 3 to 3.5 cm (1.2 to 1.4 in) from snout to vent.

== Conservation status ==
The population of this lizard seems to be in decline. It was at one time very numerous on Menorca and Mallorca but is no longer found on either. This extirpation may have been caused by the proliferation of cats and by other introduced predators, possibly the false smooth snake (Macroprotodon cucullatus) and the weasel (Mustela nivalis). Its total area of occupancy on all the small islands on which it is now present is less than 500 km^{2} (193.1 sq mi); so the IUCN lists it as being "Endangered".

== Subspecies ==
There are 27 recognized subspecies many of which are found on only a single island:

- Podarcis lilfordi lilfordi (Günther, 1874) – Aire islet, off the southeastern coast of Menorca
- Podarcis lilfordi addayae (Eisentraut, 1928)
- Podarcis lilfordi balearica (Bedriaga, 1879)
- Podarcis lilfordi brauni (L. Müller, 1927) – Colom islet, off Menorca
- Podarcis lilfordi carbonerae Pérez-Mellado & Salvador, 1988 – Carbonera islet, off Menorca
- Podarcis lilfordi codrellensis Pérez-Mellado & Salvador, 1988 – Binicondrell islet, off the southern coast of Menorca
- Podarcis lilfordi colomi (Salvador, 1980) – Colomer islet, off northeast Menorca
- Podarcis lilfordi conejerae (L. Müller, 1927)
- Podarcis lilfordi espongicola (Salvador, 1979)
- Podarcis lilfordi estelicola (Salvador, 1979)
- Podarcis lilfordi fahrae (L. Müller, 1927)
- Podarcis lilfordi fenni (Eisentraut, 1928) – Sanitja islet, off northern Menorca
- Podarcis lilfordi gigliolii (Bedriaga, 1879) – Dragonera islet, off east of Mallorca
- Podarcis lilfordi hartmanni (Wettstein, 1937)
- Podarcis lilfordi hospitalis (Eisentraut, 1928)
- Podarcis lilfordi imperialensis (Salvador, 1979)
- Podarcis lilfordi isletasi (Hartmann, 1953)
- Podarcis lilfordi jordansi (L. Müller, 1927)
- Podarcis lilfordi kuligae (L. Müller, 1927)
- Podarcis lilfordi nigerrima (Salvador, 1979)
- Podarcis lilfordi planae (L. Müller, 1927)
- Podarcis lilfordi probae (Salvador, 1979)
- Podarcis lilfordi porrosicola Pérez-Mellado & Salvador, 1988 – Porros islet, north of Menorca
- Podarcis lilfordi rodriquezi (L. Müller, 1927) – Ratas Island lizard – Formerly Ratas Island, in Mahón's harbour (Menorca). Extinct after island was demolished in harbour expansion.
- Podarcis lilfordi sargantanae (Eisentraut, 1928) – islets located by the north coast of Mallorca (Sargantana, Ravells, Bledes and Tusqueta).
- Podarcis lilfordi toronis (Hartmann, 1953)
- Podarcis lilfordi xapaticola (Salvador, 1979)

Nota bene: A trinomial authority in parentheses indicates that the subspecies was originally described in genus other than Podarcis.
