= Liolaemus moradoensis =

Conservation status
- Least Concern (IUCN 3.1)

Scientific classification
- Kingdom: Animalia
- Phylum: Chordata
- Class: Reptilia
- Order: Squamata
- Suborder: Iguania
- Family: Liolaemidae
- Genus: Liolaemus
- Species: L. moradoensis

Binomial name
- Liolaemus moradoensis Hellmich, 1950

Species of lizard

Liolaemus moradoensis, the peak tree iguana, is a species of lizard in the family Iguanidae. It is found in Chile.
