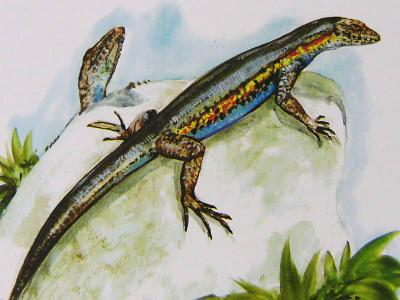

Conservation status
- Extinct (1950)

Scientific classification
- Domain: Eukaryota
- Kingdom: Animalia
- Phylum: Chordata
- Class: Reptilia
- Order: Squamata
- Family: Lacertidae
- Genus: Podarcis
- Species: P. lilfordi
- Subspecies: †P. l. rodriquezi

Trinomial name
- †Podarcis lilfordi rodriquezi (Müller, 1927)

= Ratas Island lizard =

Extinct subspecies of lizard

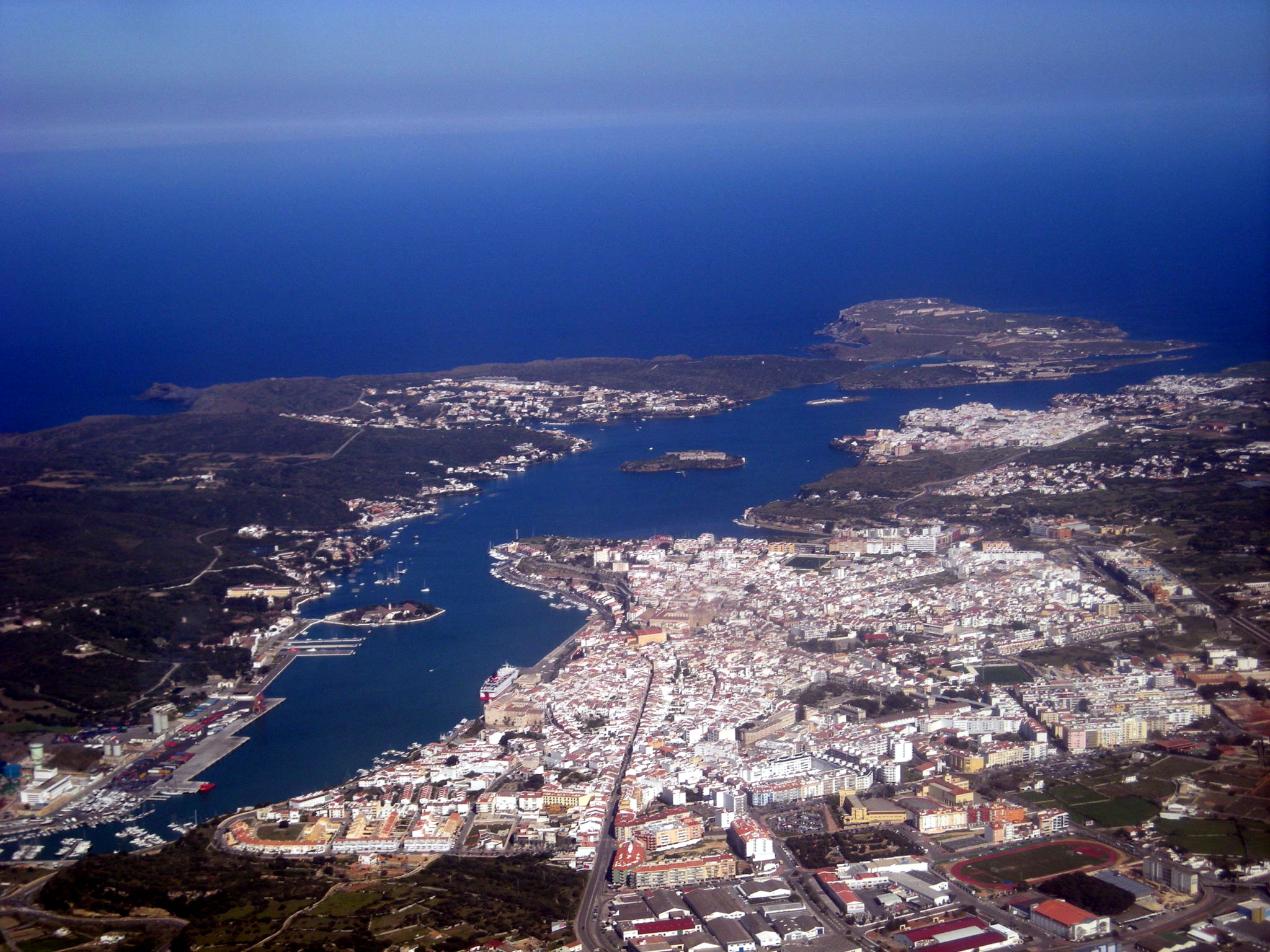
Ratas Island was located between the Isla del Rey (in the center of the photo) and the southern shore (to its right)

The Ratas Island lizard, Podarcis lilfordi rodriquezi, is an extinct subspecies of Lilford's wall lizard that once lived on Ratas Island, a tiny, rocky island in the bay of Mahón, Menorca (Spain). But Ratas island, which was its habitat, was destroyed when Port Mahon was rebuilt. The last sign of this subspecies was in 1950 and is presumed extinct. Four specimens of this European lizard are conserved in museum collections.

== See also ==
- List of extinct animals of Europe
