= Sant Elm =

Town in Andrach, Spain

Coordinates: 39°34′54″N 2°21′1″E

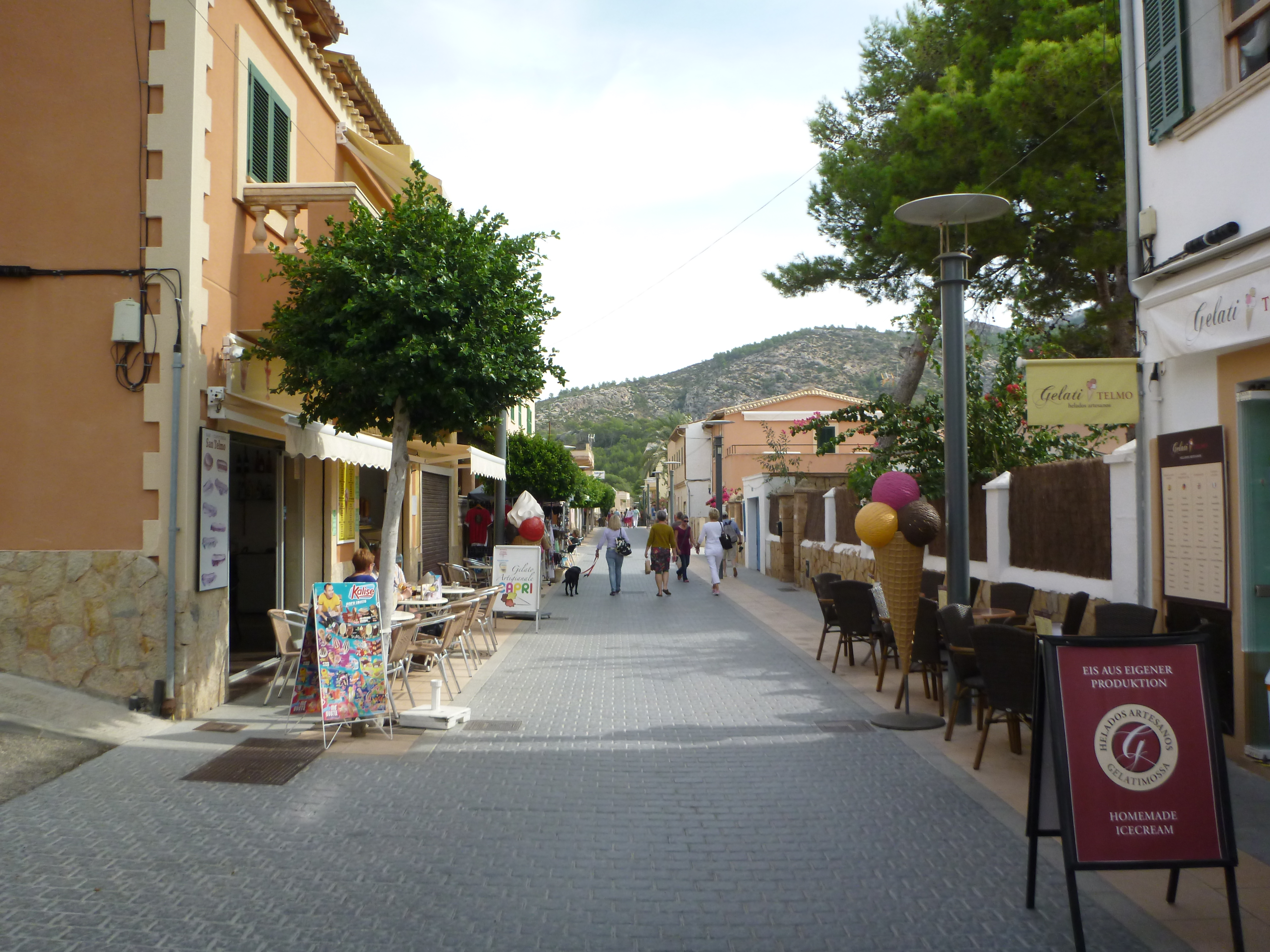
Pedestrian zone of Sant Elm

Sant Elm (Catalan pronunciation: [ˈsant ˈɛlm]) is a town on the south-west coast of Mallorca in the Balearic Islands of Spain. It lies in the municipality of Andratx.

It is a picturesque fishing village at the far Southwest corner of Mallorca, only a short drive from Andratx and Port D'Andratx. About 300 meters off the plage is the uninhabited island of Pantaleu, about 600 meters is another uninhabited island Sa Mitjana, and more offshore the island and nature reserve of Dragonera can be found.

Although a sleepy village, with a variety of apartments and villas, there are also several restaurants of excellent quality.
