= Camp de Mar, Mallorca =

Resort village in Andratx, Mallorca, Spain

Coordinates: 39°32′15.3″N 2°25′18.0″E

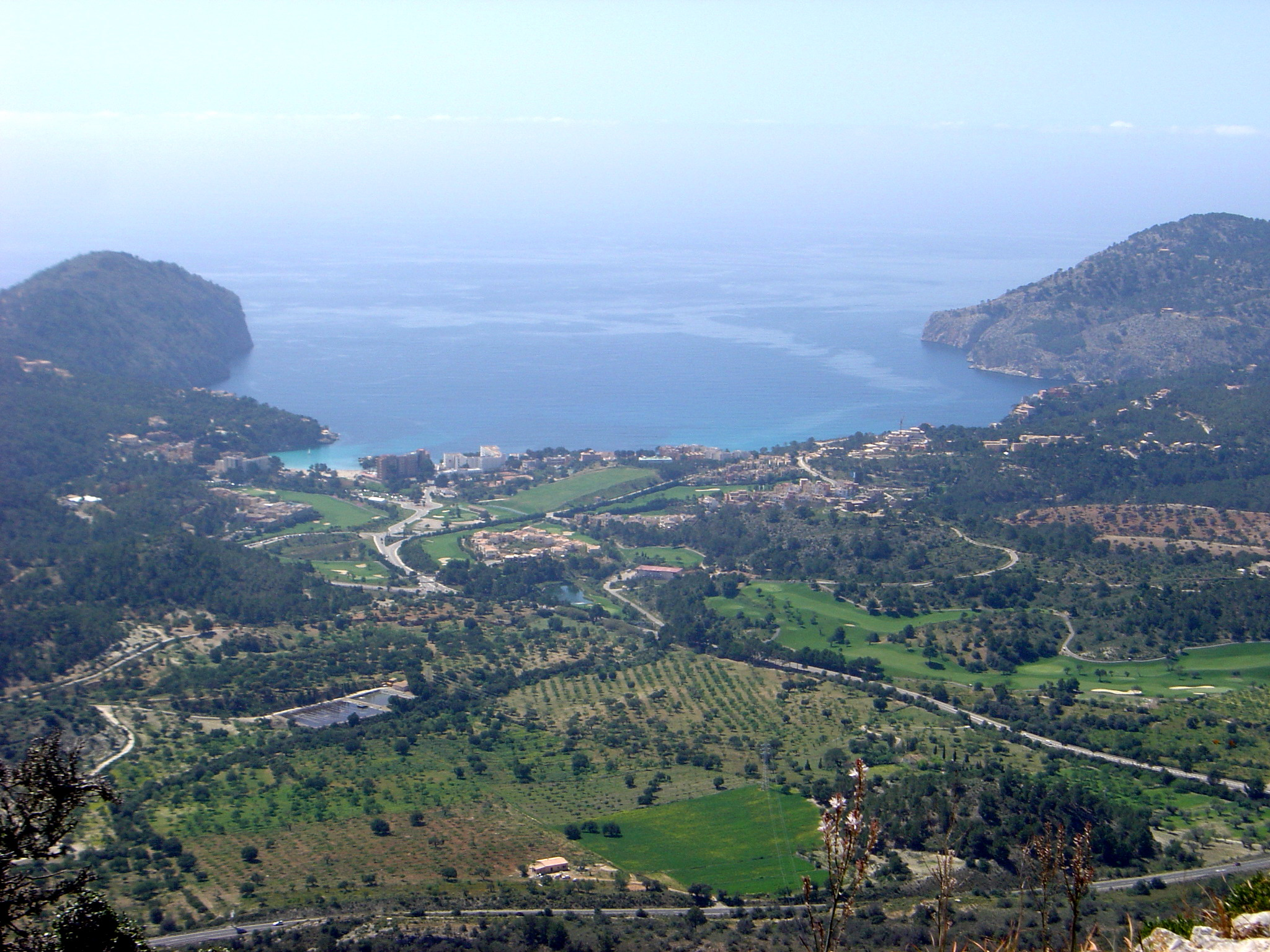
View of the resort from the north

Camp de Mar is a small resort village in the municipality of Andratx on the Spanish Balearic Island of Mallorca. The resort is 20 miles (32 km) west of the island main airport of Son Sant Joan Airport. The resort's beach has been awarded a blue flag.

== Description ==
The resort is in a sheltered bay which is enclosed by high cliffs. There is a small sandy beach with a profusion of rocks, making it an ideal place for snorkeling. Just off the shore there is a small island, which can be reached by bridge, on which there is a popular restaurant.

== Activities ==
In the countryside surrounding the resort there are six championship golf courses. The course nearest to the resort is the 18-hole Golf de Andratx, next door to the Steigenberger Golf & Spa Resort Camp de Mar
