= Dragonera =

- Island
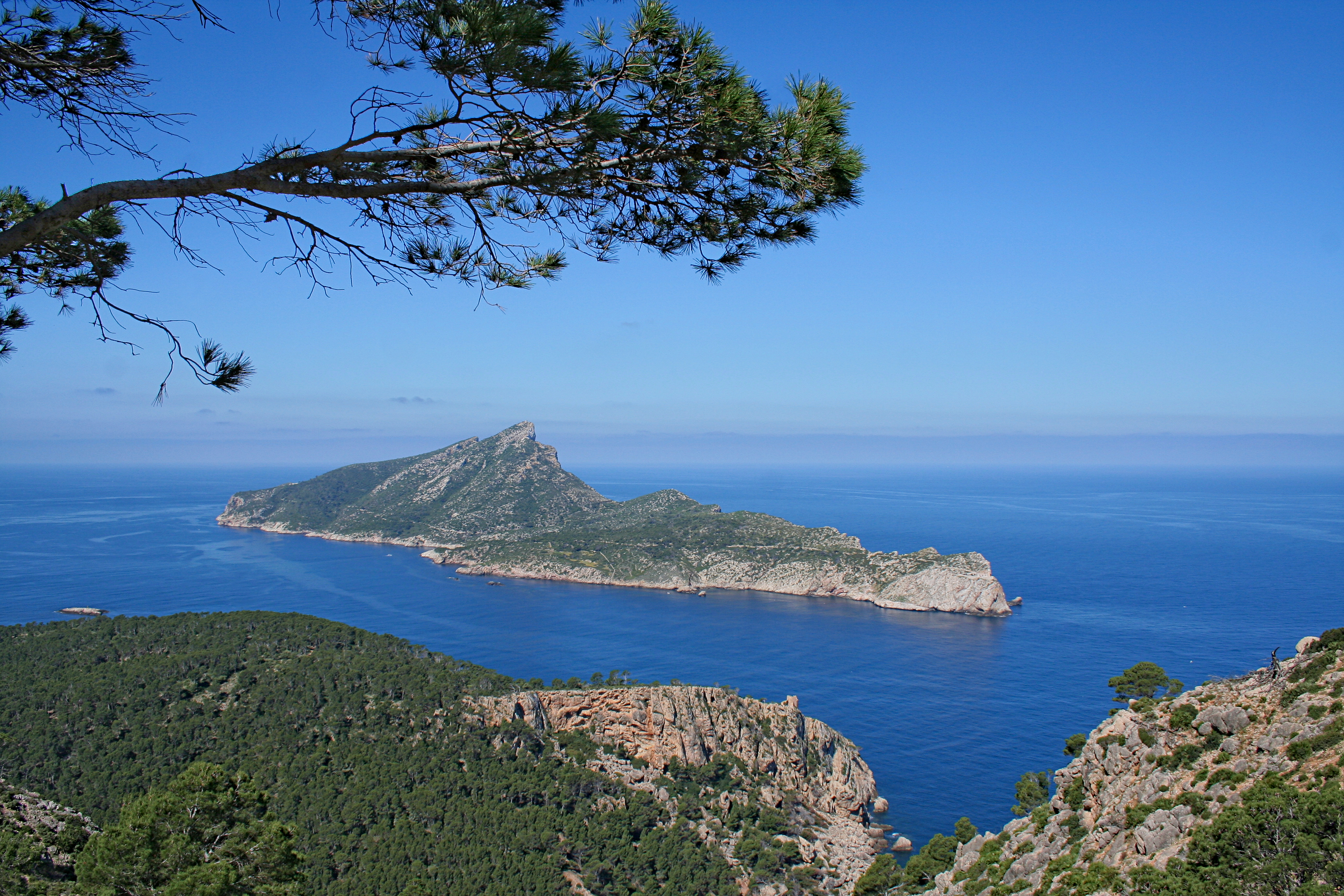
- View of Sa Dragonera from nearby Mallorca

- Location in Spain
- Coordinates: 39°35′02″N 02°19′17″E
- Country: Spain
- Autonomous community: Balearic Islands
- Council: Consell Insular de Mallorca
- Municipality: Andratx

Area
  - Total: 2.88 km^{2} (1.11 sq mi)
- Highest elevation: 360 m (1,180 ft)

Population (2009)
  - Total: no permanent population
- Time zone: UTC+1 (CET)
  - Summer (DST): UTC+2 (CEST)

Dragonera (Balearic Catalan: [dɾəɣoˈneɾə]; Spanish: [dɾaɣoˈneɾa]; lit. 'dragon island'), also called Sa Dragonera, is an uninhabited islet in the Balearic Islands, Spain, located just off the west coast of Mallorca. It is declared a natural park, Parc Natural Sa Dragonera.

== Geography ==
Geologically speaking, Dragonera is an emerged part of the geologic system running southwest-northeast in the Iberian Peninsula. It runs from the Málaga province through Cap de la Nau and then gets submerged under the Mediterranean Sea. It surfaces again to form the island of Ibiza, the Tramuntana Range in the island of Mallorca and Sa Dragonera itself. The silhouette of the mountain range vaguely resembles a dragon, hence its name.

Dragonera is approximately 3,200 metres in length and has a maximum width of 500 metres. Although its highest hill Pico Popi is only 360 metres high, the island's overall relief is very abrupt, especially considering its small size, which made the islet of little importance in historic times.

The island is a part of the municipality of Andratx, which is, along with Sant Elm (both in nearby Mallorca), the closest towns to the island.

Dragonera has a small natural port in the Cala Lladó area.

== History ==
The name of Dragonera comes from Dragon that was associated to the shape that the island has from a specific perspective, and from the large number of endemic Lilford's wall lizards.

There is an Ancient Roman necropolis in the Es Lladó area, but there are no other signs of historical permanent settling.

During the 18th century, two defensive watchtowers were built on the island in order to watch for the numerous Barbary pirates operating in the area.

In 1910 the lighthouses of Tramuntana (north) and Llebeig (southwest) began to operate, replacing the Faro Viejo or old lighthouse, which was built in a lower part of the island, in an area often surrounded by mist.

In 1941 Juan Flexas bought the islet and started farming activities in the Es Lladó area.

By the mid 20th century, the islet was often used by estraperlo smugglers for their illegal activities.

Between 1960 and 1975 the lighthouses were improved and became automatic, which meant that the only permanent and tiny population (that of the lighthouse keeper and family) left the islet.

In 1974 the islet was bought by a Spanish company in order to build a touristic resort. The original plan included a luxury residential, an hotel, a casino and, to serve all these, a manmade port. These plans were heavily contested by the ecologist movements and a harsh and long legal battle followed. The ecologists managed to get all the plans on hold until the legal controversy was cleared. It only finished ten years after, in 1984, when the Audiencia Nacional finally barred any building activities on the uninhabited islet.

Part of the 1982 film adapting Agatha Christie's mystery Evil Under the Sun was shot in Dragonera, presented as an island of the fictional Tyrania by the Adriatic.

Then, in 1987, the Consell Insular de Mallorca bought the islet. In 1995 the Balearic regional Government declared the islet to have natural park status along with the nearby islets of Pantaleu and Isla Mediana.

Dragonera is the island referred to as "Dragon Island" in chapter eight of Patrick O'Brian's historical novel Master and Commander.

== Gallery ==
View of the dragon island at different times and under different atmospheric conditions

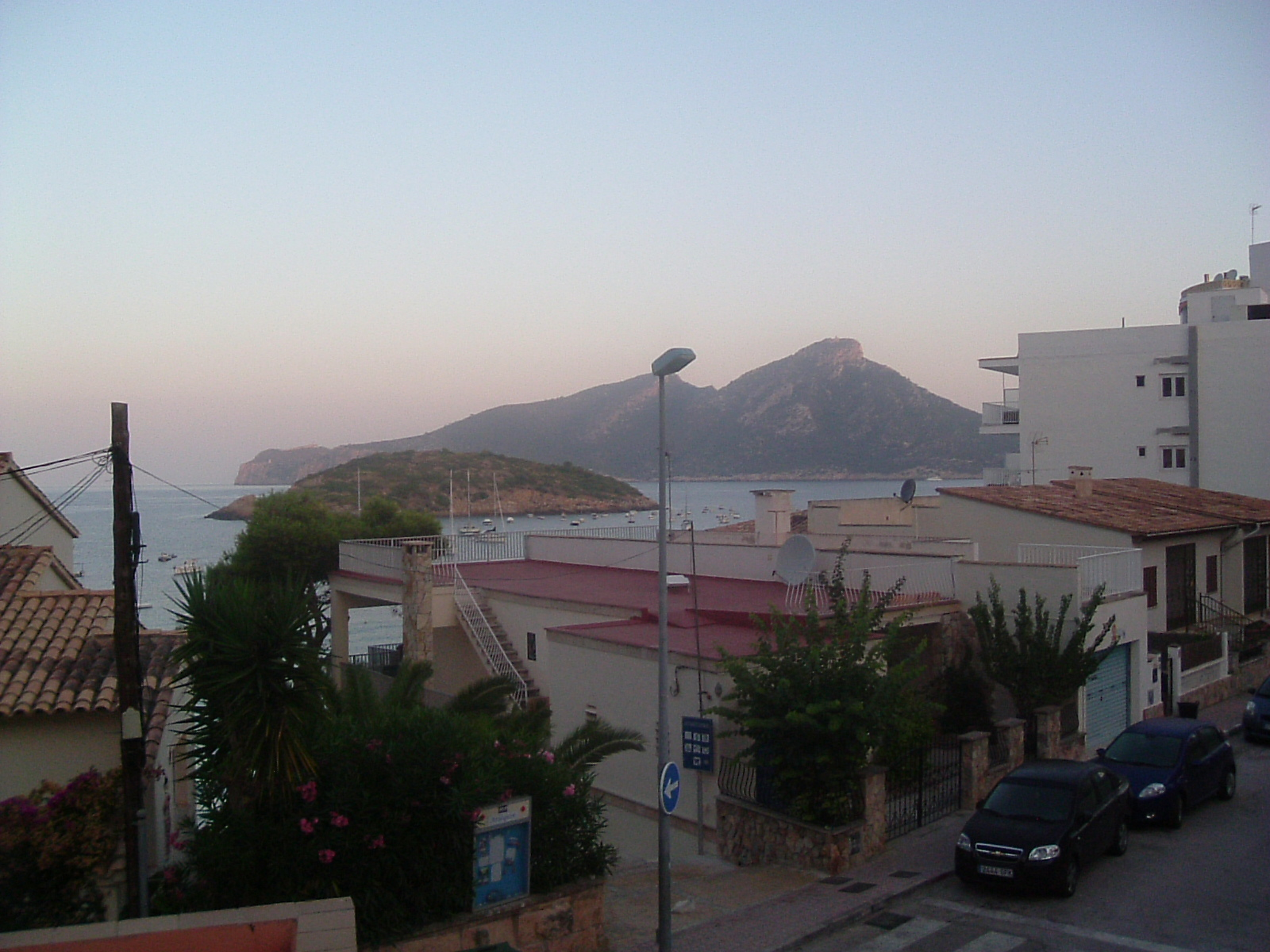

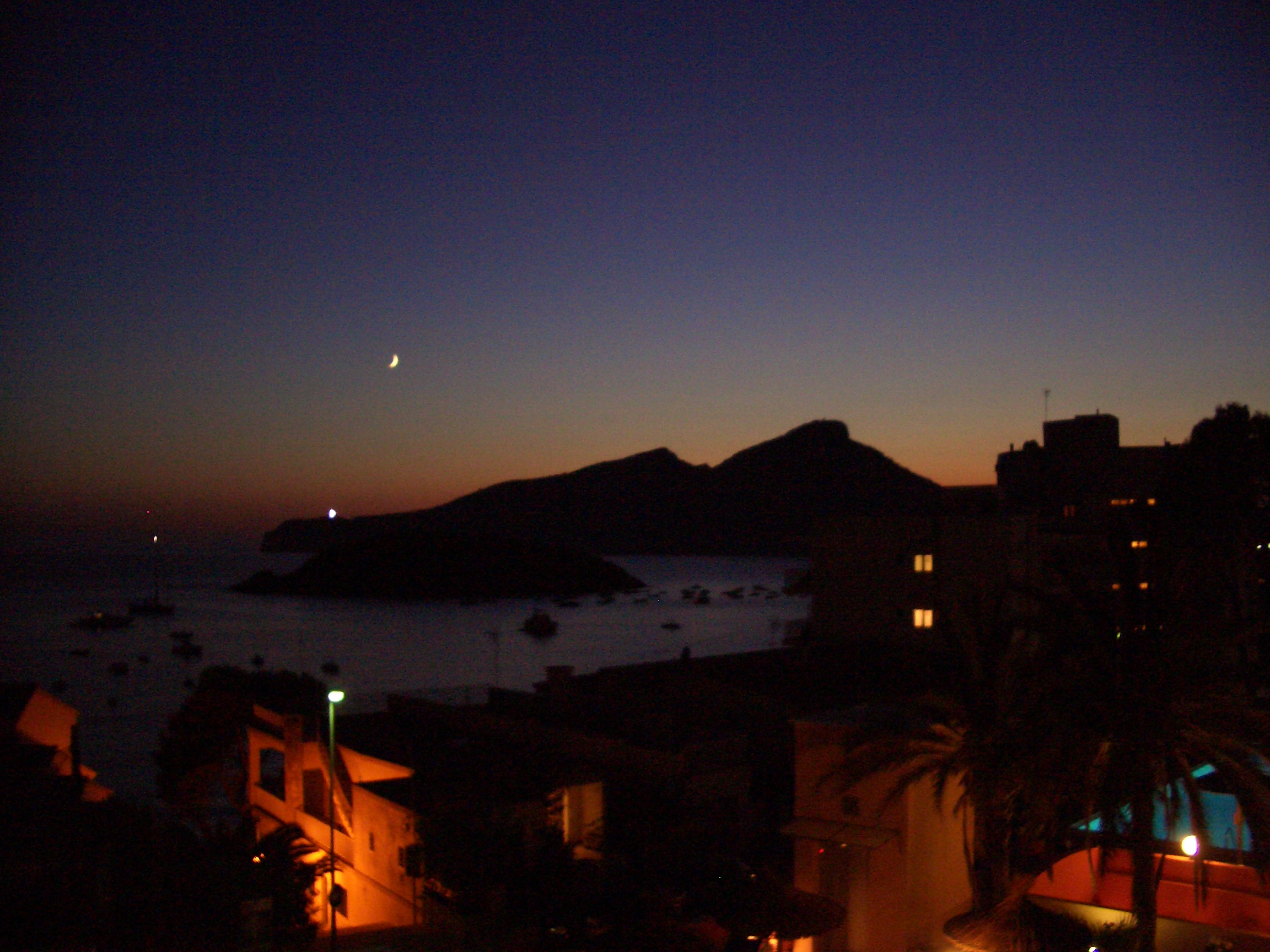

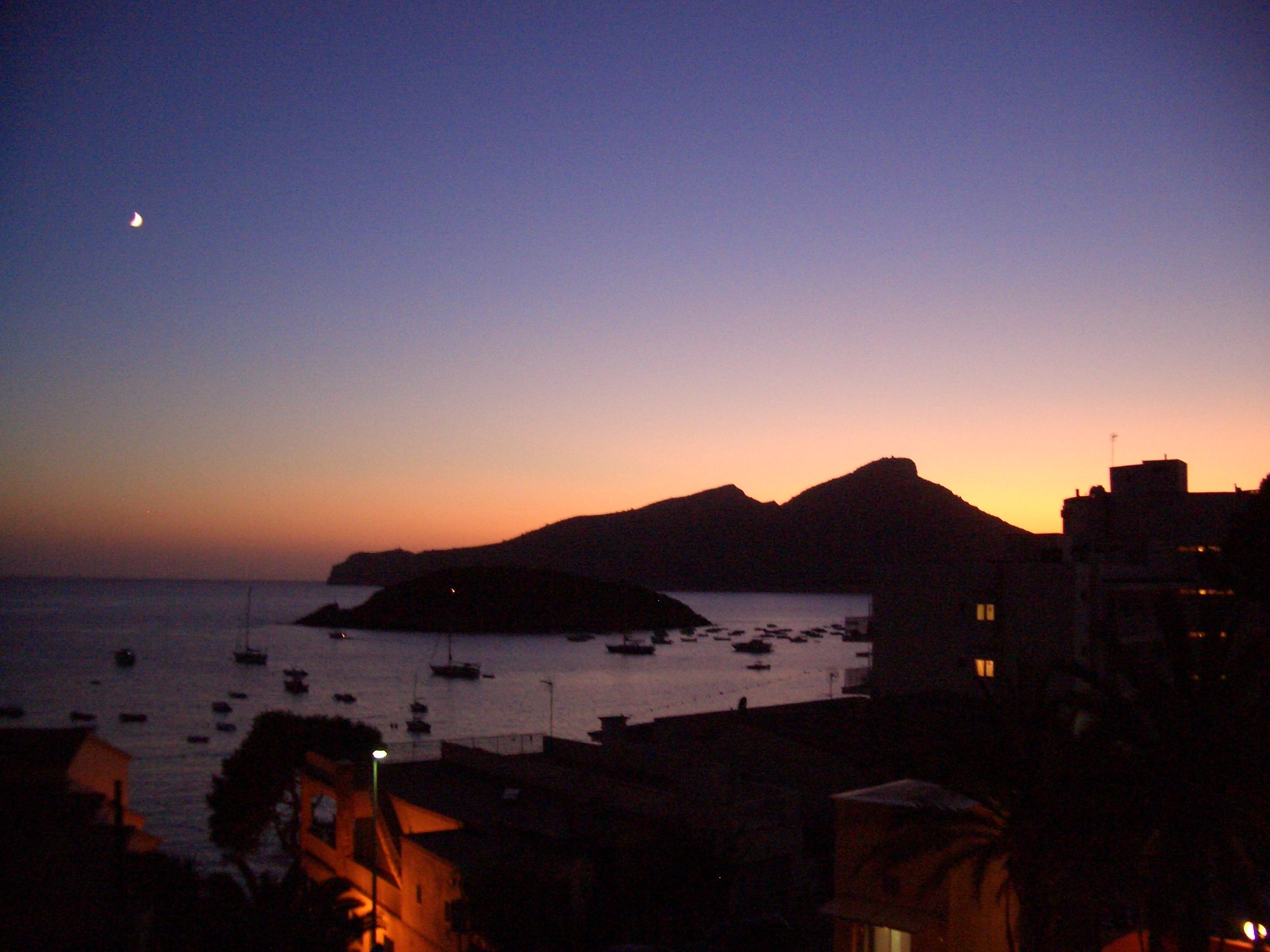

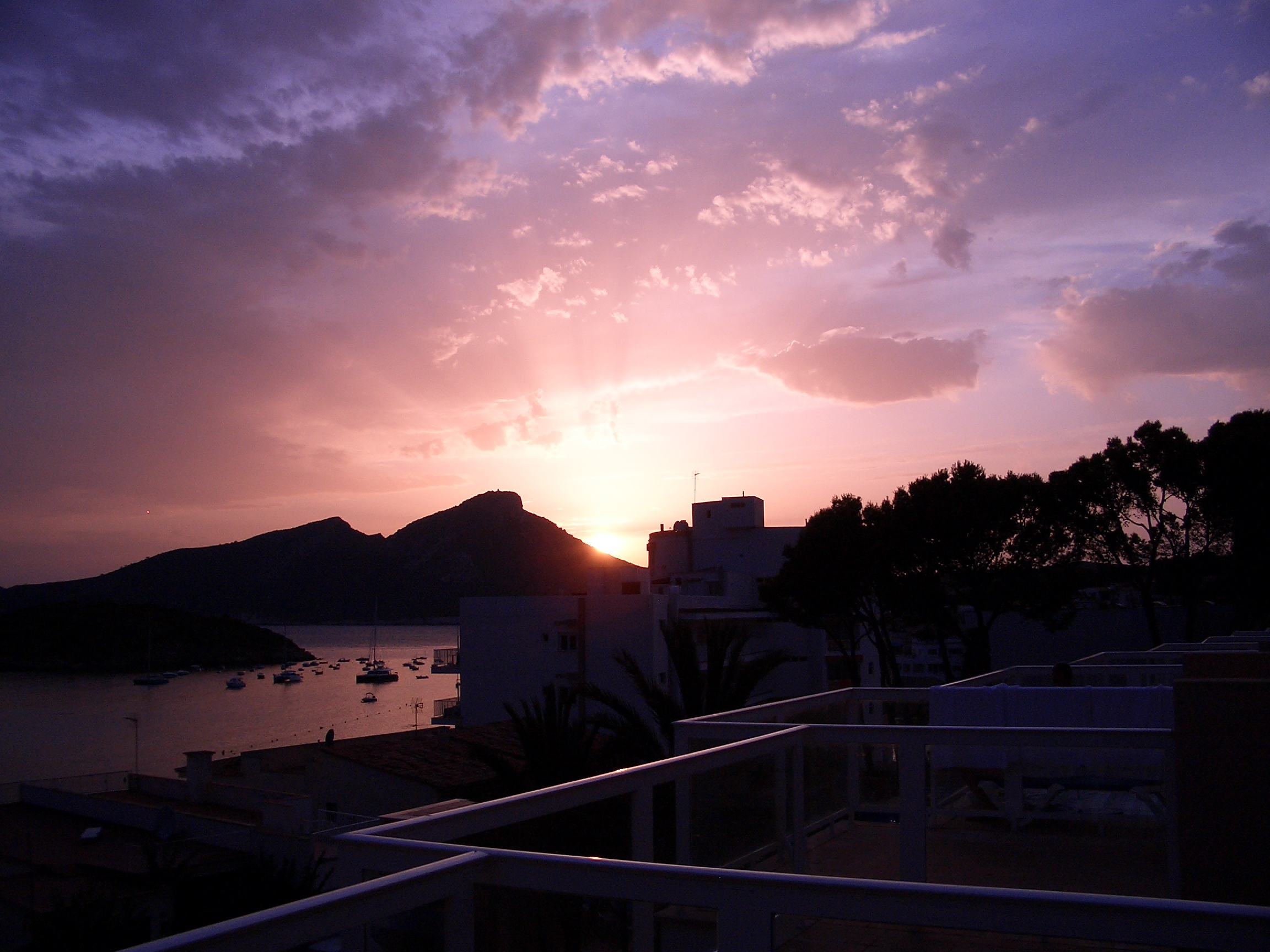

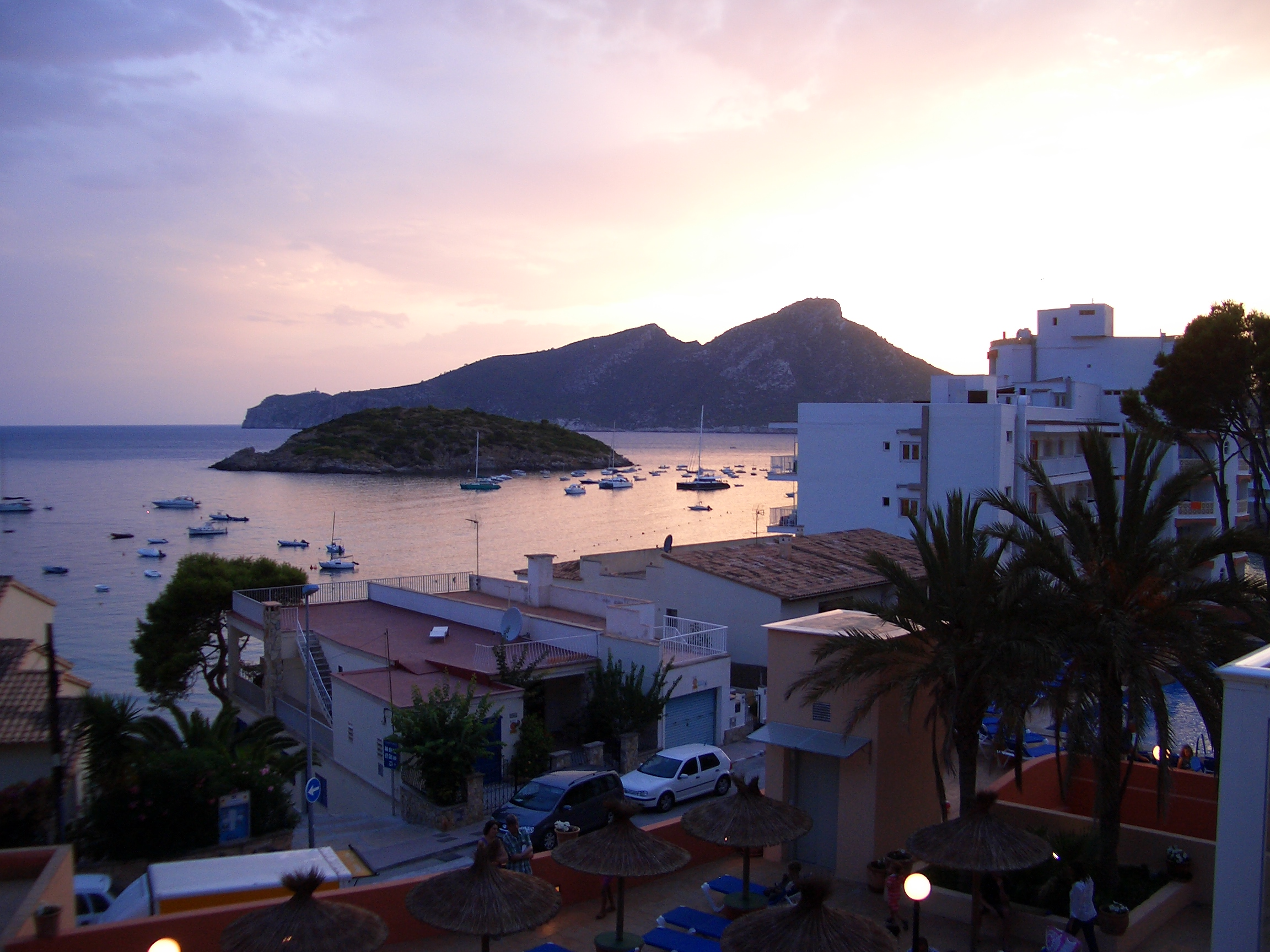
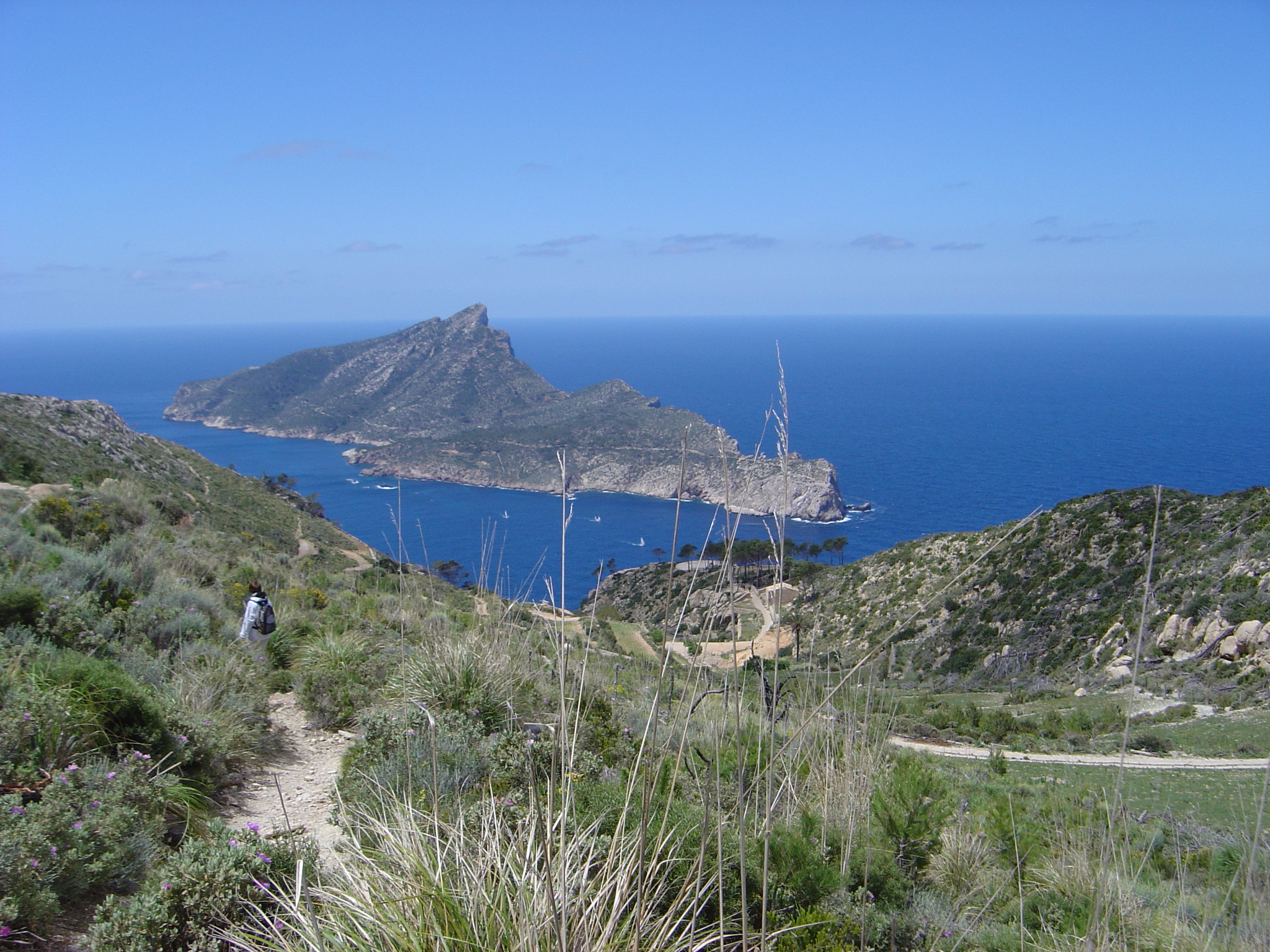
Dragonera as seen from the Tramuntana Range in Mallorca.

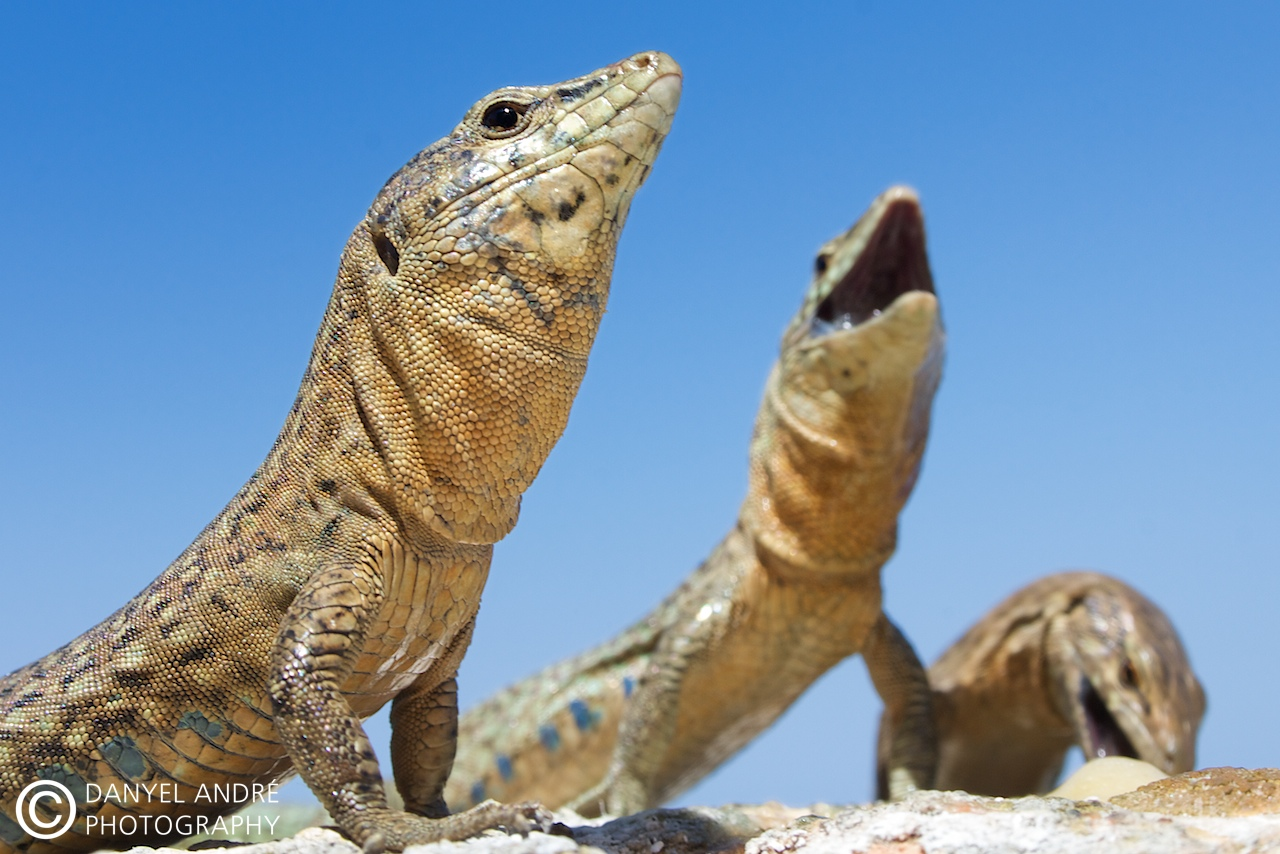
Endemic lizard
of Dragonera
(Podarcis lilfordi)

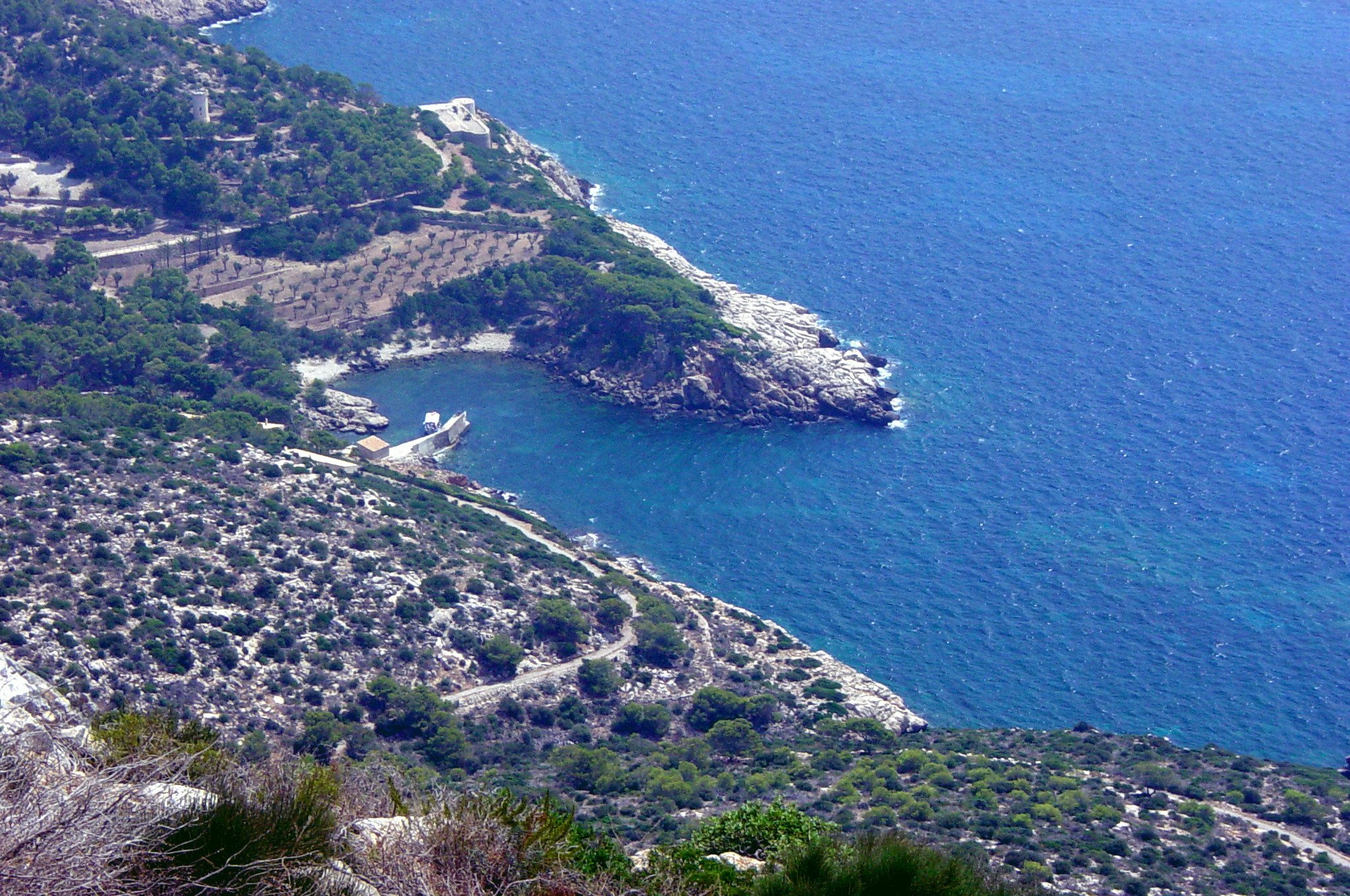
Cala Lladó is the islet's tiny natural harbor
