= Andratx =

- Municipality
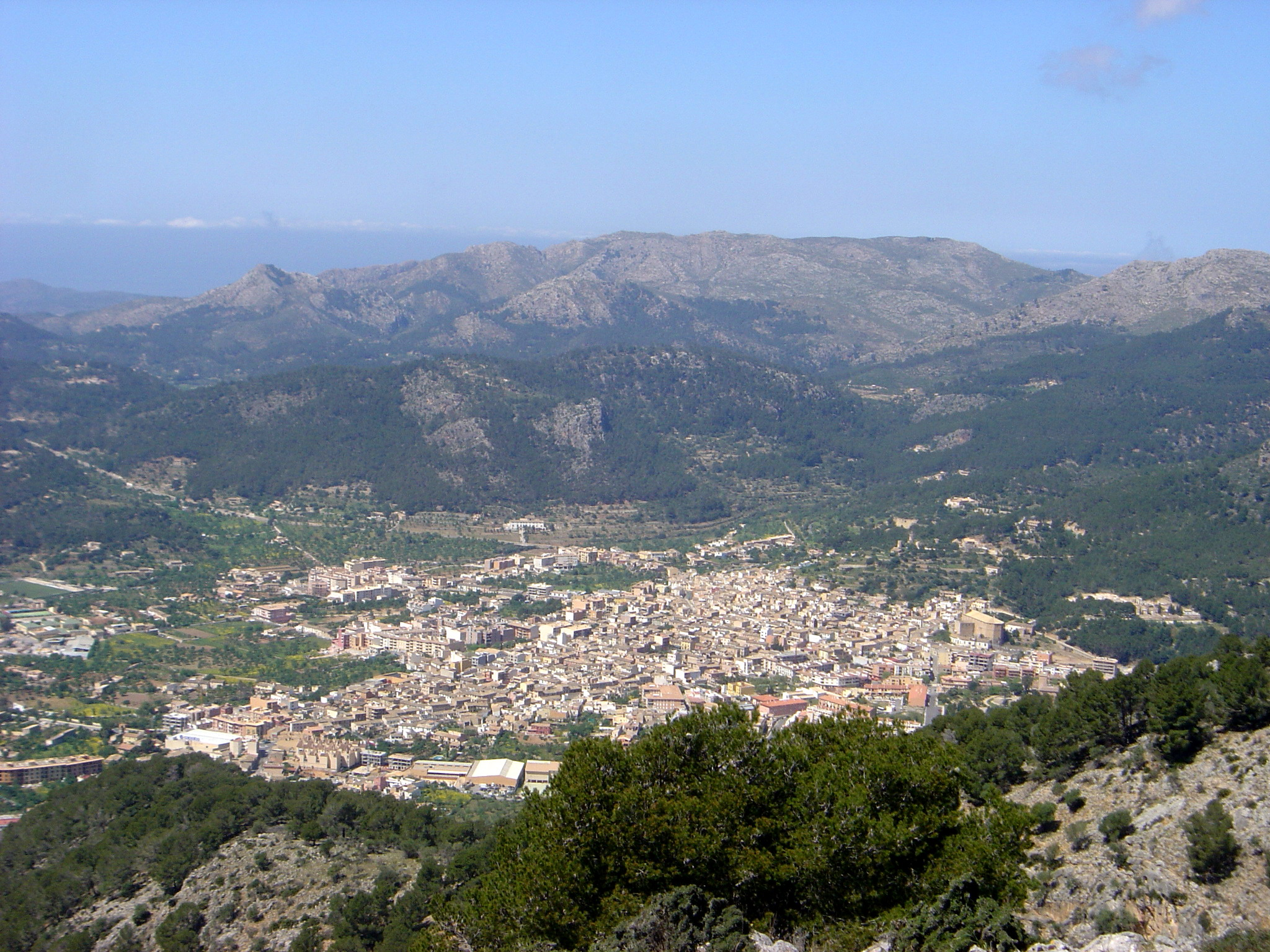
- Town of Andratx

- Coat of arms

- Andratx shown within Mallorca

- Location in Mallorca Andratx (Balearic Islands) Andratx (Spain)
- Coordinates: 39°34′15″N 2°25′17″E
- Sovereign state: Spain
- Autonomous community: Balearic Islands
- Province: Balearic Islands
- Island: Mallorca
- Comarca: Serra de Tramuntana
- Administrative HQ: Andratx

Government
  - Type: Municipal corporation
  - Body: Ajuntament d'Andratx
  - Mayor: Katia Rouarch

Area
  - Total: 81.46 km^{2} (31.45 sq mi)

Population (2025-01-01)
  - Total: 12,195
  - Density: 149.7/km^{2} (387.7/sq mi)
- Time zone: UTC+1 (Central European Time)
  - Summer (DST): UTC+2 (Central European Summer Time)
- Website: www.andratx.cat

Andratx (Balearic Catalan: [ənˈdɾatʃ]) is a municipality on Mallorca, one of the Balearic Islands, along the Mediterranean east coast of Spain. It is located on the western tip of the island.

Port d'Andratx, located a few miles south of Andratx, is an exclusive resort.

== History ==
The town of Andratx is ancient and until recently was mainly inhabited by local Majorcan people. The area was occupied by the Romans, who called the town Andrachium, in the 2nd century BC and pottery and coins found there give evidence of this. The town was built inland from the coast as a precaution against the constant threat of raids from Barbary pirates. In the 16th century a system of observation towers was erected on the island as a means of protection against pirates. From 14 towers in the municipalities of Andratx and Calvià, 12 still exist. The municipality also includes the towns of Port d'Andratx, Sa Coma, S'Arracó, Sant Elm and Camp de Mar. It also includes the uninhabited islet Sa Dragonera.

The municipality has undergone a transformation since 2004, following the input of EU finance which has resulted in a facelift for the town and also brought in foreign investment.

== Geography ==
Andratx municipality is located in the southwestern corner of the Sierra de Tramontana, the most significant mountains of the island of Majorca.

In the southern part are a number of valleys, which are the most densely populated areas. The northern part of the municipality is mountainous and rugged, and is virtually uninhabited. The highest point is at 927 metres.

Off the coast of the municipality is the islet of Sa Dragonera, declared a Natural Park in 1995. It can be accessed by sea from Puerto de Andratx or Sant Elm.

== Economy ==
The main activity in Andratx today is tourism. Agriculture and fishing as a means of livelihood have declined considerably, and is mostly practiced now for private consumption and recreation purposes. The main crops are almonds, carob, figs and citrus fruit and grapes producing "Santa Catarina" wine.

== Demographics ==
Demographic evolution
1900	1910	1920	1930	1940	1950	1960	1970	1981	1991	2001	2005	2007
6,516	6,262	6,113	5,778	5,077	3,768	4,113	6,043	6,336	6,869	9,034	9,906	10,939

Throughout the twentieth century the population gradually declined to a low in the 1950s. Since then the population has been recovering steadily except in 1960 when the population increased by 2,000 people. In the early twenty-first century the pace of growth has accelerated again. with 2,200 new inhabitants between 2001 and 2005 and increasing urban pressure on the environment, especially in the capital-population centers Andratx and Puerto de Andratx.

Andratx is one of the municipalities of Mallorca with the highest percentage of foreign residents. According to the 2001 census about 15% of the population was foreign and among them 43% were EU nationals, including roughly 15% German, 15% British and 10% French.

== Art ==
The main monuments in the municipality are Church of Santa Maria de Andrach, Iglesia de la Virgen del Carmen del Puerto de Andratx, Church of s'Arracó, the Castell de Son Mas (Now City Hall), the Andratx Castle, and the former Trappist monastery, now in ruins. The legendary Teatro Argentino, dating back to 1912, belongs to former symbols of the municipality that have disappeared.

Contemporary art is shown in the CCA Andrax Cultural Center (Centro Cultural Andratx), in Sa Coma, north of Andratx; in the Sa Taronja Cultural Association, west of Andratx; in the Liedtke Museum in the Port; and in the Studio Weil.

== Notable people ==
- Stephen Gately (1976–2009), singer
- Guy Hamilton (1922–2016), film director; married to the (below) Kerima
- Peter Hook (born 1956), musician (Joy Division, New Order)
- Kerima (1925–2014), actress; married to the above Guy Hamilton
- Mark Lawrenson (born 1957), footballer and broadcaster
- John Noakes (1934–2017), television presenter
- Baltasar Porcel (1937–2009), novelist
- José Luis de Vilallonga (1920–2007), actor

== Gallery ==
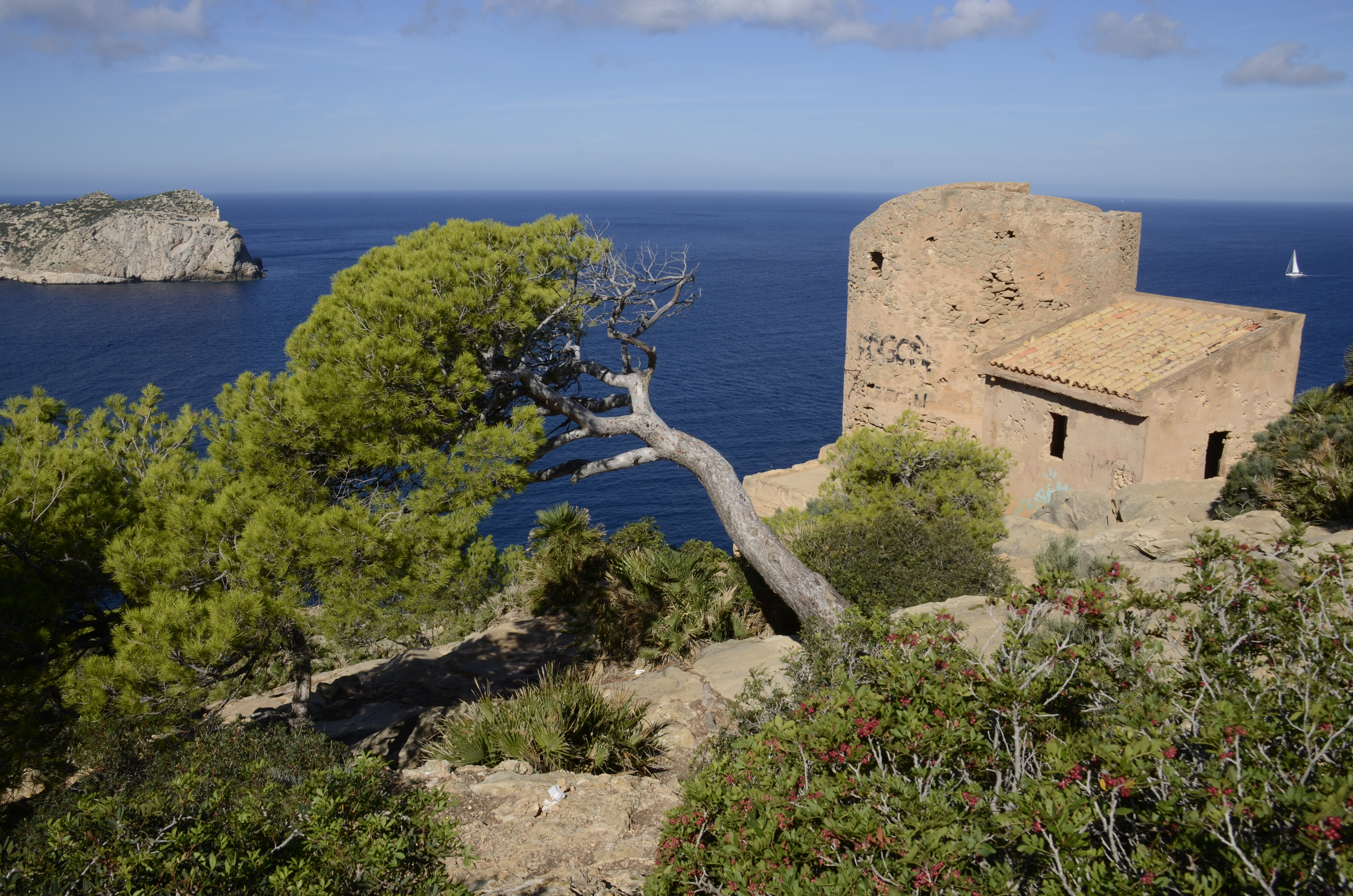
Torre de Cala en Basset near Sant Elm

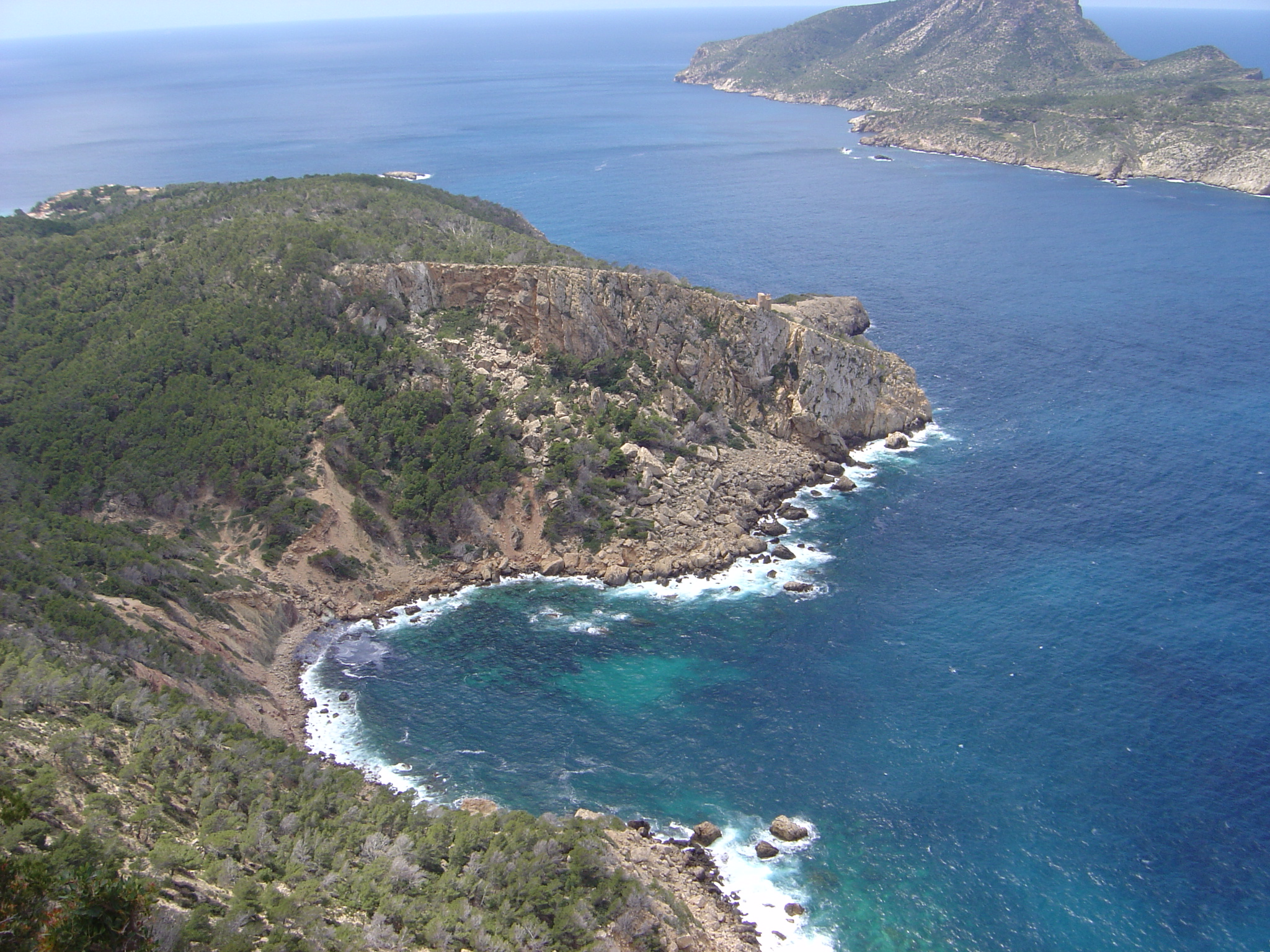
Cala en basset

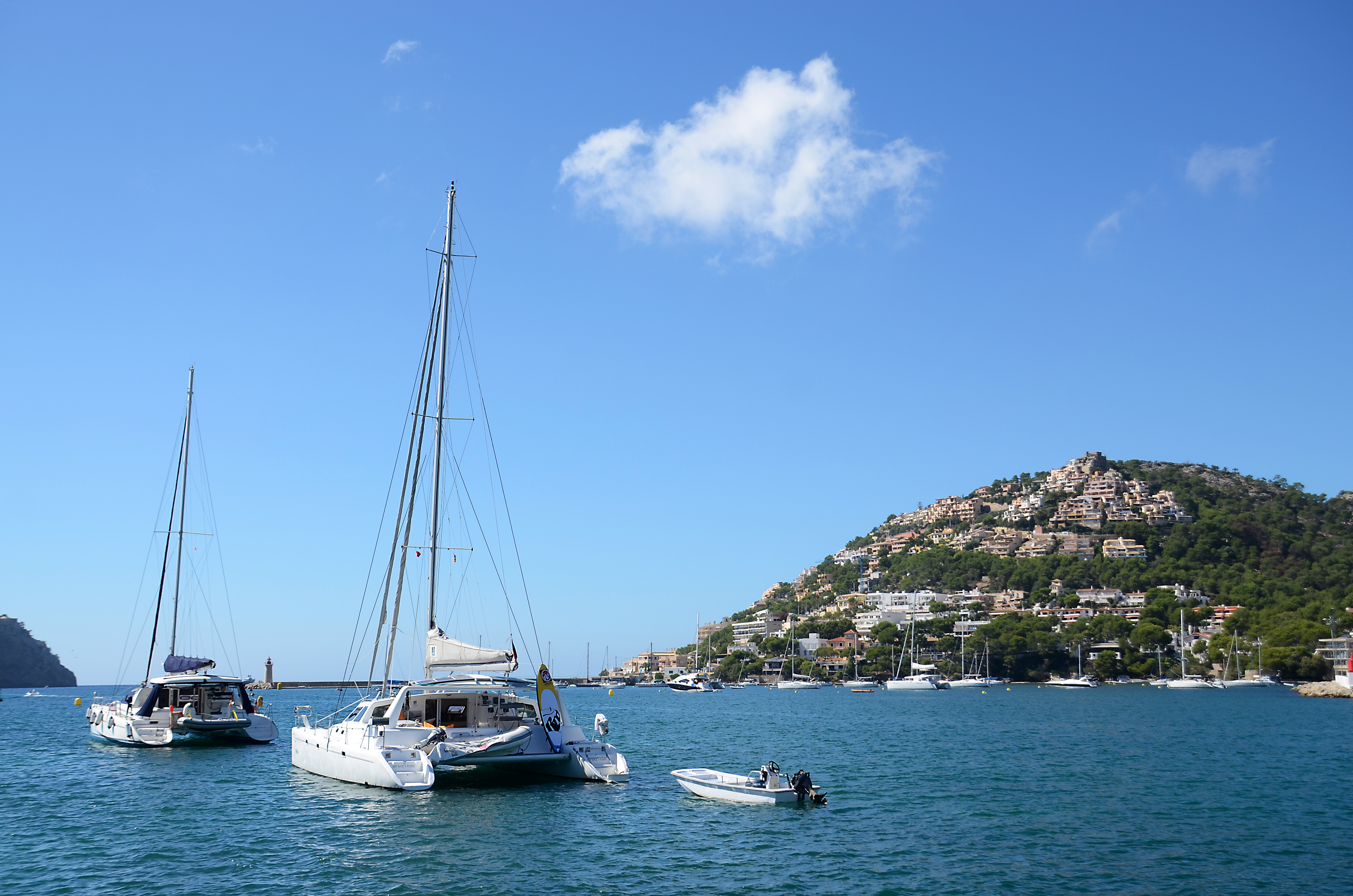
Port d'Andratx

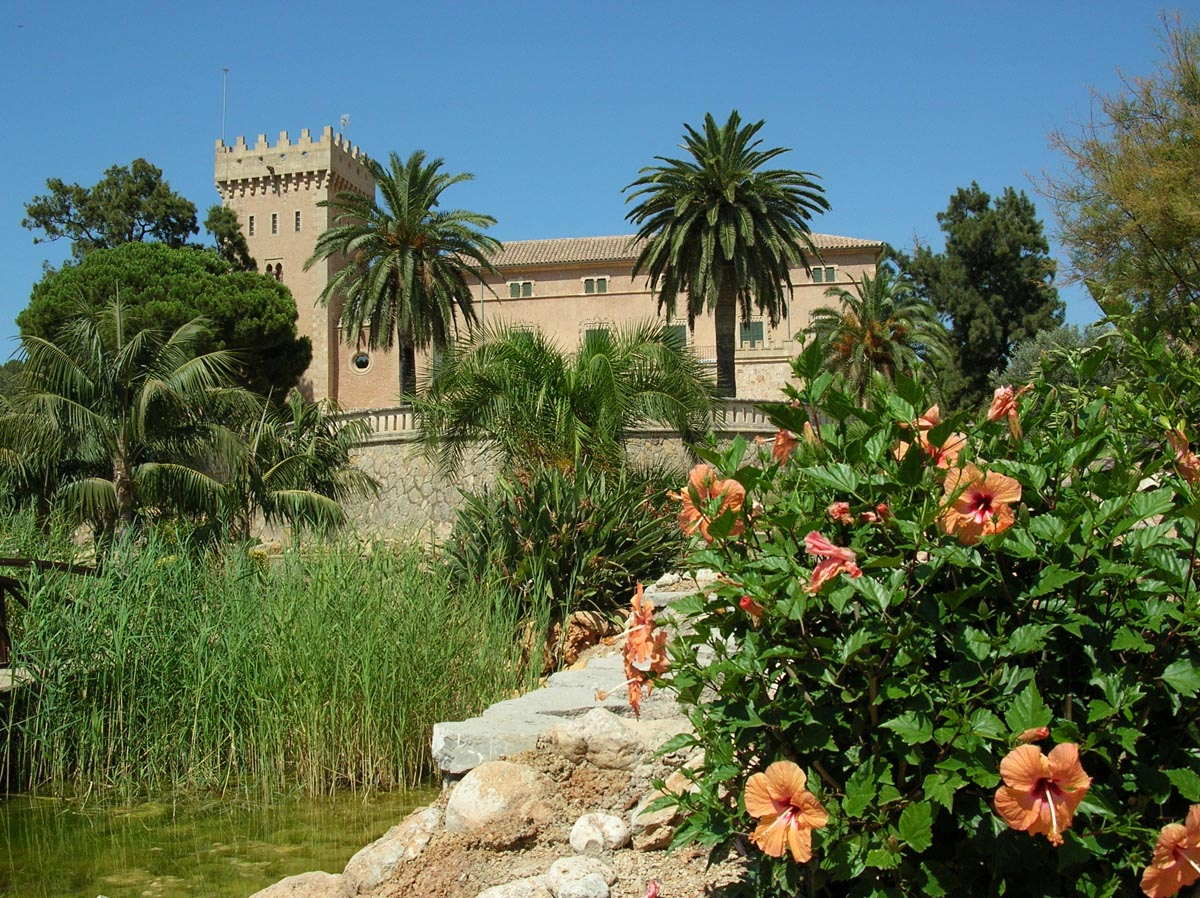
Castle of Andratx

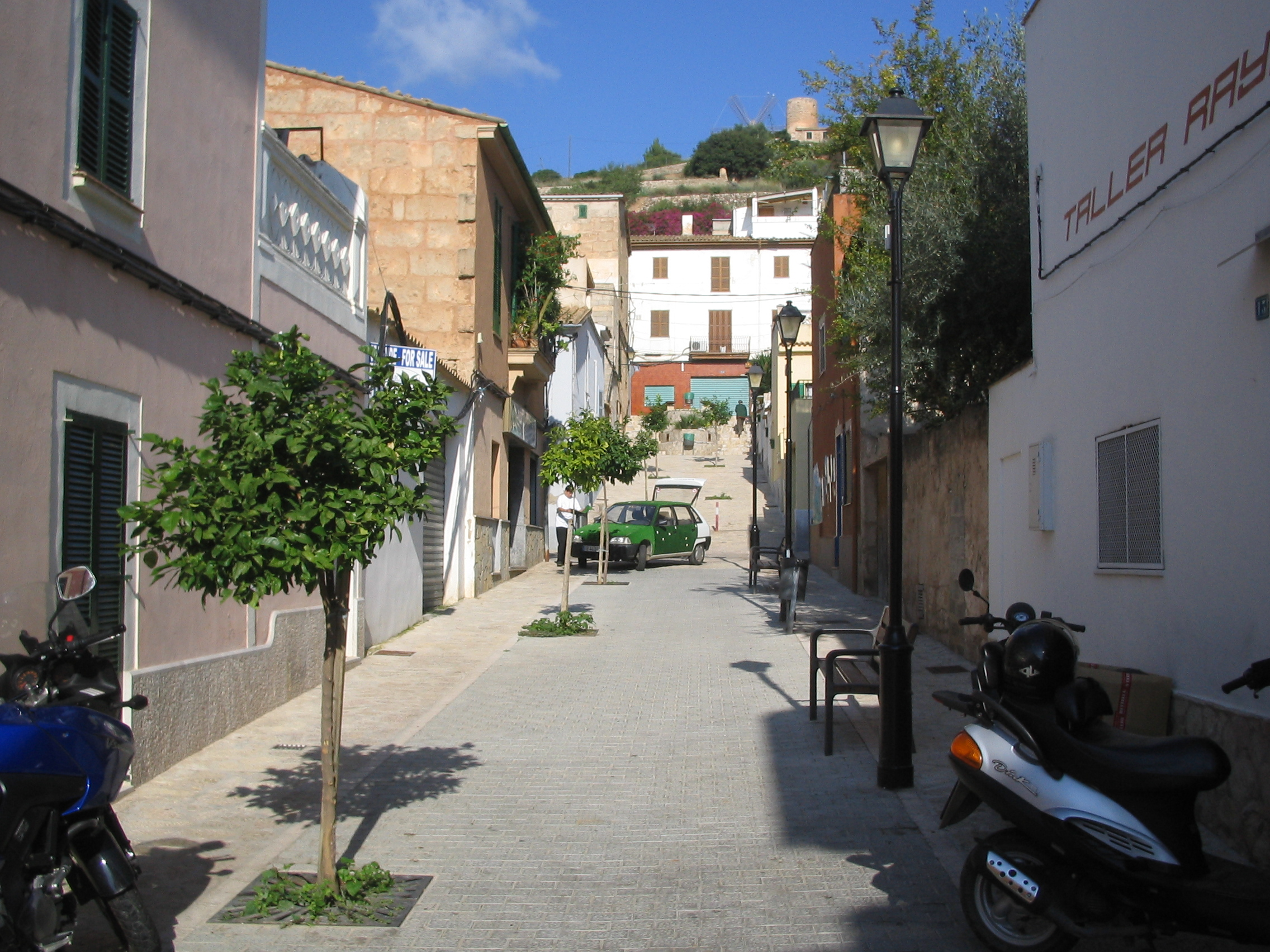
The town centre

== See also ==
- List of municipalities in Balearic Islands
