= Lorenz Müller =

German herpetologist

- Born: 18 February 1868; Mainz
- Died: February 1, 1953 (aged 84); Munich
- Occupation: herpetologist

Lorenz Müller (18 February 1868 in Mainz – 1 February 1953 in Munich) was a German herpetologist.

Professor Lorenz Müller was known for his studies on the Balearic Islands species of the genus Podarcis (wall lizards) during the 1920s, in which he described several new subspecies, including the now extinct Ratas Island lizard, Podarcis lilfordi rodriquezi.

Together with his colleague Professor Robert Mertens he made several studies about European amphibians and reptiles.

Lorenz Müller died at 84 from a bronchitis.

A species of South American lizard, Liolaemus lorenzmuelleri, is named in his honor.

== Works ==
- Mertens R, Müller L (1928). "Liste der Amphibien und Reptilien Europas ". Abh. Senckenb. Naturf. Ges. 41 (1): 1-62. (in German).
- Müller L (1923). "Über neue und seltene Mittel- und Südamerikanische Amphibien und Reptilien ". (in German).
