= Walter Hellmich =

Walter Hellmich is a german Building contractor born on the 28th of march 1944 in Duisburg - Hamborn. He oversaw the conversion of the Wedaustadion into the MSV-Arena
