= Cala Tuent =

Cala Tuent is a bay with a stony beach in the northwest of the Balearic island of Mallorca. It is located in the municipality of Escorca below the Puig Major, which at 1,445 metres is the highest mountain in the Tramuntana mountain range. With its charming setting, it is considered one of the most beautiful bays along the Tramuntana coast.

== Location and Description ==
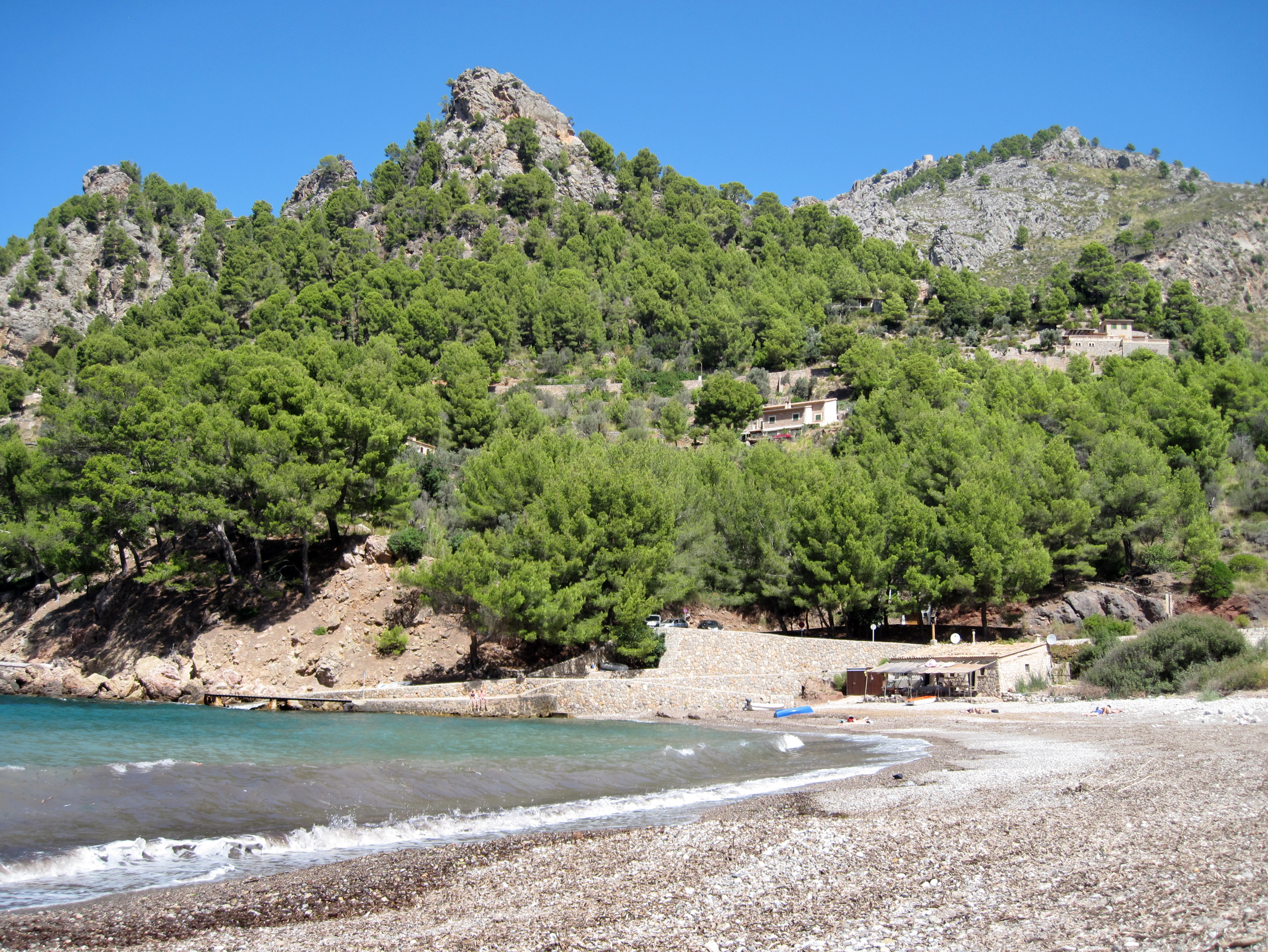
North side with fisherman's house

The Cala Tuent lies between the two headlands Morro des Forat and Penyal Foradat. The beach of Cala Tuent, the Platja de Tuent, has a length of 180 metres and an average width of 55 metres. Pebbles, stones and small sandy areas alternate. Due to the elongated stretch of water of the sea inlet, there is moderate wave movement within the bay. The water quality is excellent. Outside the marked swimming area there are colder currents, some of which are strong. The bay is not supervised by lifeguards. Boat traffic is minimal.

On the sides of the steep mountain slopes, a few houses stand in the pine forest surrounding the bay. The building of a former restaurant in the middle of the beach was demolished after a prolonged period of vacancy. The mountain stream Torrent de sa Coma flows into the Cala Tuent; it is a confluence of the two non-perennial mountain streams Torrent de s'Al·lot Mort and Torrent des Gorg des Diners, which rises directly at the summit of the Puig Major.There is a boat connection from Port de Sóller into the bay.

In recent years, Cala Tuent has established itself as a retreat destination, with the retreat center Finca Higo and its direct beach access offering Pilates and yoga retreats. In particular, the small pier is often used for practice sessions early in the morning, offering a stunning view of the bay and the mountains.

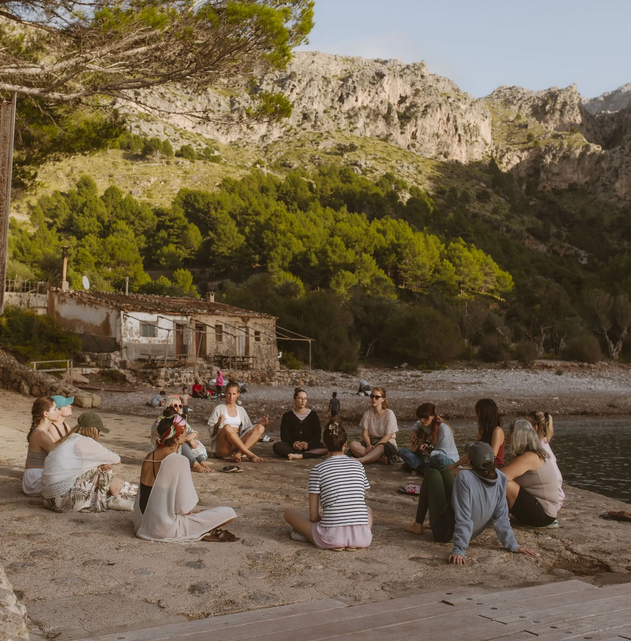
Retreat group forming a seated circle on the beach.
