= Gorg Blau =

Artificial reservoir on the island of Majorca in the Balearic Islands

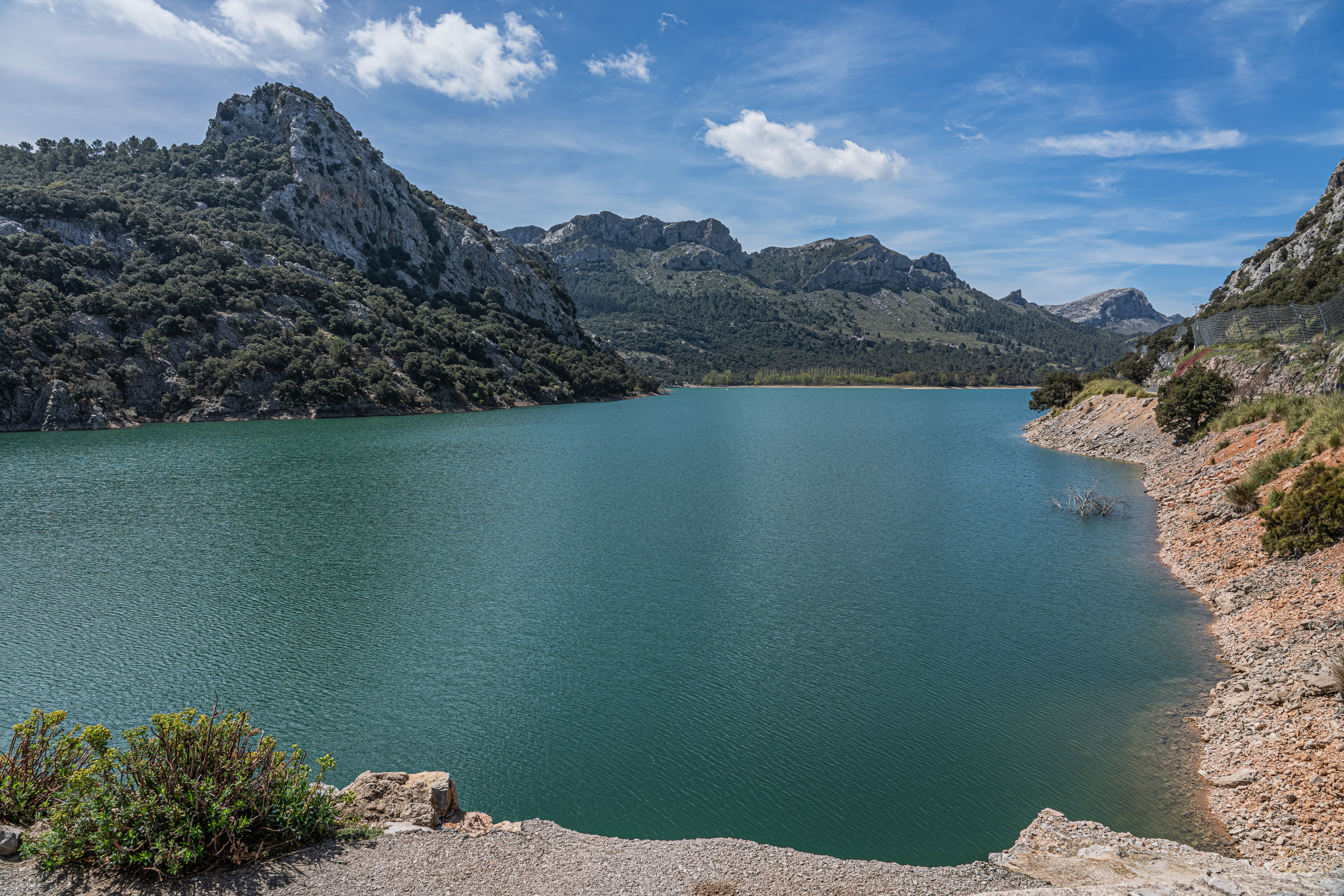

- Location within Balearic Islands Location within Spain
- Interactive map of Gorg Blau
- Location: Majorca, Balearic Islands, Spain
- Coordinates: 39.804°N 2.819°E
- Type: Reservoir

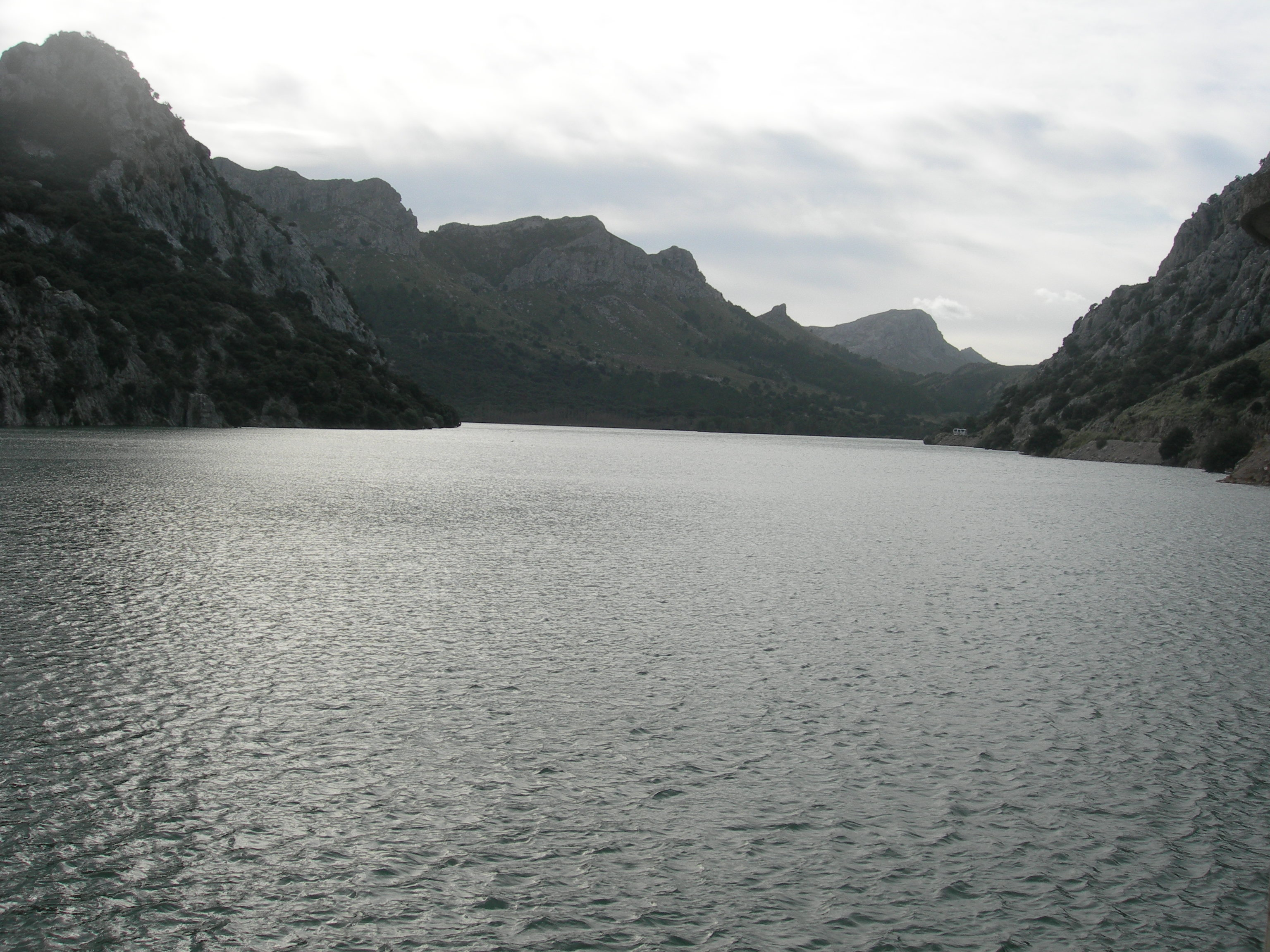
Gorg Blau at 100% capacity

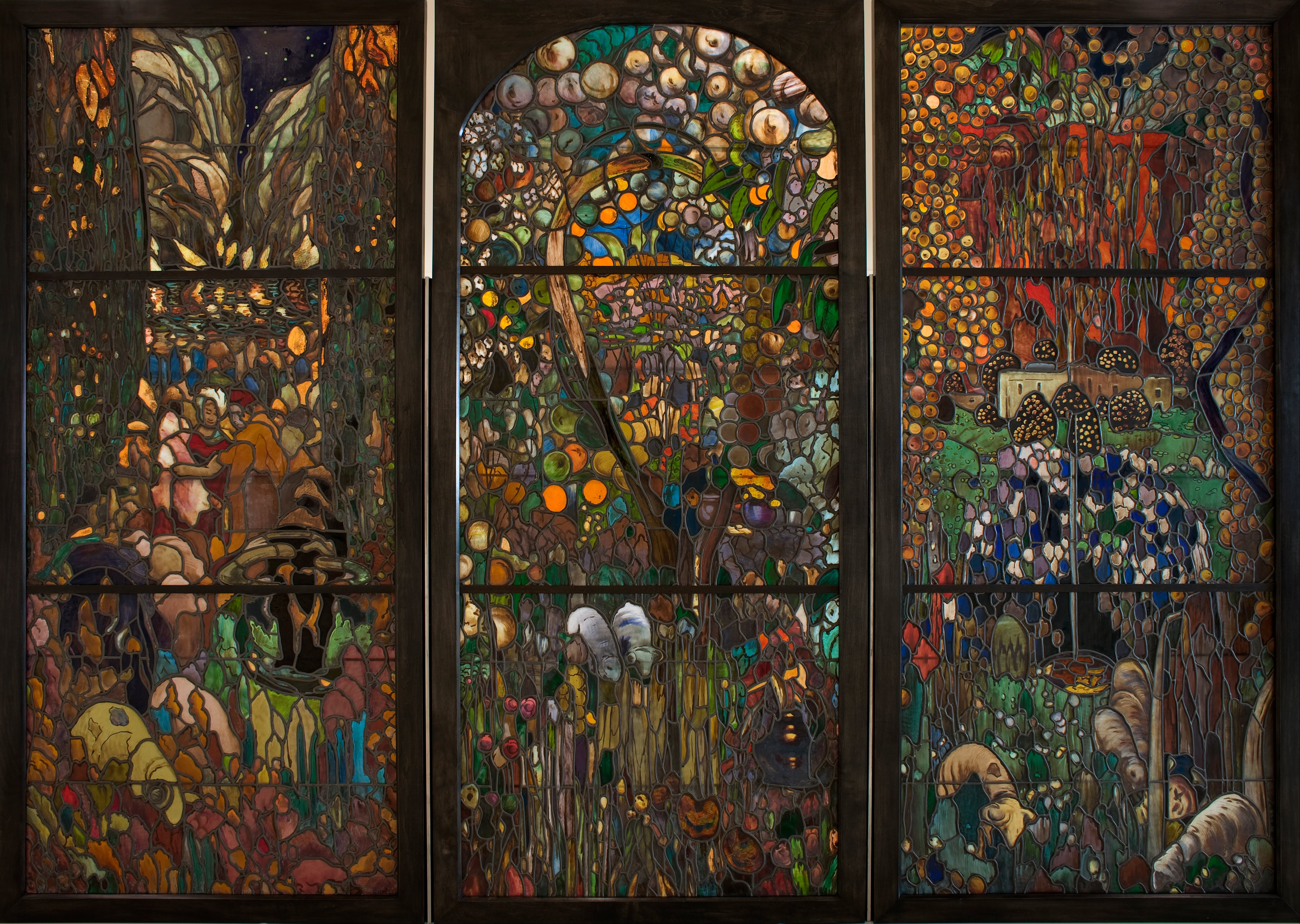
El Gorg Blau by Joaquim Mir, circa 1911.

Gorg Blau is an artificial reservoir on the island of Majorca of the Balearic Islands, located in the valley between Puig Major and Puig de Massanella. Since 1971, it has been used a drinking water source for the city of Palma and the surrounding areas, along with the neighboring Cúber reservoir.

The creek that runs through the Gorg Blau reservoir is known as Torrent del Gorg Blau or Sa Fosca, and is a tributary of the Torrent de Pareis. It was declared a natural monument by the Balearic Islands Government in 2003, and is located within the Serra de Tramuntana World Heritage Site.

== The original Gorg Blau ==
Until 1971, the name Gorg Blau referred to a tributary of the Torrent de Pareis, which was crossed by a bridge on the road to the town of Sóller. In 1906, in the region of Majorca known as Cals Reis, a hydroelectric dam was constructed on Gorg Blau, creating the reservoir. When the reservoir was created, the original bridge was removed and the road was rerouted through a car tunnel.

Prior to the reservoir's creation, the area surrounding the bridge was well known for its beauty. The location where the water, the bridge, and cliff faces met inspired a number of artists, including poets, photographers, and painters.

== References in the arts ==
- One of the first references to the aesthetic beauty of Gorg Blau was made by the Romantic poet Pablo Piferrer, who found "quietude and sadness" in the waters.
- The Mallorcan poet Miquel Costa i Llobera found inspiration here to write the poem El Gorg Blau.
- The painter Joaquim Mir was inspired to create the stained-glass triptych "El Gorg Blau", now on display in the National Art Museum of Catalonia.
