= Santuari de Lluc =

Monastery in Spain

Coordinates: 39.823°N 2.884°E

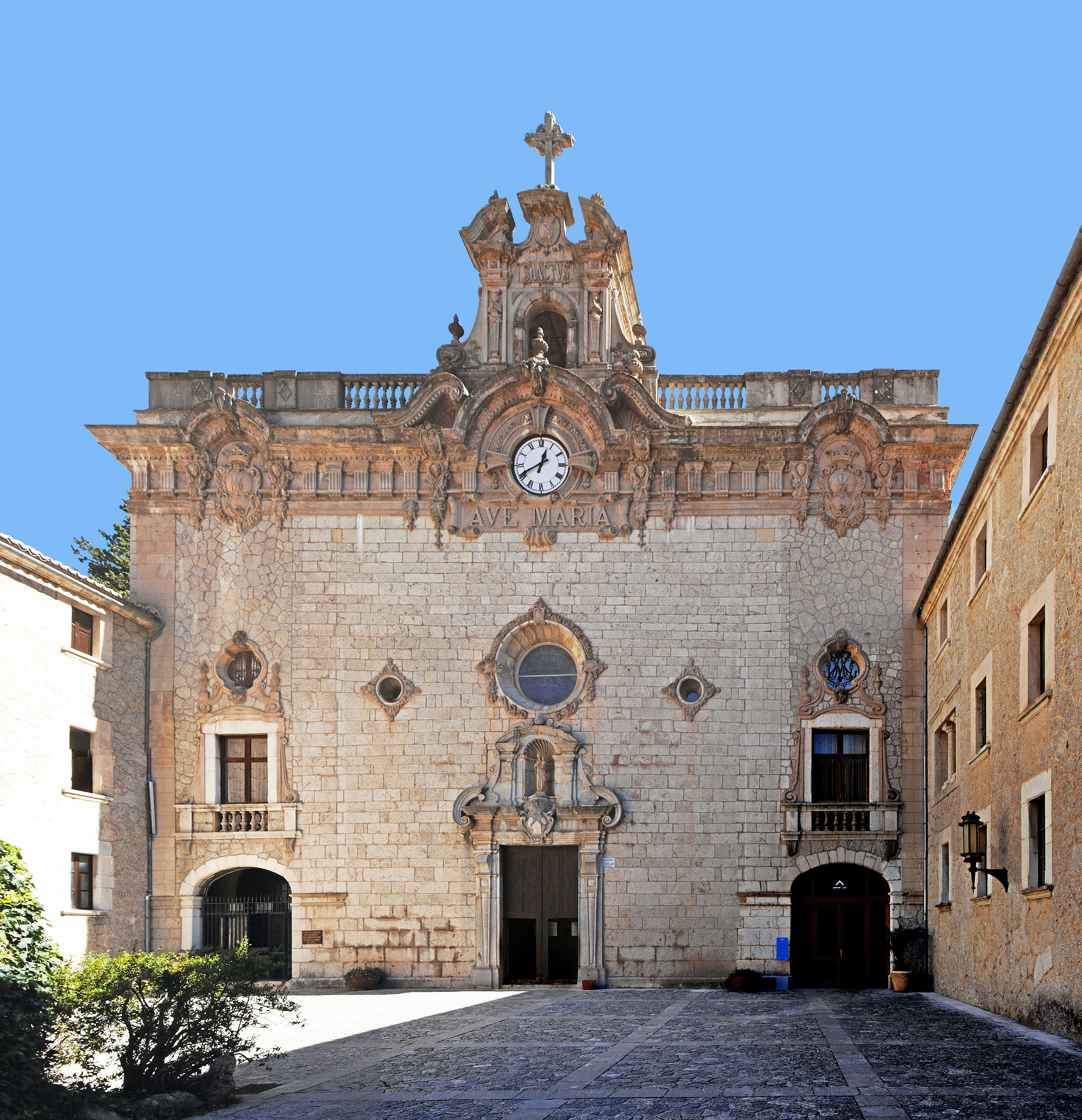
Santuari de Lluc

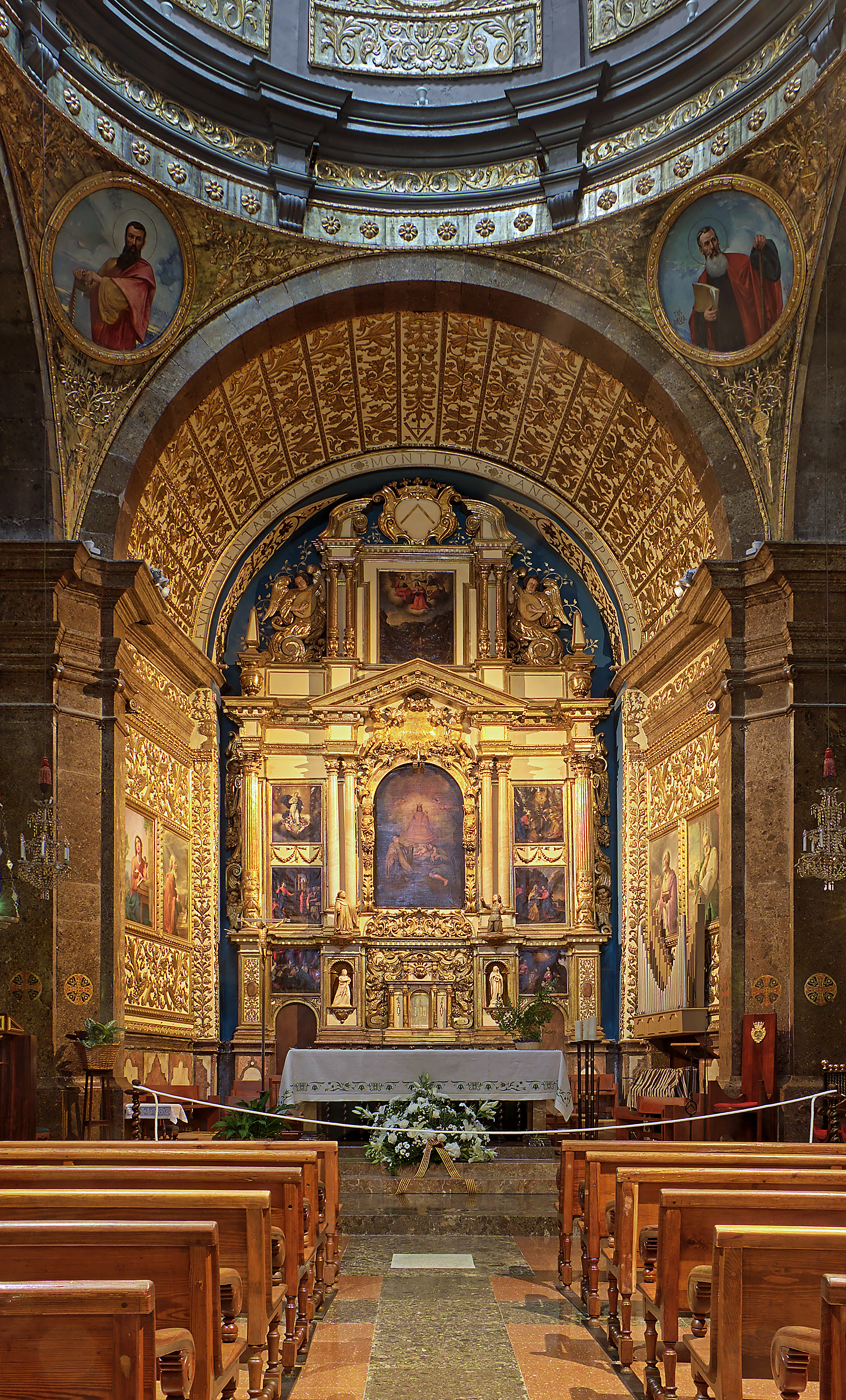
Santuari de Lluc

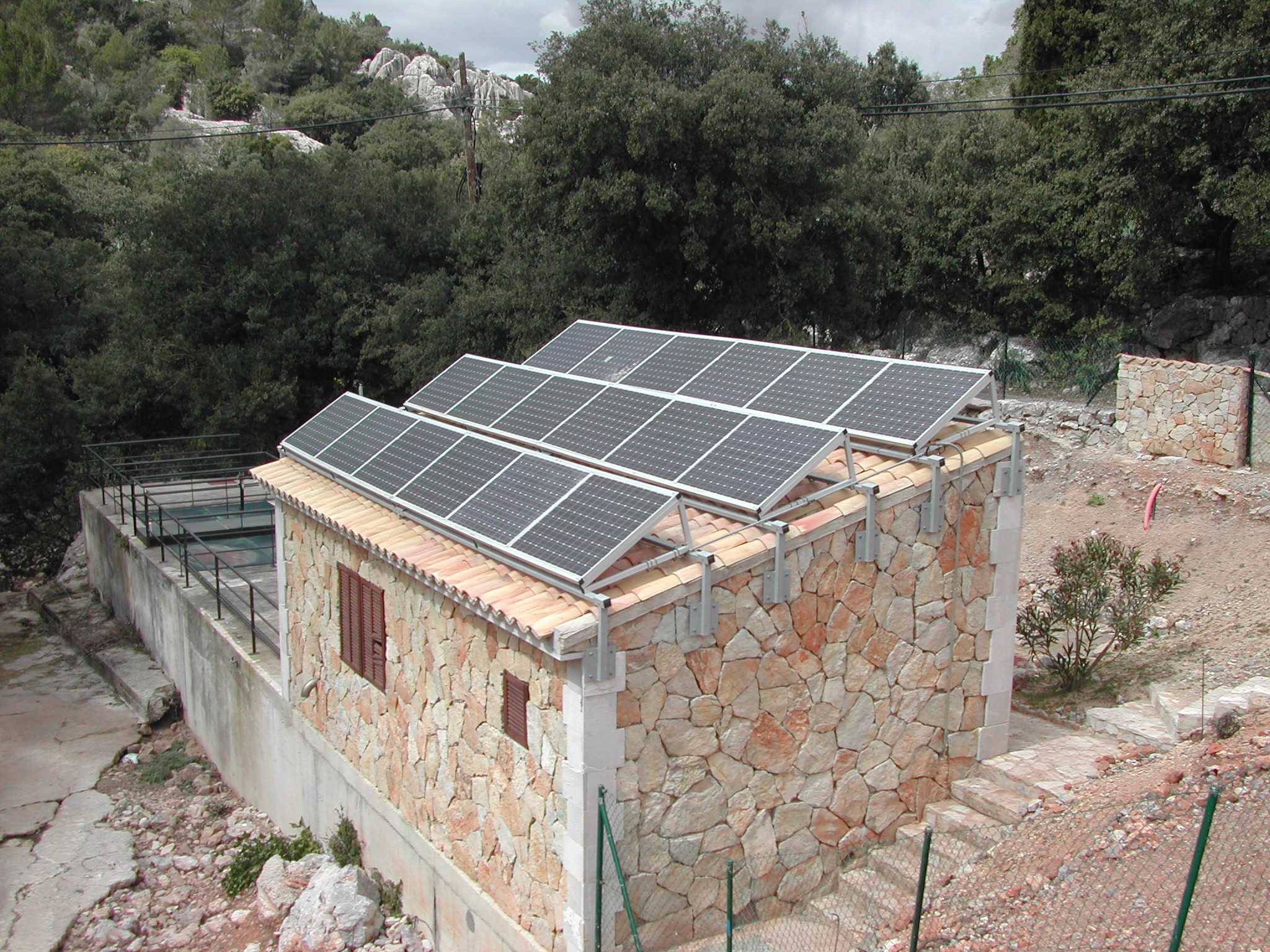
Lluc's environmentally friendly solar-powered sewage treatment plant.

The Santuari de Lluc is a monastery and pilgrimage site located in the municipality of Escorca in north-west Mallorca. It is located in a basin on a height of 525 metres and is surrounded by a number of high mountains such as the Puig de Massanella. The sanctuary was founded in the 13th century after a Moorish shepherd found a statue of the Virgin Mary on the site where the monastery was later erected.

Lluc is considered to be the most important pilgrimage site on Mallorca. It is also known for its boys' choir, Els Blauets (a name derived from the blue cassocks worn by the choristers), which was founded in 1531; the choir holds regular concerts and has gained international fame. A boarding school and numerous tourist-orientated facilities are to be found in the town. Today, the cells of former monks are leased to visitors.

As it is located centrally in the Serra de Tramuntana the monastery is often used as a starting point for walking-tours. Each year, on the first weekend in August, there is a night walk from Palma to the sanctuary. The walk commences at 23:00 hours, leaving from the capital's Plaça Güell.

Behind the monastery buildings is a botanical garden trail, containing a small exposition on preserving the environment of the Mallorcan mountain region.
