= Banyalbufar =

- Municipality and town
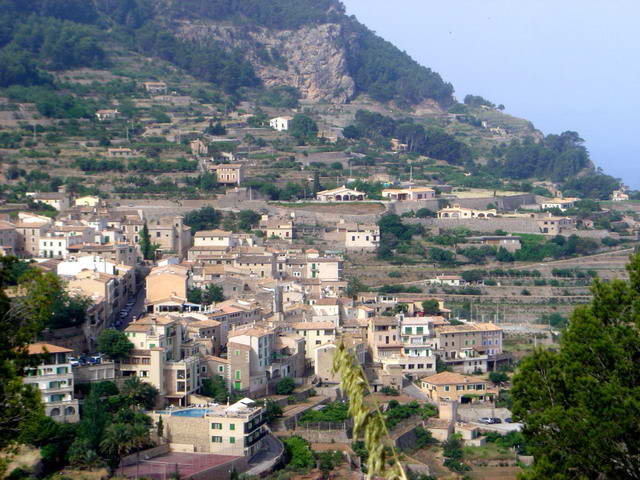

- Coat of arms

- Municipal location

- Location of the town in Mallorca Banyalbufar (Balearic Islands) Banyalbufar (Spain)
- Coordinates: 39°41′16″N 2°31′0″E
- Country: Spain
- Autonomous Community: Balearic Islands
- Province: Balearic Islands
- Island: Mallorca
- Comarca: Serra de Tramuntana

Government
  - Mayor (2007-): Mateu Ferrà Bestard

Area
  - Total: 7.1 sq mi (18.5 km^{2})
- Elevation: 330 ft (100 m)

Population (2025)
  - Total: 573
  - Density: 80.2/sq mi (31.0/km^{2})
- Time zone: UTC+1 (CET)
  - Summer (DST): UTC+2 (CEST)
- Website: www.ajbanyalbufar.net

Banyalbufar (Balearic Catalan: [bəɲəlbuˈfa], also [bəɲəlβuˈfa]) is a municipality on the Spanish Balearic island of Mallorca. The town of the same name is the administrative seat of the municipality. It borders the municipalities of Estellencs, Puigpunyent, Esporles, and Valldemossa.

== Geography ==
The municipality of Banyalbufar has an area of 18.1 km^{2} and lies next to the Serra de Tramuntana mountain off the C-710 along the road from Andratx to Valldemossa. The municipality also contains four smaller mountains, of which Mola de Planícia is the highest at 942 m, and Sa Talaia is the lowest at 309 m. Rainfall can occur all year round. The driest month is July with an average rainfall of 10.1 L/m^{2}. The heaviest rainfall is in October at 80.9 L/m^{2}. The heaviest rainfall in Banyalbufar occurred on 10 June 1975 at 170 L/m^{2}.

== History ==
The original name Banyalbahar comprises two different components, both of Arabic origin: banya (constructed) and bahar. Banya derives from the name of a Moorish settlement established on the island in the 10th century. The original meaning of Banyalbufar is, therefore, "founded by the sea".

Following the Catalan conquest of Majorca in 1229, Banyalbufar came under control of Gilabert de Cruïlles (ca) and Ramon sa Clusa. During the Middle Ages and up until the 15th century, the valley was ruled under a practically absolutist government, the Barony of Banyalbufar. The baron maintained the civil and criminal jurisdiction over the entire population.

The inhabitants of Banyalbufar devoted themselves almost exclusively to agriculture. Fishing remained merely a secondary industry. Produce included wheat, barley, pulses, olives, flax, hemp, saffron and, above all, wine. The local Malvasier grape was highly prized. After a long period of decline, there are now efforts to revive this fruit. In previous times, the location was in reality a large vineyard. Around 2,000 steppes emanate from the peak of the location, which were once devoted exclusively to the production of Malvasier wine. The wine was highly favoured by the King of Aragon, and was in no small part a motive for the conquest by James I.

Today mostly tomatoes and other fruits are produced. Irrigation of the fields is inextricably linked to the production of wine. The solution presented to solve irrigatory problems in this region is impressive and prime example of the Moorish hydro-expertise on the island. The aqueducts, which provide vital cost-free water from the mountains for the agriculture, originate for the greater part from the Arabic period. Dry walls, constructed by the Moors from the stones in the fields, halt the flow of water, and numerous water basins capture any excess water.

== Demographics ==
Banyalbufar has 568 inhabitants (as of 2005) with a population density of 31 persons/km^{2}. In 1991, 85.7% of the inhabitants were Mallorcan, 8.3% came from other Spanish regions and only around 6% was foreigners. The highest population recorded was in 1920 at 894 inhabitants. The population dropped drastically in the next ten years, probably due to political unrest in the locality. In 1930, Banyalbufar had only 200 inhabitants.

In 1991 there were still illiterate people in Banyalbufar. The majority of the population receive either no formal education (111 persons), a basic education (99 persons) or a mid-stage education (86 persons), with only 47 persons undertaking the Bachillerato.

The population spread is as follows. Figures are accurate as of 1 January 2005 and do not include isolated communities (and thus do not comprise the total number of inhabitants of Algaida).

- Banyalbufar - 407 inhabitants
- Es Port des Canonge - 62 inhabitants
- Son Coll - 28 inhabitants

== Points of interest ==
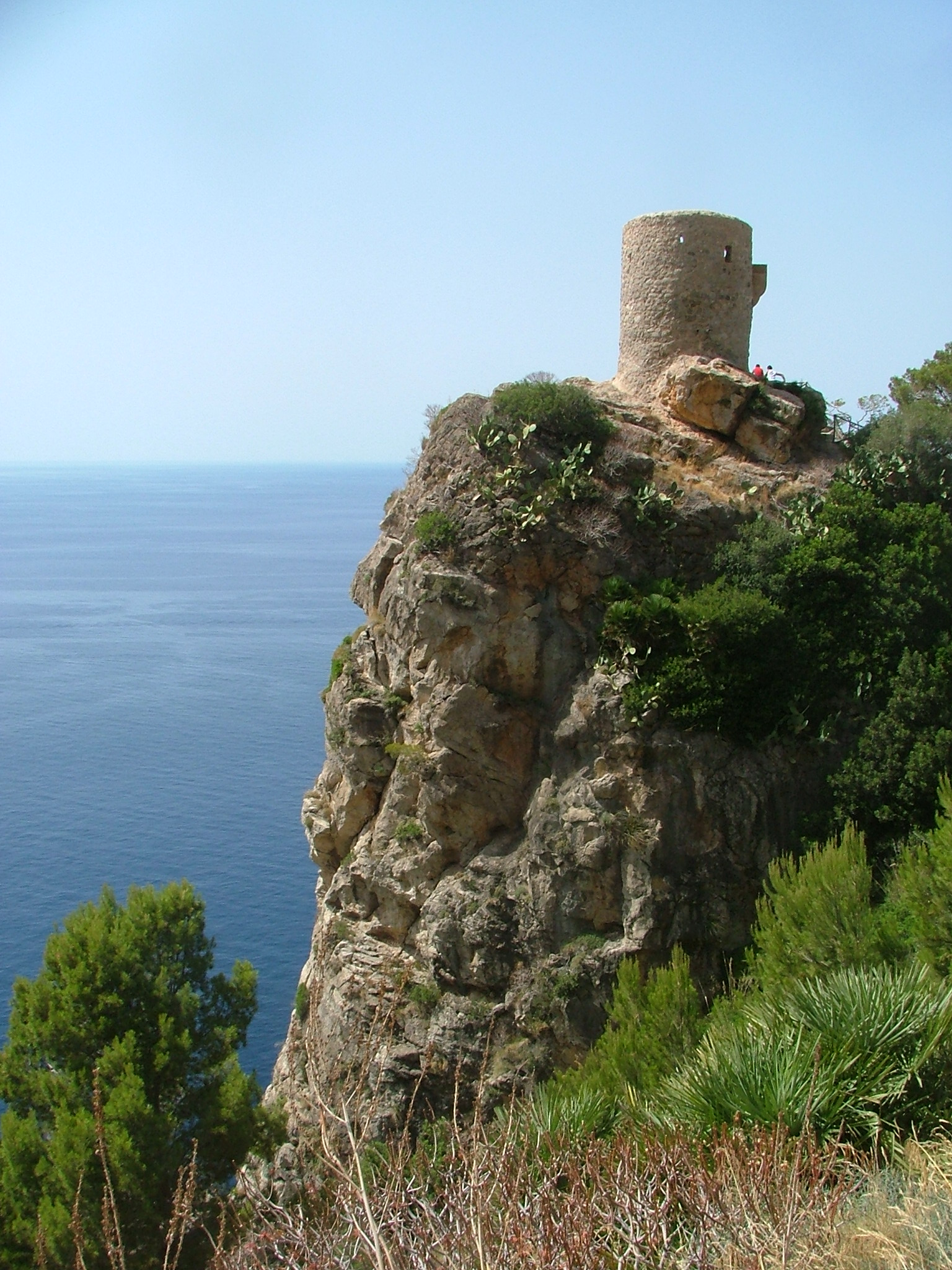
Torre del Verger or de Ses Animes

In order to protect themselves from Moorish pirates, the inhabitants constructed a watchtower outside of the municipality. The watchtower, known as the Torre de ses Animes, overlooks the sea and is today the most-visited point of interest in Mallorca. The small bay-beach is accessible only by a steep stairway. Near the centre of the village lies an old manor-house known as La Baronía which now operates as a hotel.

== See also ==
- List of municipalities in Balearic Islands
