= Cuber (disambiguation) =

Cuber is a small settlement in Slovenia.

Cuber may also refer to:

- Someone who solves the Rubik's Cube puzzle
- Ronnie Cuber (1941–2022), jazz saxophonist
- Cúber, a reservoir on Mallorca, Spain
- Cuber, a character first appeared in the episode "Five Short Graybles" of the animated series Adventure Time
