= Estellencs =

- Municipality
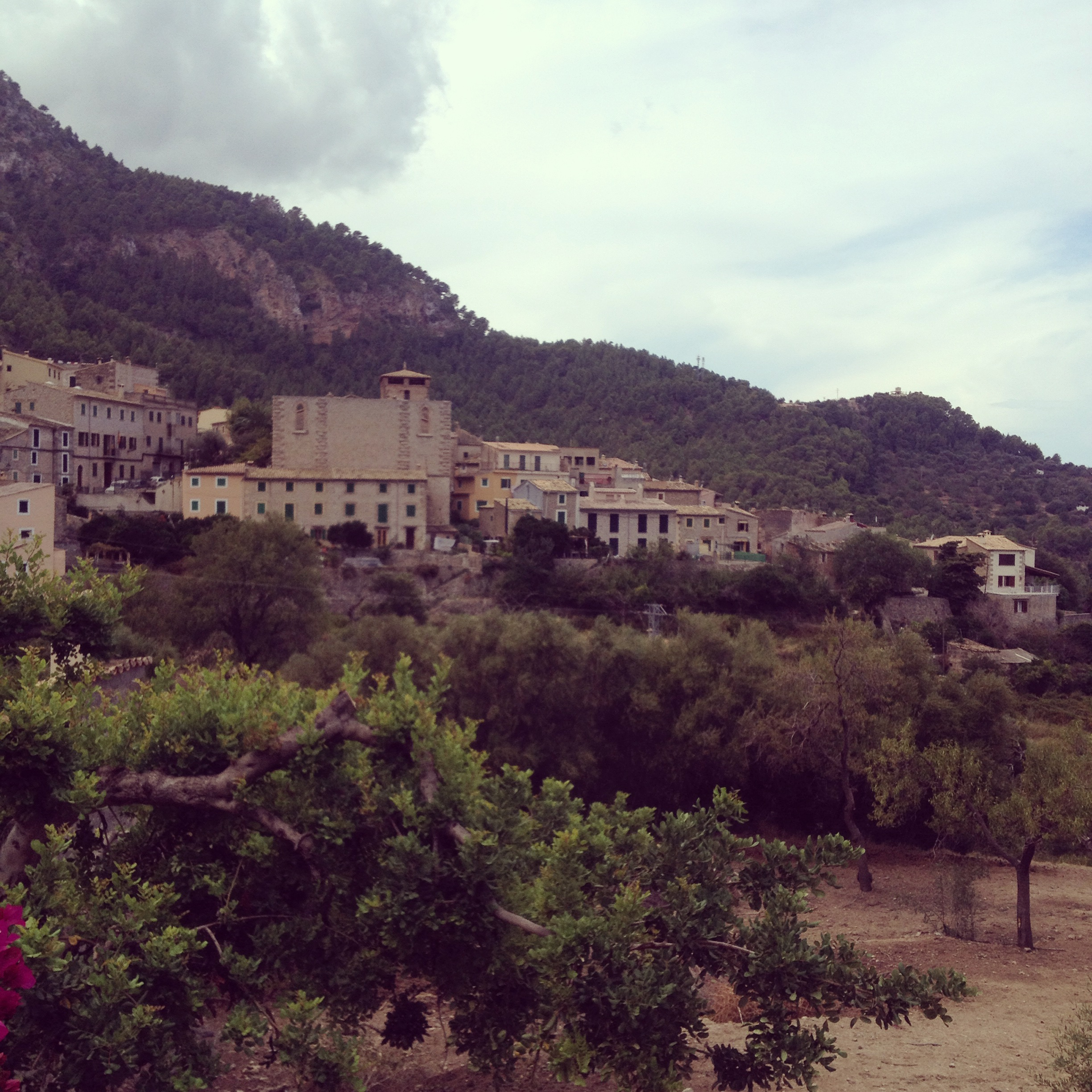
- Estellencs

- Coat of arms

- Mpa of Estelllencs in Mallorca

- Estellencs shown within Mallorca Estellencs (Balearic Islands) Estellencs (Spain)
- Coordinates: 39°39′12″N 2°28′53″E
- Country: Spain
- Autonomous community: Balearic Islands
- Province: Balearic Islands
- Island: Mallorca
- Comarca: Serra de Tramuntana
- Administrative HQ: Estellencs

Government
  - Type: Municipal corporation
  - Body: Ajuntament d'Estellencs
  - Mayor: Bartomeu Jover Sánchez (PP)

Area
  - Total: 13 km^{2} (5.0 sq mi)

Population (2025-01-01)
  - Total: 369
- Time zone: UTC+1 (Central European Time)
  - Summer (DST): UTC+2 (Central European Summer Time)
- Website: www.ajestellencs.net

Estellencs (Balearic Catalan: [əstəˈʎəŋks]) is a municipality in Mallorca in the Balearic Islands, Spain. The village of the same name is the administrative seat of the municipality. It borders the municipalities of Andratx, Calvià, Puigpunyent, and Banyalbufar.

It lies between the Serra de Tramuntana mountain range, on the slopes of Puig de Galatzó (1,026 metres), and the Mediterranean Sea.
