= Puig Tomir =

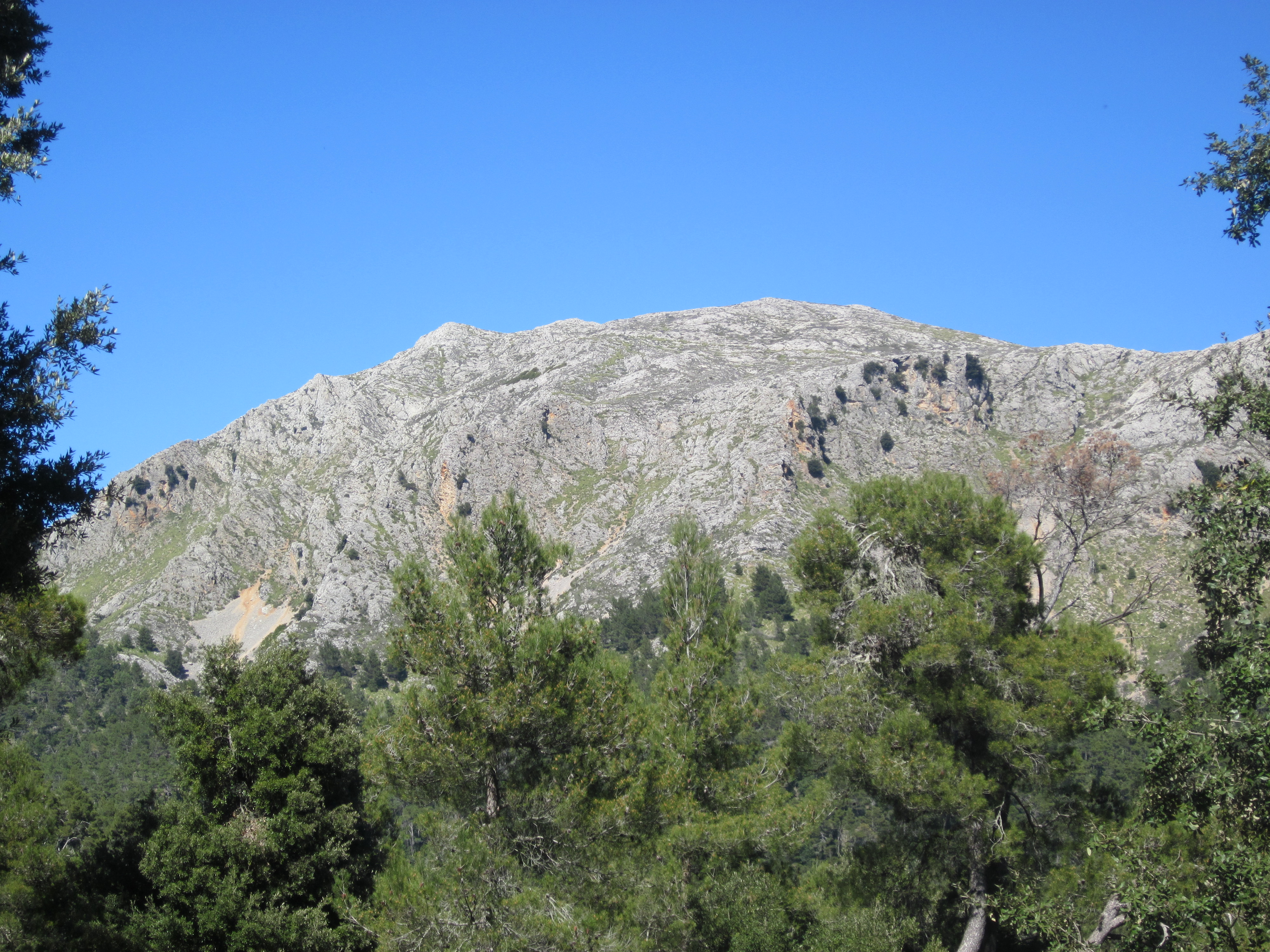
- Puig Tomir, view from the road between Coll Pelat and Coll des Pedregaret.

Highest point
- Elevation: 1,103 m (3,619 ft)
- Coordinates: 39°50′42″N 2°55′39″E

Geography
- Location within Mallorca Location within Spain
- Location: Serra de Tramuntana, Mallorca, Spain
- Parent range: Serra de Tramuntana

Puig Tomir is a 1,103-metre (3,619 ft) mountain near Lluc, situated in the Serra de Tramuntana on the Spanish island of Mallorca.
