= Cúber =

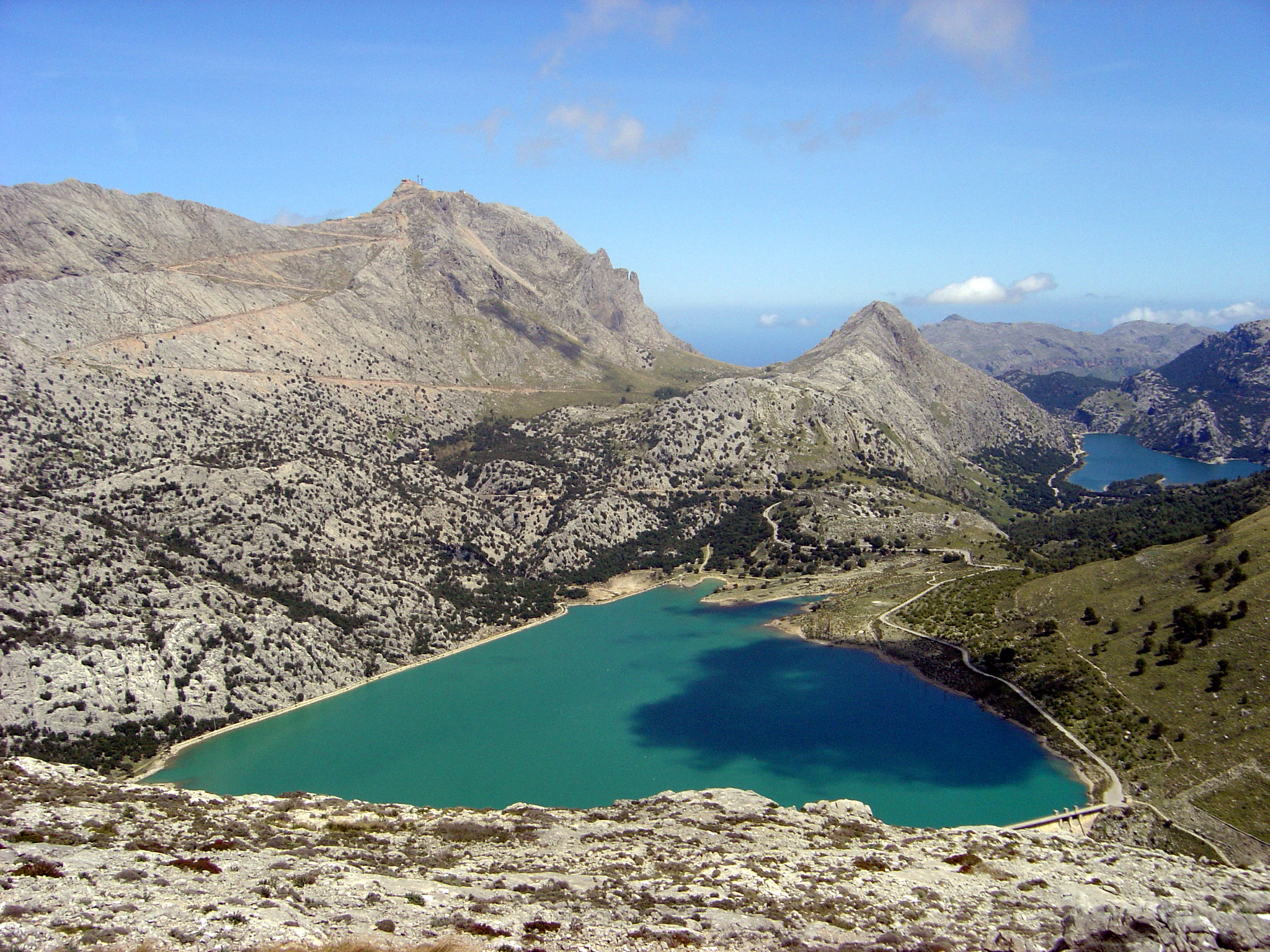
- Cúber reservoir with the Puig Major behind

- Location within Balearic Islands Location within Spain
- Interactive map of Cúber
- Location: Mallorca, Balearic Islands, Spain
- Coordinates: 39.7840°N 2.7889°E
- Type: Reservoir

Cúber is an artificial water reservoir located at the valleys of Puig Major and Morro de Cúber, on the island of Mallorca, Spain. With the Gorg Blau, they provide water to the city of Palma de Mallorca and the surrounding areas by the Almandrà torrent.

Cúber receives its name by the "possessió" near the reservoir: el Morro de Cúber. There is a refuge with a maximum capacity of 6 people with light proportioned by solar panels, a chimney and a table, but there are not any beds in the refuge.
