= Escorca =

- Municipality
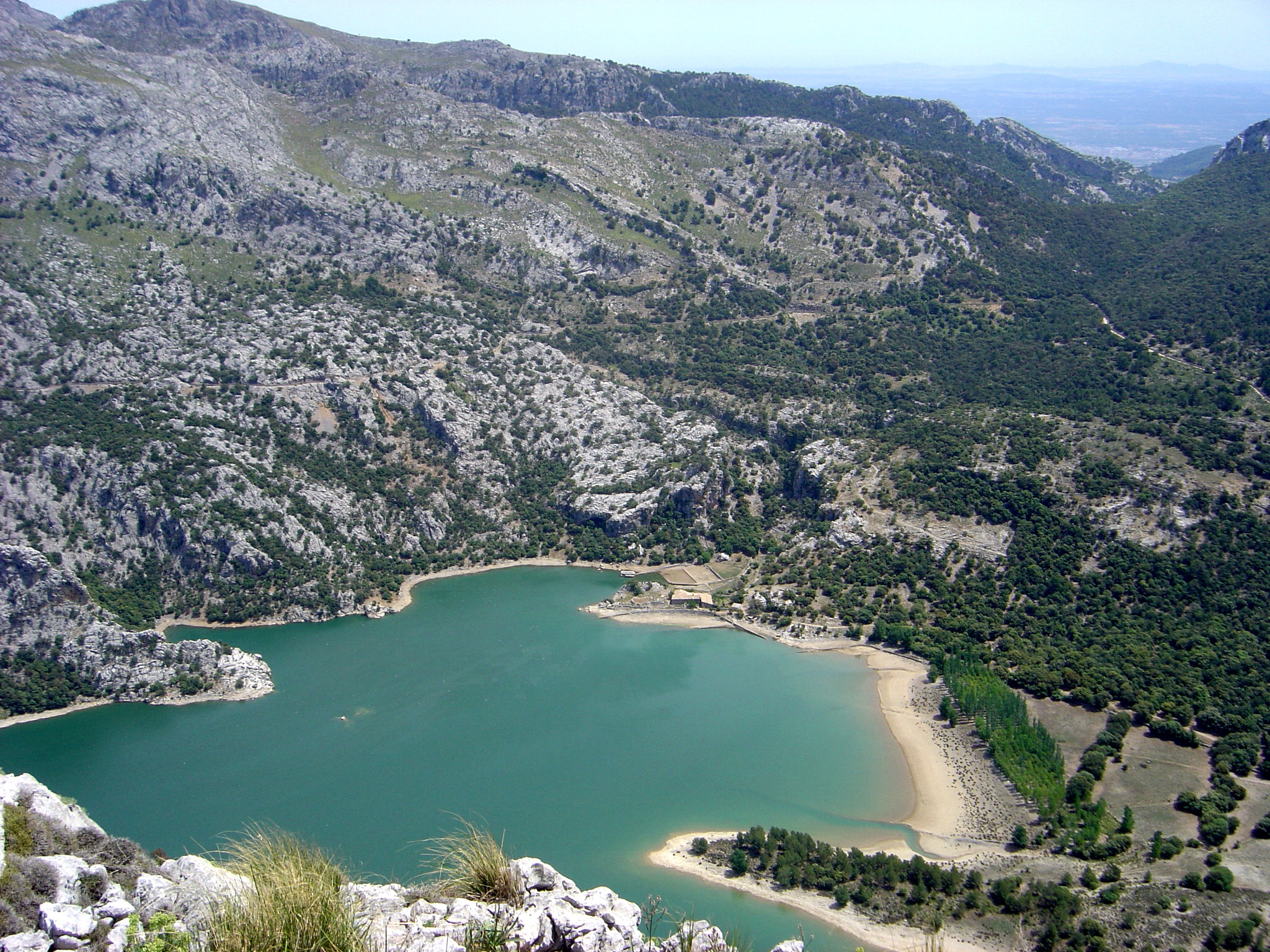
- Blue Gorge

- Coat of arms

- Location within Mallorca

- Location in Mallorca Escorca (Balearic Islands) Escorca (Spain)
- Coordinates: 39°49′N 2°51′E
- Country: Spain
- Autonomous community: Balearic Islands
- Province: Balearic Islands
- Comarca: Serra de Tramuntana

Government
  - Mayor: Antoni Solivellas Estrany (PP)

Area
  - Total: 139.39 km^{2} (53.82 sq mi)

Population (2024)
  - Total: 194
  - Density: 1.39/km^{2} (3.60/sq mi)
- Time zone: UTC+1 (CET)
  - Summer (DST): UTC+2 (CEST)

Escorca (Balearic Catalan: [əsˈkoɾkə]) is a municipality in northwest Mallorca, one of the Balearic Islands, Spain.

== Hills ==
- Puig Major (1445 m)
- Puig de Massanella (1364 m)
- Puig Tomir (1102 m)
- Puig Roig (1003 m)

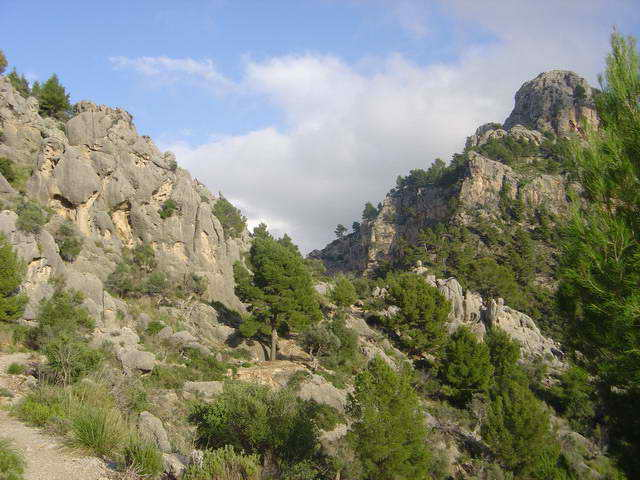
Coll de Biniamar
