= Puig de Massanella =

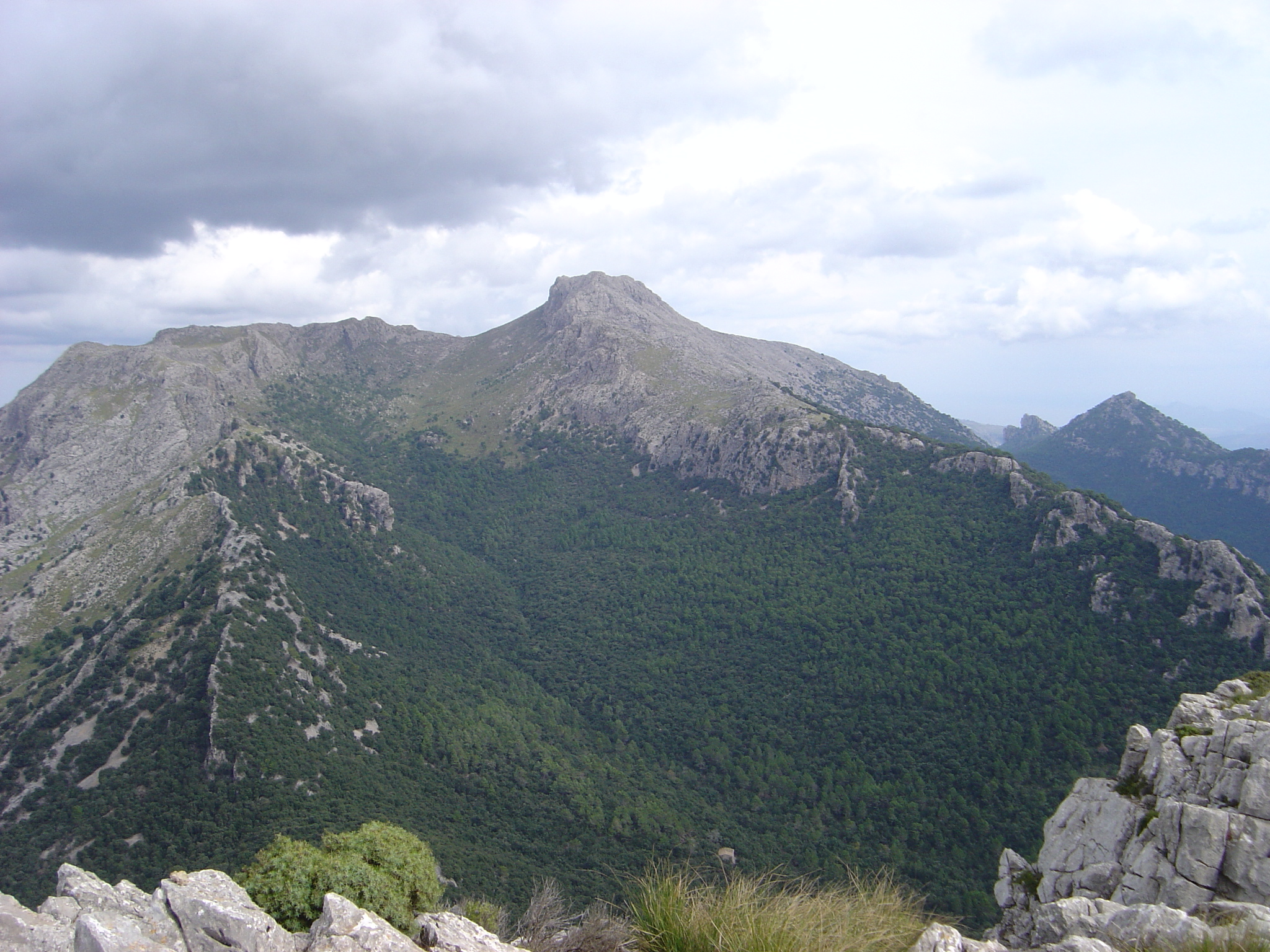

Highest point
- Elevation: 1,364 m (4,475 ft)
- Coordinates: 39°48′N 2°51′E

Geography
- Location: Mallorca, Spain
- Parent range: Serra de Tramuntana

Puig de Massanella is the second highest peak on the Spanish island of Mallorca. It is situated in the Serra de Tramuntana mountains. It is the highest peak on the island whose summit is accessible, as its higher neighbour Puig Major has a military-run antenna complex on the summit. It is a very popular mountain to climb. There is a walking route to the summit from the south, various scrambling routes from a high col to the north, marked with small cairns and red dots painted on rocks, and an easy scrambling route which starts slightly lower down on the south west side of the col. The summit is unusual in having a deep pit which appears to have been formed by limestone dissolution (see Karst) which was said to have been used for storing snow in the past. There are several ruins on a col near the summit which used to be snow houses (see Ice house (building)).

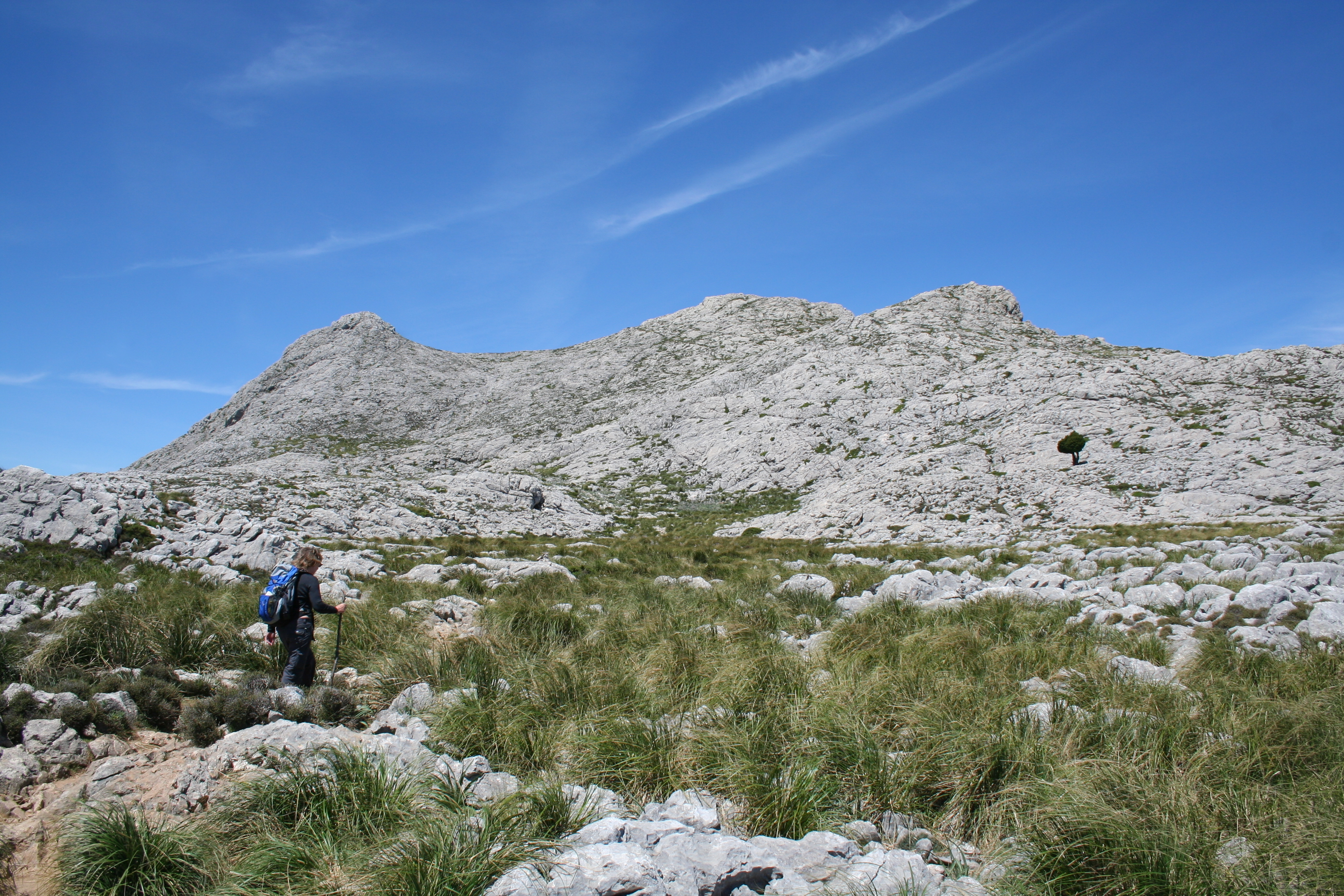
Peak from southeast

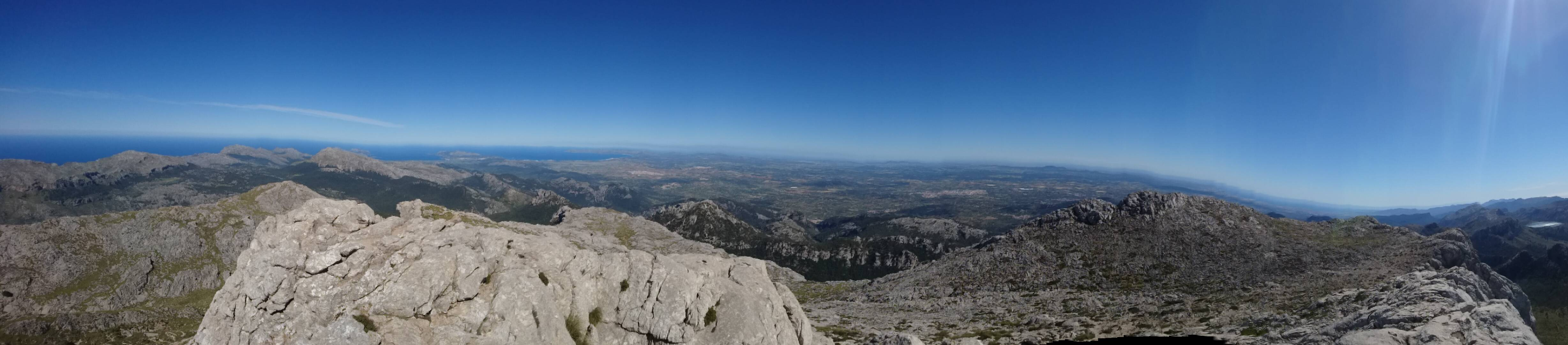
View from the summit
