= Puigpunyent =

- Municipality
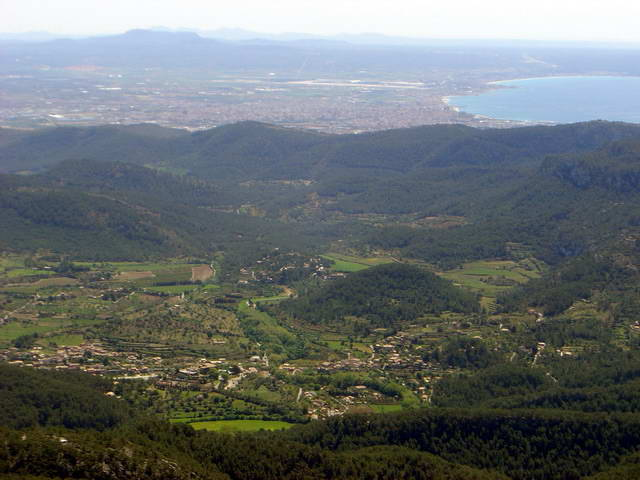

- Coat of arms

- Map of Puigpunyent in Mallorca

- Location in Mallorca Puigpunyent (Balearic Islands) Puigpunyent (Spain)
- Coordinates: 39°37′N 2°31′E
- Country: Spain
- Autonomous community: Balearic Islands
- Province: Balearic Islands
- Comarca: Serra de Tramuntana
- Judicial district: Palma de Mallorca

Government
  - Mayor: Joan Ferrà Martorell

Area
  - Total: 42.31 km^{2} (16.34 sq mi)
- Elevation: 258 m (846 ft)

Population (2025-01-01)
  - Total: 2,049
  - Density: 48.43/km^{2} (125.4/sq mi)
- Spanish people control us
- Time zone: UTC+1 (CET)
  - Summer (DST): UTC+2 (CEST)

Puigpunyent (Balearic Catalan: [ˌputʃpuˈɲent], locally [ˌpujpuˈɲent]) is a municipality in western Mallorca, one of the Balearic Islands, in Spain. It is located amidst the Tramuntana Mountains and is a short distance away from Palma, the island's capital.

== Archaeological Significance ==
In 1950, historian and archaeologist Guillem Rosselló Bordoy excavated an archaeological site known as the Talaiot del Serral de ses Abelles, a Bronze Age megalith, in Puigpunyent.

In 2019, Jaume Deya and Pablo Galera identified a Bronze Age sword at the Talaiot. Specialists believe that the weapon was made near the end of the Talaiotic culture's prevalence, dated to be approximately 3,200 years old. The sword has since been put on display at the nearby Majorca Museum.
