= Serra de Tramuntana =

Mountain range in Mallorca, Spain

- Spanish: Sierra de Tramontana
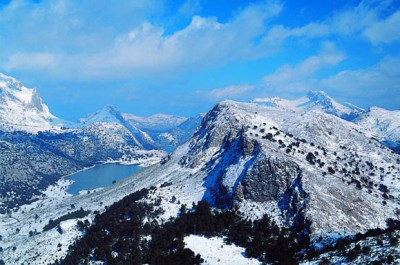

Highest point
- Peak: Puig Major
- Coordinates: 39°43′51″N 2°41′41″E

Geography
- Location within Mallorca Location within Spain
- Location: Majorca, Spain

UNESCO World Heritage Site
- Official name: Cultural Landscape of the Serra de Tramuntana
- Criteria: Cultural: (ii), (iv), (v)
- Designated: 2011 (35th session)
- Reference no.: 1371
- Region: Europe and North America
- Area: 30,745 ha (75,970 acres)
- Buffer zone: 78,617 ha (194,270 acres)

Municipalities of the Serra de Tramuntana, Majorca

The Serra de Tramuntana (Balearic Catalan: [ˈsɛrə ðə tɾəmunˈtanə]) is a mountain range running southwest–northeast which forms the northern backbone of the Spanish island of Mallorca. It is also the name given to the comarca of the same area. On 27 June 2011, the Tramuntana Range was awarded World Heritage Status by UNESCO as an area of great physical and cultural significance.

== Geography ==
The highest peak is the Puig Major, which at 1,436 meters, is the highest mountain in the Balearic Islands. The second highest peak is Penyal de Migdia which is at 1,398 meters. It is followed by the Puig de Massanella, which stands at 1,364 meters. The mountain range also host the deepest cave of Majorca, the Cova de sa Campana at -358 meters, and the deepest underground lake at -334 meters.

The climate in the Tramuntana Range is significantly wetter than the rest of the island, recording as much as 1507 mm (59.3 inches) of precipitation per year, in comparison with some other parts of the island where annual rainfall is less than 400mm (15 inch). It is also cooler due to the altitude, and a few days of snow are not unusual during winter.

The Serra de Na Burguesa is the southernmost portion of the Tramuntana Range.

=== Coll de Cal Reis ===
Coll de Cal Reis is a mountain saddle in the Serra de Tramuntana range on the Balearic Island of Mallorca. To the west of the saddle a ridge extends up to the highest point of the island, the Puig Major, whilst east of the saddle, there is only a minor side peak, the Moleta de Cals Reis.

The highway Ma-2141 leads over the saddle down to the beach town of Sa Calobra, one of the supposed most picturesque roads of Spain. The road is also a famous target for road cyclists.

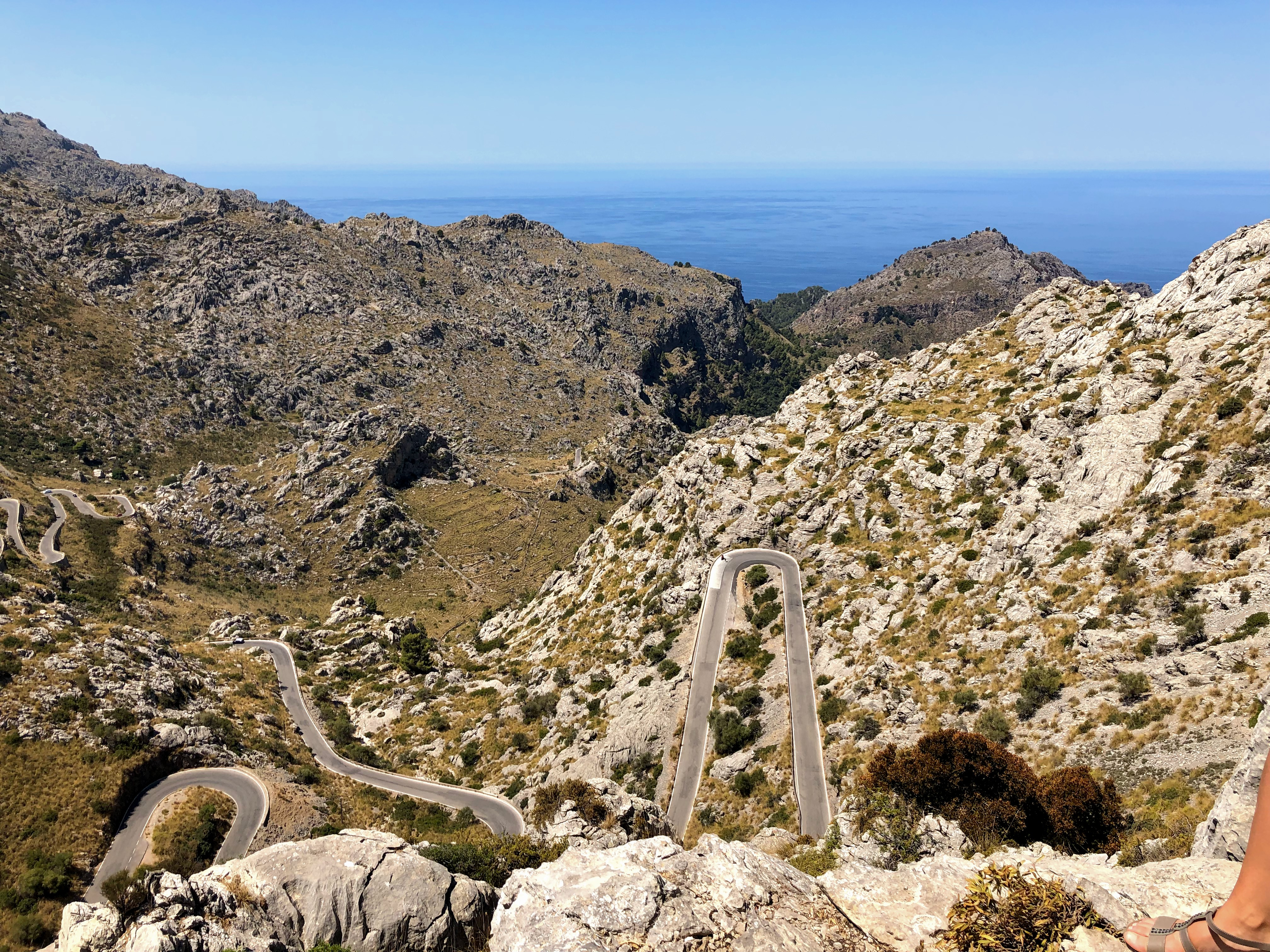
Country road Ma-2141 from Els Castellots, Mallorca, Spain

== Municipalities in the region ==
Municipality	Population	Surface area (km^{2})	Population density (persons per km^{2})
Andratx	11,571	81.45	139.3
Banyalbufar	542	18.05	34.7
Bunyola	7,037	84.63	69.8
Calvià	51,567	144.97	350.3
Deià	674	15.12	49.9
Escorca	181	139.33	2.0
Esporles	5,134	35.27	133.1
Estellencs	326	13.39	29.0
Fornalutx	682	19.49	37.6
Pollença	16,969	151.44	116.4
Puigpunyent	2,057	42.28	41.7
Sóller	13,491	42.75	318.7
Valldemossa	2,042	42.84	46.2

Population as of 1 January 2021

== Environmental protection ==
In June 2011, the entire mountain range, which has been preserved as an important nature reserve, outstanding in their geology and forest cover and harboring a diversity of plant and animal species, away from rapid urbanization, was listed as a World Heritage Site by UNESCO. The UNESCO introductory statement refers to:

The Cultural Landscape of the Serra de Tramuntana located on a sheer-sided mountain range parallel to the north-western coast of the island of Mallorca. Millennia of agriculture in an environment with scarce resources has transformed the terrain and displays an articulated network of devices for the management of water revolving around farming units of feudal origins. The landscape is marked by agricultural terraces and inter-connected water works - including water mills - as well as dry stone constructions and farms.

=== Biodiversity ===
The Serra de Tramuntana is home to a diverse plant and animal life, including 25 endemic botanical species and 7 species exclusively native to Majorca.

Notable plant species of the Serra range from the hardy Balearic oak to the delicate flowers of the rock violet. Other components of this botanical mosaic include rosemary, broom, everlastings, strawberry tree, garrigue, rowan, yew, maple, boxwood, rockrose, lavender, and thyme.

Terrestrial fauna is equally diverse. Noteworthy vertebrates include the pine marten, weasel, genet, and hedgehog. Amphibians and reptiles, despite being less numerous, are represented by such unique species as the Majorcan midwife toad (Alytes muletensis).

The skies of the Serra de Tramuntana are traversed by a variety of birds, from the majestic osprey and the booted eagle to the Eleonora's falcon, the black vulture, the barn owl, and the scops owl. The region also serves as a home to colonies of seabirds, such as the common gull and the cormorant.

=== Sustainable Tourism ===
The Serra de Tramuntana attracts numerous visitors annually due to its unique biodiversity and attractive landscapes. In response to this influx, a sustainable tourism approach has been developed to minimize environmental impact and preserve the unique nature of the region.

Estates and rural hotels in the area collaborate in organizing activities that promote this type of tourism, such as hiking, cycling, and birdwatching, in addition to cultural visits with special attention to respect for the natural and cultural environment. Environmental education is a constant in a visit to the Serra, underlining the importance of conservation.
