= Puig Major =

Peak in Mallorca, Spain

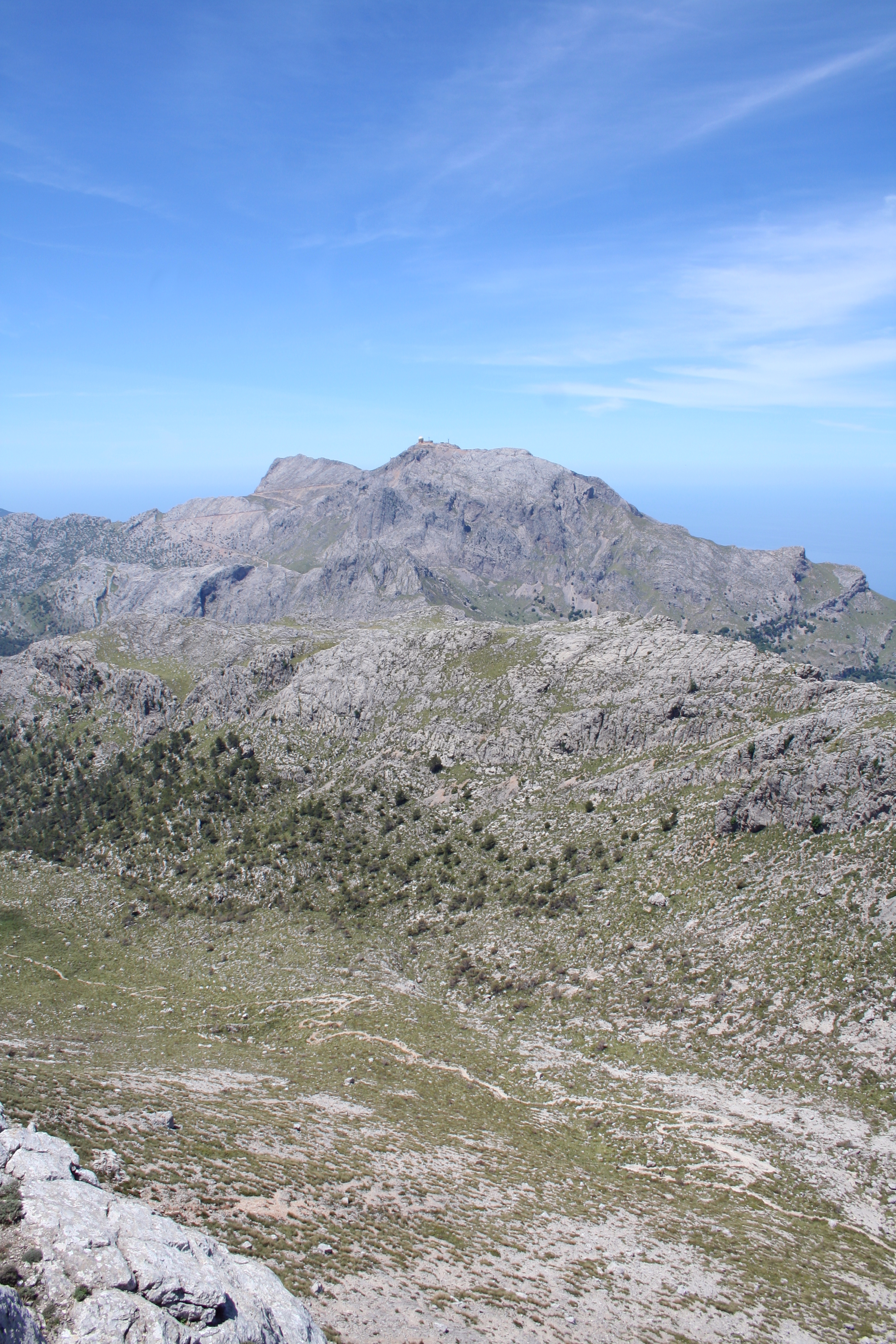
- Rocky mountain landscape

Highest point
- Elevation: 1,445 m (4,741 ft)
- Prominence: 1,445 m (4,741 ft)
- Listing: Ribu
- Coordinates: 39°48′N 2°48′E

Naming
- English translation: Higher Rise
- Language of name: Catalan

Geography
- Location within Spain
- Location: Mallorca, Spain
- Region: Îles Baléares
- Parent range: Serra de Tramuntana

Puig Major (/ˌpʊtʃ.məˈʒɔːr/ puutch-mə-ZHOR; Catalan: [ˌput͡ʃ.məˈʒo]) is the highest peak on the Spanish island of Mallorca. With an elevation of 1,445 m (4,741 ft) above sea level. It is situated in the Serra de Tramuntana mountains. The mountain was used by the United States for an airbase from 1950 to 1993. It lies within the municipality of Escorca.

== Environment ==
Agrostis barceloi is present in the area. The mountain is made of Liassic rock from the Early Jurassic. It is the tallest mountain on the island at a height of 1,445 meters (4,741 ft).

== Military Zone ==
From 1957 to 1959, the United States constructed an airbase across 6.2 hectares of land on Puig Major. This was in use by the USAF 880th Aircraft Control & Warning Radar Squadron Patrol until 1993. Signals from Apollo 11 confirming their safe landing on the Moon were transmitted to the Christopher C. Kraft Jr. Mission Control Center via the military satellite station at Puig Major.

During the second half of the 20th century, two orange protective spheres containing all the radar equipment remained on the summit. They became popular among Mallorcans with the name "Las Bolas" or "Ses Bolles." In 2005 a single, larger sphere was built due to a technological renovation.

== Hiking ==
Hiking has an extensive tradition in Majorca, and hikers love the Puig Major for its beautiful routes, such as the climb to Penyal des Migdia to the southwest of the summit or Morro D'en Pelut to the north. Both routes partially involve the intrusion into the military zone, commonly without permission.

== Works cited ==
=== Books ===
- Buswell, Richard (2013). Mallorca: The Making of the Landscape. Liverpool University Press. doi:10.2307/jj.12638992. ISBN 9781780466811.

=== Journals ===
- Massó, Sergi; López-Pujol, Jordi; López-Alvarado, Javier; Blanché, Cèsar; Sáez, Llorenç (2016). "One species, one genotype: no genotypic variability in the extremely narrow endemic tetraploid Agrostis barceloi (Gramineae)". Plant Systematics and Evolution. 302 (5). Springer Nature: 609–615. JSTOR 44853144.

=== News ===
- "Puig Major summit is a no go area". Majorca Daily Bulletin. 21 January 2021. Archived from the original on 6 July 2025.
- Carter, Humphrey (20 July 2019). "First signals from Apollo II landing on the moon beamed to Majorca". Majorca Daily Bulletin. Archived from the original on 6 July 2025.
- Roberts, Shirley (29 June 2020). "A little drift down memory lane for Humans of Majorca". Majorca Daily Bulletin. Archived from the original on 6 July 2025.
