= Son Costa / Son Fortesa station =

Railway station in Palma, Spain

Son Costa / Son Fortesa
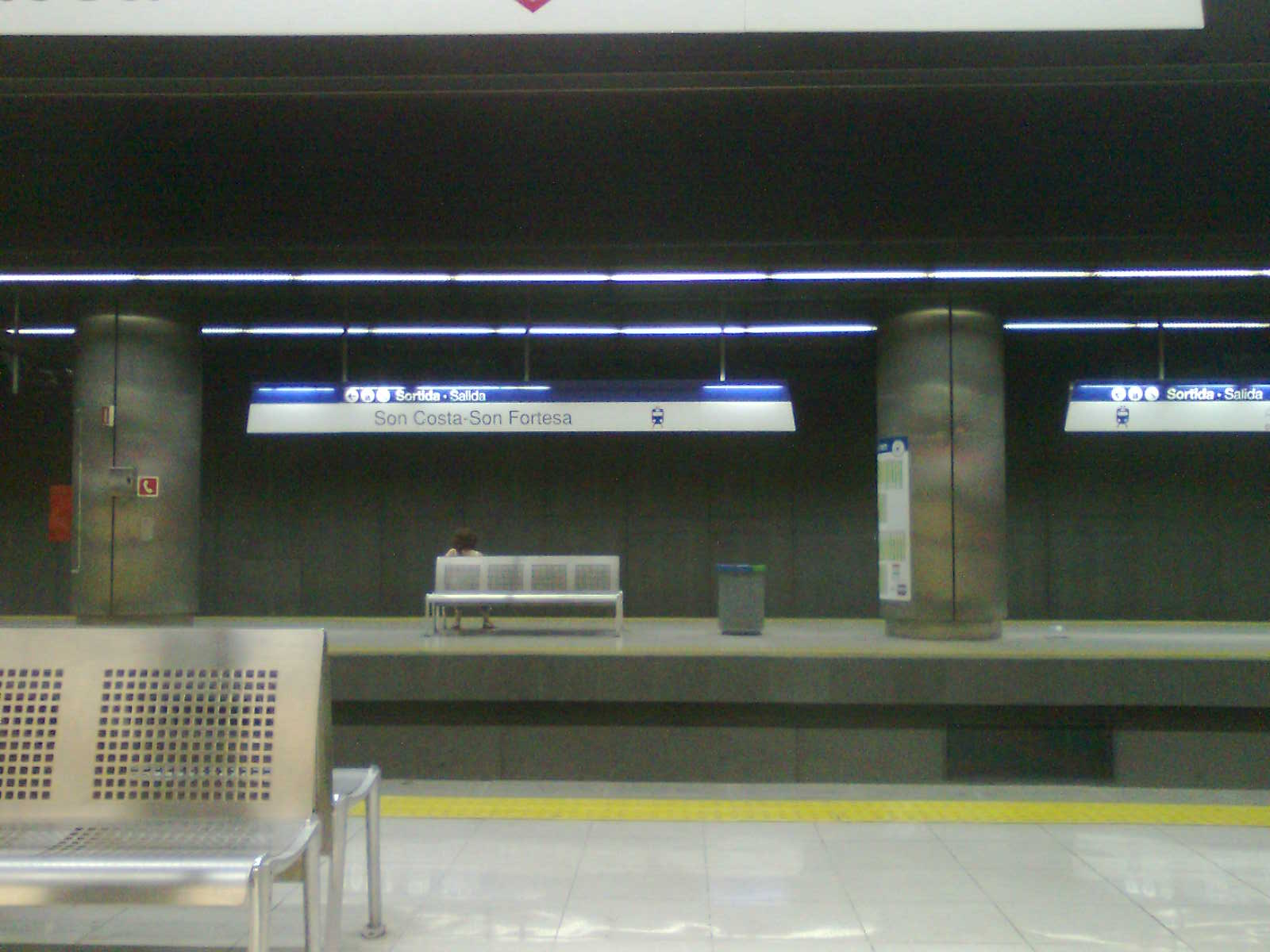

General information
- Location: Palma, Majorca; Balearic Islands, Spain
- Coordinates: 39°35′43″N 2°40′17″E
- Operator: Consorci de Transports de Mallorca (CTM)
- Platforms: 2 island platforms
- Tracks: 2 + 2

Construction
- Structure type: Underground
- Accessible: yes

History
- Opened: 2007

Services
Preceding station	Serveis Ferroviaris de Mallorca	Following station
Jacint Verdaguer towards Palma Intermodal	T1 Weekends	Son Fuster towards Inca
Jacint Verdaguer towards Palma Intermodal	T2 Weekends	Son Fuster towards Sa Pobla
Jacint Verdaguer towards Palma Intermodal	T3 Weekends	Son Fuster towards Manacor
Preceding station	Palma Metro	Following station
Jacint Verdaguer towards Palma Intermodal	M1	Son Fuster Vell towards Parc Bit
Jacint Verdaguer towards Palma Intermodal	M2	Son Fuster towards Marratxí
Location

Son Costa / Son Fortesa is an underground station of Serveis Ferroviaris de Mallorca (SFM) and Palma Metro in Palma on the island of Majorca, Spain. The station is located at the northeasterly end of Miguel Fleta Street.

Access from the outside is through two separate entrances for each mode of transportation, without any connection inside the station. Each service has an island platform with tracks on each side.

== History ==
The station opened in 2007.
