= Jacint Verdaguer station =

Jacint Verdaguer

General information
- Location: Jacint Verdaguer Street, Palma, Majorca; Balearic Islands, Spain
- Coordinates: 39°34′50″N 2°39′39″E
- Operator: Consorci de Transports de Mallorca (CTM)
- Tracks: 2 + 2

Construction
- Structure type: Underground
- Accessible: yes

History
- Opened: 2006 Train; 2007 Metro

Services
Preceding station	Serveis Ferroviaris de Mallorca	Following station
Palma Intermodal Terminus	T1 Weekends	Son Costa / Son Fortesa towards Inca
Palma Intermodal Terminus	T2 Weekends	Son Costa / Son Fortesa towards Sa Pobla
Palma Intermodal Terminus	T3 Weekends	Son Costa / Son Fortesa towards Manacor
Preceding station	Palma Metro	Following station
Palma Intermodal Terminus	M1	Son Costa / Son Fortesa towards Parc Bit
Palma Intermodal Terminus	M2	Son Costa / Son Fortesa towards Marratxí
Location

Jacint Verdaguer is an underground station of Serveis Ferroviaris de Mallorca (SFM) and Palma Metro in Palma on the island of Majorca, Spain. The station is located under Jacint Verdaguer Street between Jaume Balmes Street and Plaça de Santa Elisabet.

There are two island platforms, one for each service.
