= Son Sardina metro station =

Railway station in Palma, Spain

Son Sardina

General information
- Location: Palma, Majorca; Balearic Islands, Spain
- Coordinates: 39°37′14″N 2°39′41″E
- Operator: Consorci de Transports de Mallorca (CTM)
- Connections: Ferrocarril de Sóller

Construction
- Structure type: At grade
- Accessible: yes

History
- Opened: 2007

Services
Preceding station	Palma Metro	Following station
Camí dels Reis towards Palma Intermodal	M1	UIB towards Parc Bit
Location

Son Sardina is a station on the Palma Metro. It is located in the northerly neighborhood of Son Sardina in Palma on the island of Majorca, Spain.

The above ground open-air station lies parallel to Highway Ma-11 and also serves the adjacent Ferrocarril de Sóller line going to the town of Sóller.

The metro station was opened 25 April 2007 and includes an adjacent free car park.
