= Camí dels Reis metro station =

Railway station in Palma, Spain

Camí dels Reis

General information
- Location: Palma, Majorca; Balearic Islands, Spain
- Coordinates: 39°36′37″N 2°39′55″E
- Operator: Consorci de Transports de Mallorca (CTM)
- Platforms: 2 side platforms
- Tracks: 2

Construction
- Structure type: Underground
- Accessible: yes

History
- Opened: 2007

Services
Preceding station	Palma Metro	Following station
Gran Vía Asima towards Palma Intermodal	M1	Son Sardina towards Parc Bit
Location

Camí dels Reis is a station of the Palma Metro in Palma on the island of Majorca, Spain.

The underground station, which opened 25 April 2007, is located at the northerly end of Gran Via Asima near Camí dels Reis after which it is named.
