= Son Castelló metro station =

Railway station in Palma, Spain

Son Castelló
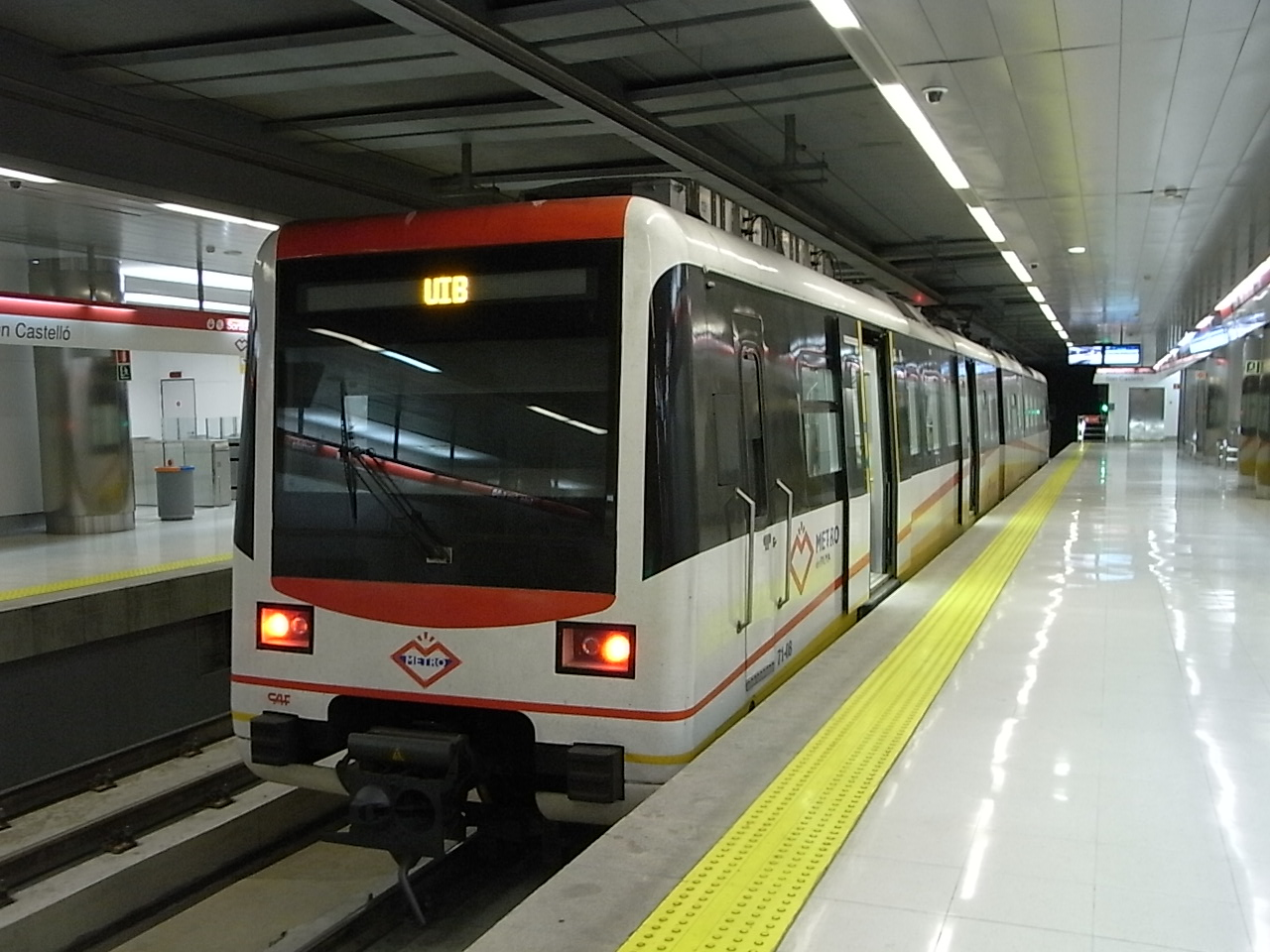

General information
- Location: Palma, Majorca; Balearic Islands, Spain
- Coordinates: 39°36′09″N 2°40′19″E
- Operator: Consorci de Transports de Mallorca (CTM)
- Platforms: 2 side platforms
- Tracks: 2

Construction
- Structure type: Underground
- Accessible: yes

History
- Opened: 2007

Services
Preceding station	Palma Metro	Following station
Son Fuster Vell towards Palma Intermodal	M1	Gran Vía Asima towards Parc Bit
Location

Son Castelló is a station of the Palma Metro in Palma on the island of Majorca, Spain.

The underground station, which opened 25 April 2007, is located at the southern end of Gran Via Asima in the Son Castelló industrial area, from which it takes its name.
