= Parc Bit =

Coordinates: 39.6378°N 2.6310°E

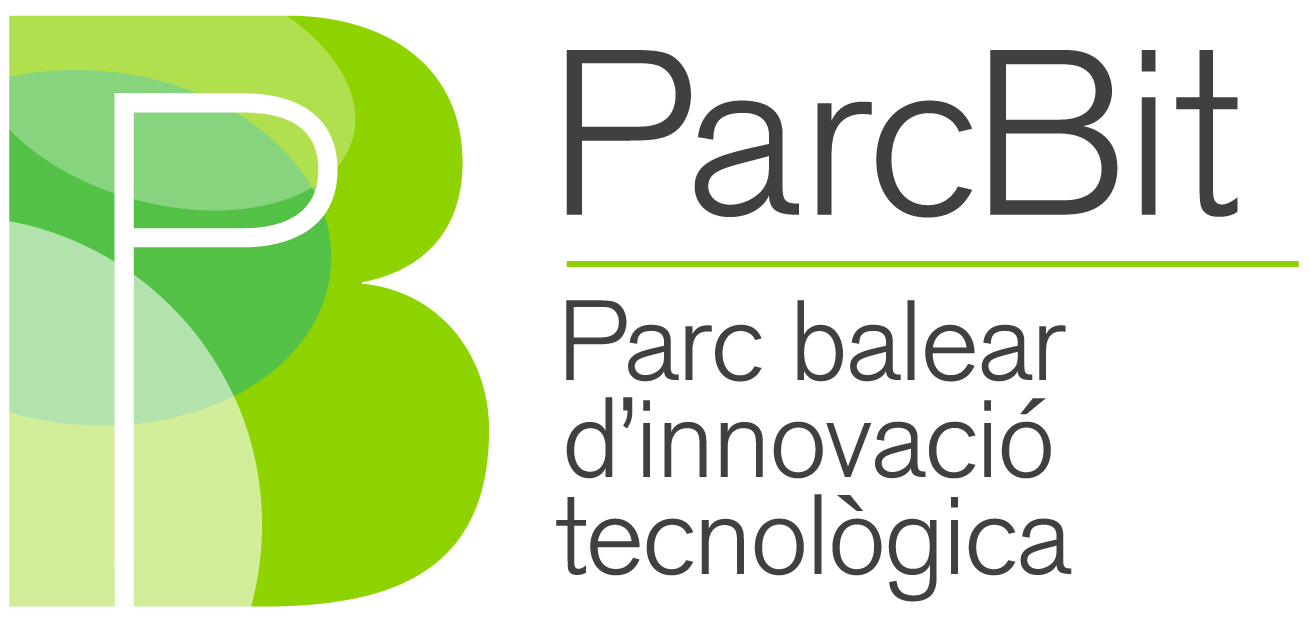

The Parc Bit is a science and technology park located in the outskirts of the city of Palma de Mallorca, Spain. Many innovation research centres of enterprises related with tourism are placed here, such as Trivago or Microsoft.

It was opened in 2002 and currently around 2,500 employees work there. It is located near the University of the Balearic Islands.

Parc Bit metro station of Palma Metro, which is located in the park and derives the name from it, was opened on 2 July 2025 as a one-station extension from UIB. It serves as the northern terminus of the line.
