= Son Fuster Vell metro station =

Railway station in Palma, Spain

Son Fuster Vell

General information
- Location: Palma, Majorca; Balearic Islands, Spain
- Coordinates: 39°35′43″N 2°40′17″E
- Operator: Consorci de Transports de Mallorca (CTM)
- Platforms: 2 side platforms
- Tracks: 2

Construction
- Structure type: Underground
- Accessible: yes

History
- Opened: 2007

Services
Preceding station	Palma Metro	Following station
Son Costa / Son Fortesa towards Palma Intermodal	M1	Son Castelló towards Parc Bit
Location

Son Fuster Vell is a station of the Palma Metro in Palma on the island of Majorca, Spain.

The underground station, which opened 25 April 2007, is located beside Camí Vell de Bunyola.
