= Gran Vía Asima metro station =

Railway station in Palma, Spain

Gran Vía Asima

General information
- Location: Palma, Majorca; Balearic Islands, Spain
- Coordinates: 39°36′23″N 2°40′07″E
- Operator: Consorci de Transports de Mallorca (CTM)
- Platforms: 2 side platforms
- Tracks: 2

Construction
- Structure type: Underground
- Accessible: yes

History
- Opened: 2007

Services
Preceding station	Palma Metro	Following station
Son Castelló towards Palma Intermodal	M1	Camí dels Reis towards Parc Bit
Location

Gran Vía Asima is a station of the Palma Metro in Palma on the island of Majorca, Spain.

The underground station, which opened 25 April 2007, is located in Gran Via Asima, from which it gets its name. It is located in the centre of the Son Castelló industrial area.
