= Son Sardina =

Coordinates: 39.6192°N 2.6550°E

Son Sardina is a village and settlement of the city of Palma de Mallorca on the island of Majorca, part of the Spanish autonomous community of the Balearic Islands, administratively forming part of the city's North District.

The settlement can be reached by road via the Ma-11, and has several public transport connections, notably the Son Sardina metro station on the Palma Metro, and the adjacent station on the heritage tramway Tranvía de Sóller. It is also served by EMT bus lines 12 and 27.

The settlement contains two schools, CP Maria Antònia Salvà which is a primary school, and IES Son Pacs (formerly known as Instituto Virgen de Lluc) for secondary and sixth form ages.

The administrative borders of Son Sardina also include the small settlement of Sa Garriga, situated in the northern extremity of the settlement.
