= UIB metro station =

Railway station in Palma, Spain

UIB
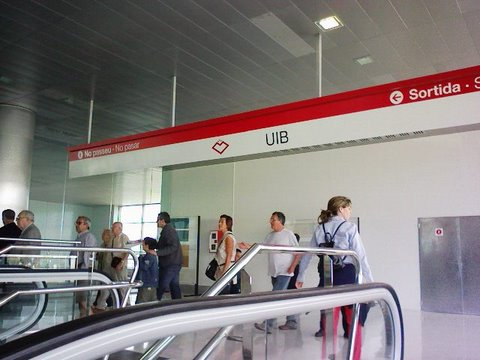

General information
- Location: Palma, Majorca; Balearic Islands, Spain
- Coordinates: 39°38′05″N 2°38′53″E
- Operator: Consorci de Transports de Mallorca (CTM)
- Connections: Bus

Construction
- Structure type: Underground
- Accessible: yes

History
- Opened: 2007

Services
Preceding station	Palma Metro	Following station
Son Sardina towards Palma Intermodal	M1	Parc Bit Terminus
Location

UIB is a station on the Palma Metro. It is situated on the south side of the main campus of University of the Balearic Islands (Catalan: Universitat de les Illes Balears, UIB), which is located in northern part of Palma on the island of Majorca, Spain.

The station, which was opened 25 April 2007 by Catalina Cirer, mayor of Palma de Mallorca, was the northerly terminus of the line until 2 July 2025. On that day, a one-station extension to Parc Bit, the new northern terminus of the line, was opened.
