= Serveis Ferroviaris de Mallorca =

Railway operator in Mallorca, Spain

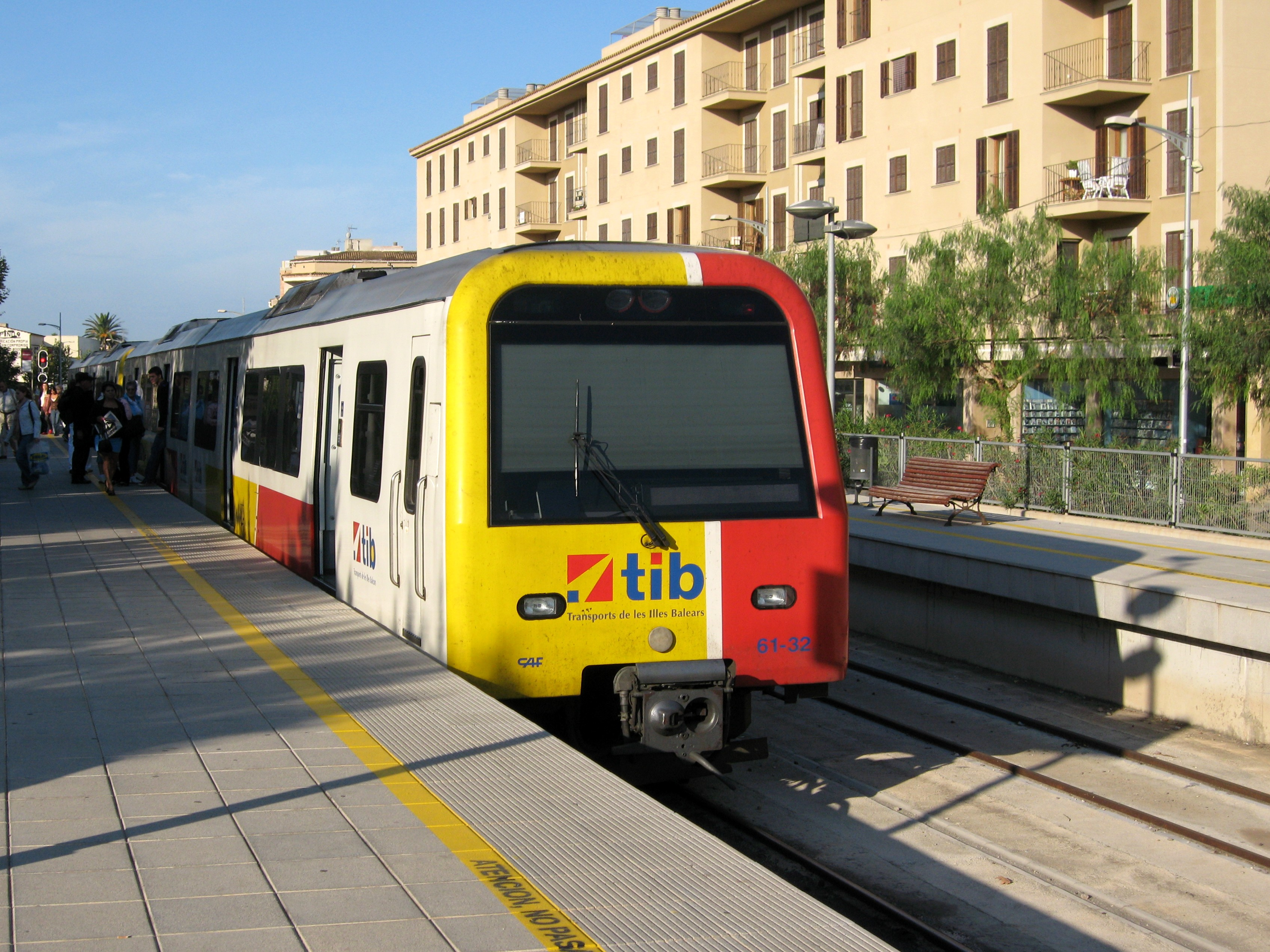

Overview
- Locale: Mallorca
- Number of lines: 3
- Number of stations: 29
- Annual ridership: 4.8 million (2019)

Operation
- Began operation: 1994

Technical
- System length: 85 km (52.82 mi)
- Track gauge: 1,000 mm (3 ft 3 3/8 in) metre gauge

Serveis Ferroviaris de Mallorca (Catalan pronunciation: [səɾˈvəjs fəroviˈaɾiz ðə məˈʎɔɾkə]) or SFM is a company which operates the metre gauge railway network on the Spanish island of Mallorca. The total length, including Palma Metro, also operated by this company, is 85 km (53 mi).

== Overview ==
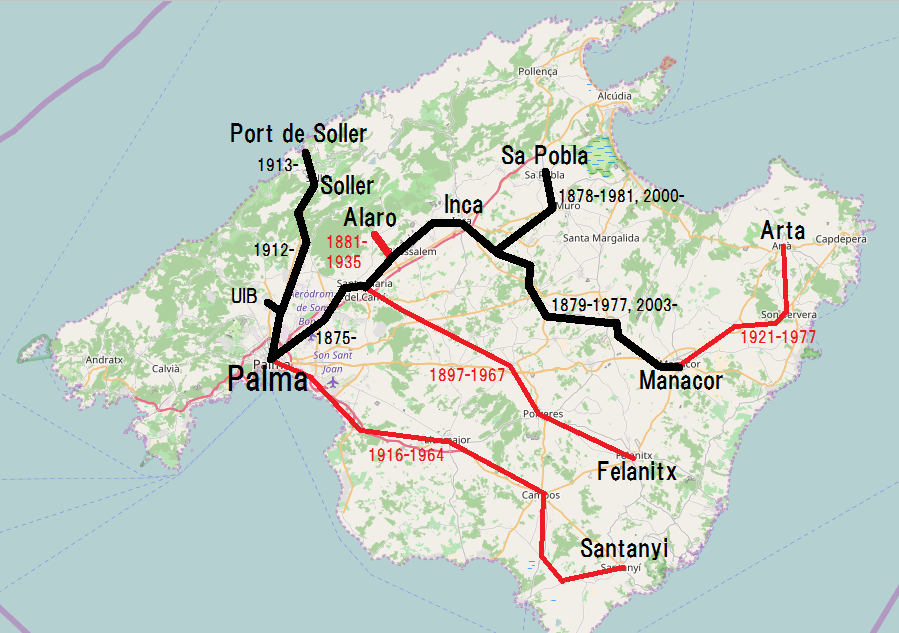
Mallorca historic rail map

In 1977, the line Palma – Inca was the sole remnant of a network that once connected Palma with most of the island. In 2001, the section Inca – Sa Pobla reopened, followed by the section Inca – Sineu in 2002 and Sineu – Manacor in 2003.

The expected extension of the branch line from Sa Pobla onwards to Alcúdia in 2005 has yet to be built.

The line from Manacor to Artà was under construction for a planned 2012 reopening. The project was halted in 2013 (with most of the groundwork completed) and an announcement made that the route instead was to be converted "for the time being") to a via verde for cyclists and walkers.

== Electrification ==
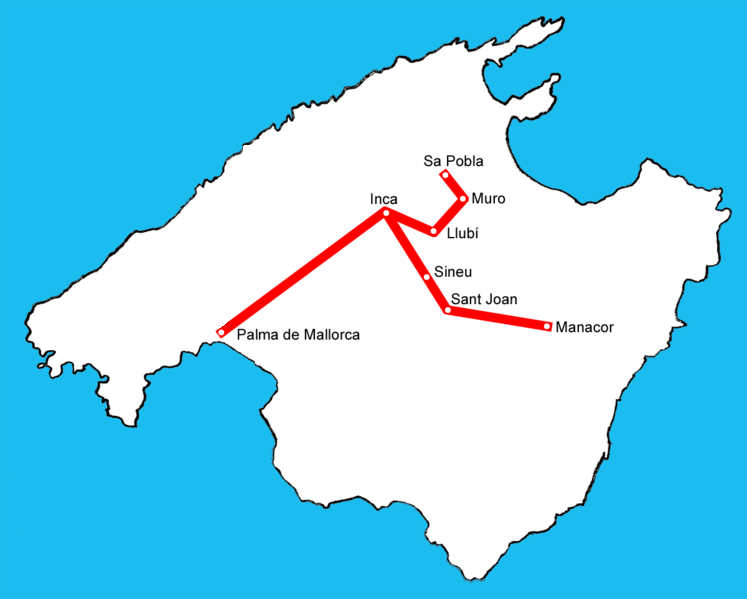
SFM line

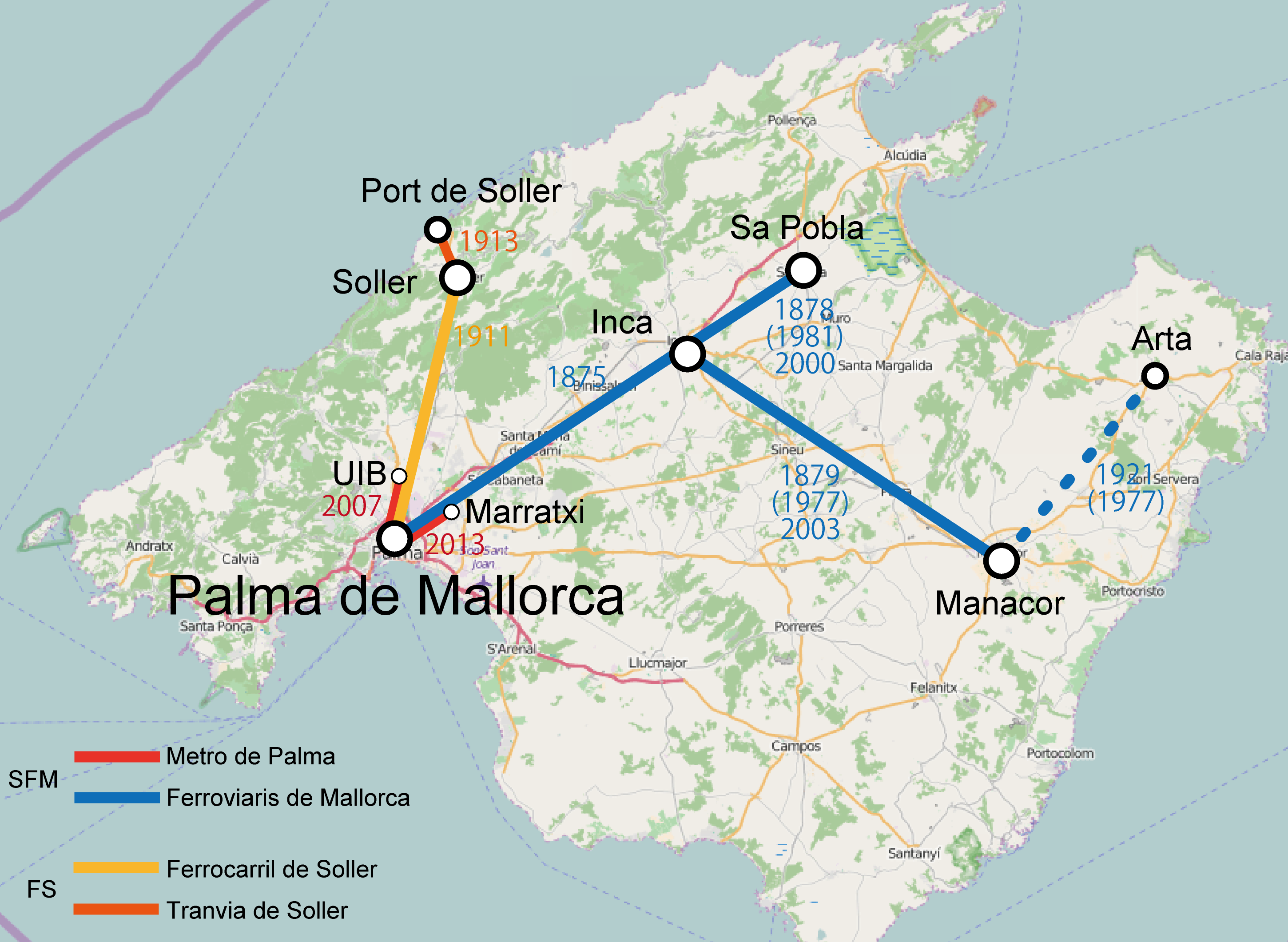
Mallorca current rail map

€30m was invested in electrifying the whole line, from Palma to Inca, at 1.5 kV DC, which was completed in 2011. CAF EMUs have been purchased; these displaced diesel vehicles, which were then sold to Overview LDA and to Kenya Railways for use on suburban services in Nairobi.

== See also ==
- Ferrocarril de Sóller (FS)
- FEVE
- Mallorca rail network
- Rail transport in Spain
- Transport in Spain
- Tranvía de Sóller
