= Palma Metro =

Metro system in Palma, Spain

Coordinates: 39.5764°N 2.6548°E

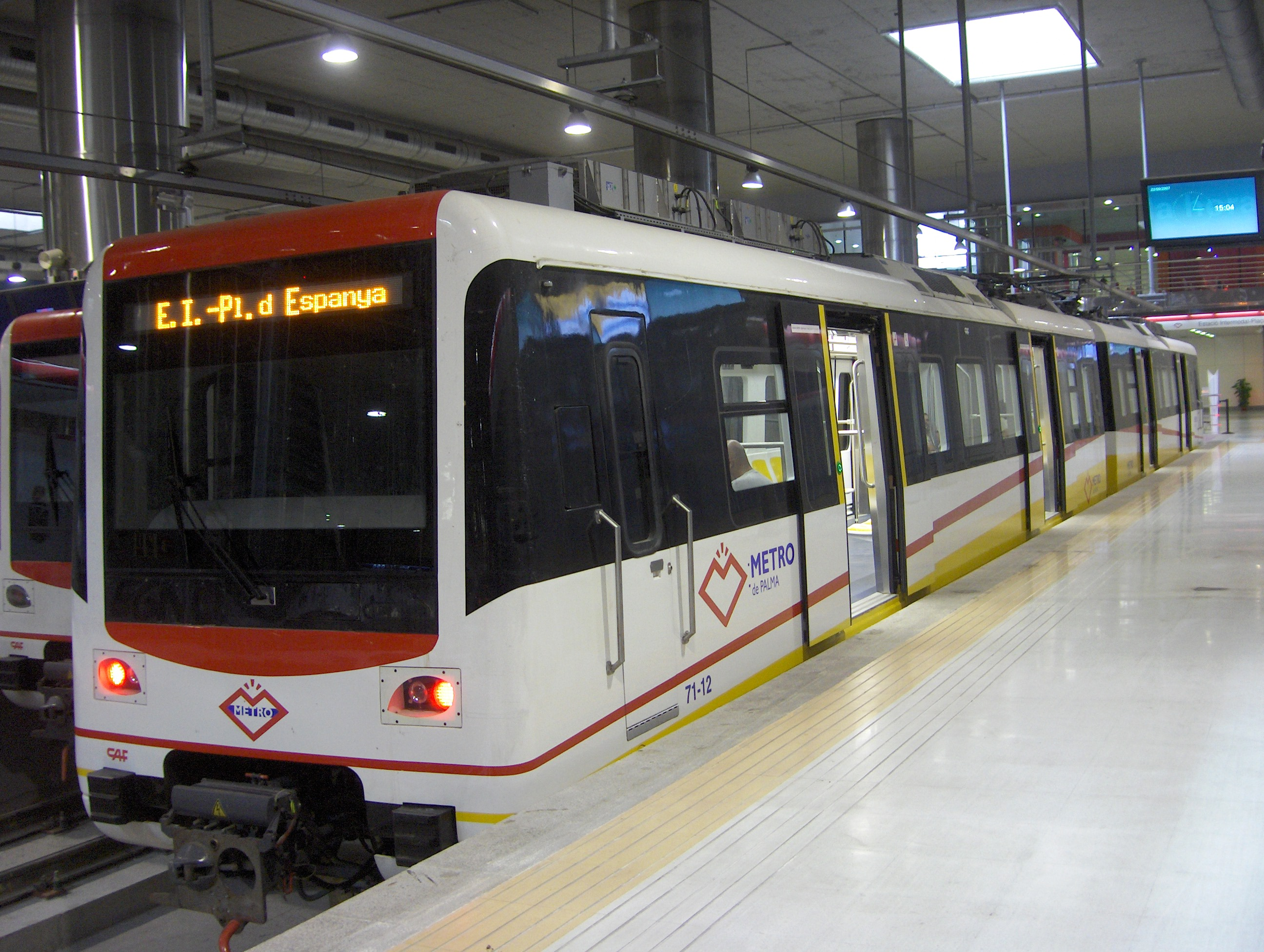

Overview
- Locale: Palma, Mallorca, Spain
- Transit type: Rapid transit/Light metro
- Number of lines: 1
- Number of stations: 10
- Annual ridership: 1.3 million (2019)
- Website: http://www.tib.org/portal/web/ctm/metro

Operation
- Began operation: 25 April 2007
- Operator: SFM
- Number of vehicles: CAF Series 71 & 81
- Train length: 2-3 cars
- Headway: 20-30 minutes

Technical
- System length: 9.9 km (6.2 mi)
- Track gauge: 1,000 mm (3 ft 3 3/8 in) metre gauge
- Electrification: 1,500 V DC from overhead catenary
- Top speed: 100 km/h (62 mph)

Network map of Palma Metro (excluding Parc Bit station)

The Palma Metro (Catalan: Metro de Palma, Spanish: Metro de Palma [de Mallorca]) is a light metro system in Palma de Mallorca, Spain. The system is operated by the Consorci de Transports de Mallorca (CTM).

As of 2025, the system consists of a single 9.9-kilometre-long (6.2 mi) line, the M1, with ten stations, linking Palma's city centre with the University of the Balearic Islands on the edge of the city. Between 2013 and 2022 there existed a second line, the M2, which ran between Palma and the town of Marratxí.

In 2019, the Palma Metro carried 1.3 million passengers.

== History ==
Construction began in 2005 and the line fully opened to passengers on 25 April 2007. The project had cost 312 million euros. However, the line was forced to suspend its operations just five months after opening, due to repeated flooding in the tunnels. Services restarted on 28 July 2008 after a 46% cost overrun.

In November 2012, the CTM announced that a second metro line would be added to the system, operating on a route that would serve ten stations between Palma's city centre and Marratxí station (inclusive). Revenue service on this new line, dubbed the M2, began on 13 March 2013. The M2 shared all its track with the already-existing mainline that links Palma with Inca, Sa Pobla and Manacor; as such, the work necessary to launch the line was minimal. The line was discontinued on 29 April 2022; since then, the intermediate stations between Palma and Marratxí have instead been served by the mainline trains.

On 2 July 2025, a one-station extension from UIB to Parc Bit was opened.

== Route and services ==
The M1 line has 10 stations. From south to north, these are: Palma Intermodal–Plaça d'Espanya, Jacint Verdaguer, Son Costa–Son Fortesa, Son Fuster Vell, Son Castelló, Gran Vía Asima, Camí dels Reis, Son Sardina, UIB, and Parc Bit.

The first three stations are also served by mainline services (and were formerly served by the M2). Furthermore, Palma Intermodal–Plaça d'Espanya station, in the city centre, is Mallorca's main transport hub – in addition to the metro and mainline services, this interchange also features: a large underground bus station, which is used by interurban buses to towns and villages all over Mallorca; a series of surface-level bus stops used by Palma's urban bus network; and a separate surface-level station used by the Sóller heritage railway. The latter also connects with the Metro at Son Sardina station.

The majority of the line is in underground tunnels; the only exceptions are a short section of track around Son Sardina station and an even shorter stretch at Parc Bit, both of which run on the surface.

On weekdays, services on the M1 run between approximately 6:30 and 22:00; during university term times, the service pattern on the line consists of a train every 20 minutes in each direction throughout most of the day (with marginally more frequent services in the morning peak), while during the holiday period this is reduced to every 30-40 minutes. On Saturdays, trains run between 7:00 and 15:00, with frequencies of every 30 minutes during term time and every 60 minutes otherwise. There is no Sunday service.

Services on the line have an end-to-end journey time of 15 minutes.

== Future expansion ==
As early as 2005, prior to the opening of the metro, future extensions were proposed, including from Estació Intermodal to the Port of Palma, using an old tunnel underneath the city.

=== Son Espases University Hospital ===
A 2.1 km branch from Camí dels Reis station to the Son Espases University Hospital was proposed in 2019.
