= Mallorca rail network =

Railway line in Spain

Coordinates: 39.57622°N 2.65440°E

The Mallorca rail network consists of three separate electrified lines, which radiate north and east from Palma de Mallorca, the major city on the Spanish island of Mallorca.

Services on the main line and metro both originate/terminate at the Estació Intermodal/Plaça d'Espanya station (Palma Intermodal Station), which opened in 2007. This vast subterranean terminus is also served by the island's extensive inter-urban bus network.

Services on the tourist railway from Sóller terminate at the adjacent surface level station on Carrer Eusebi Estada.

== History ==
All of the lines on the island were originally 3 ft (914 mm) narrow gauge lines. All, except for the lines run by Ferrocarril de Sóller S.A., have since been converted to 1,000 mm (3 ft 3 3/8 in) metre gauge.

== The lines ==
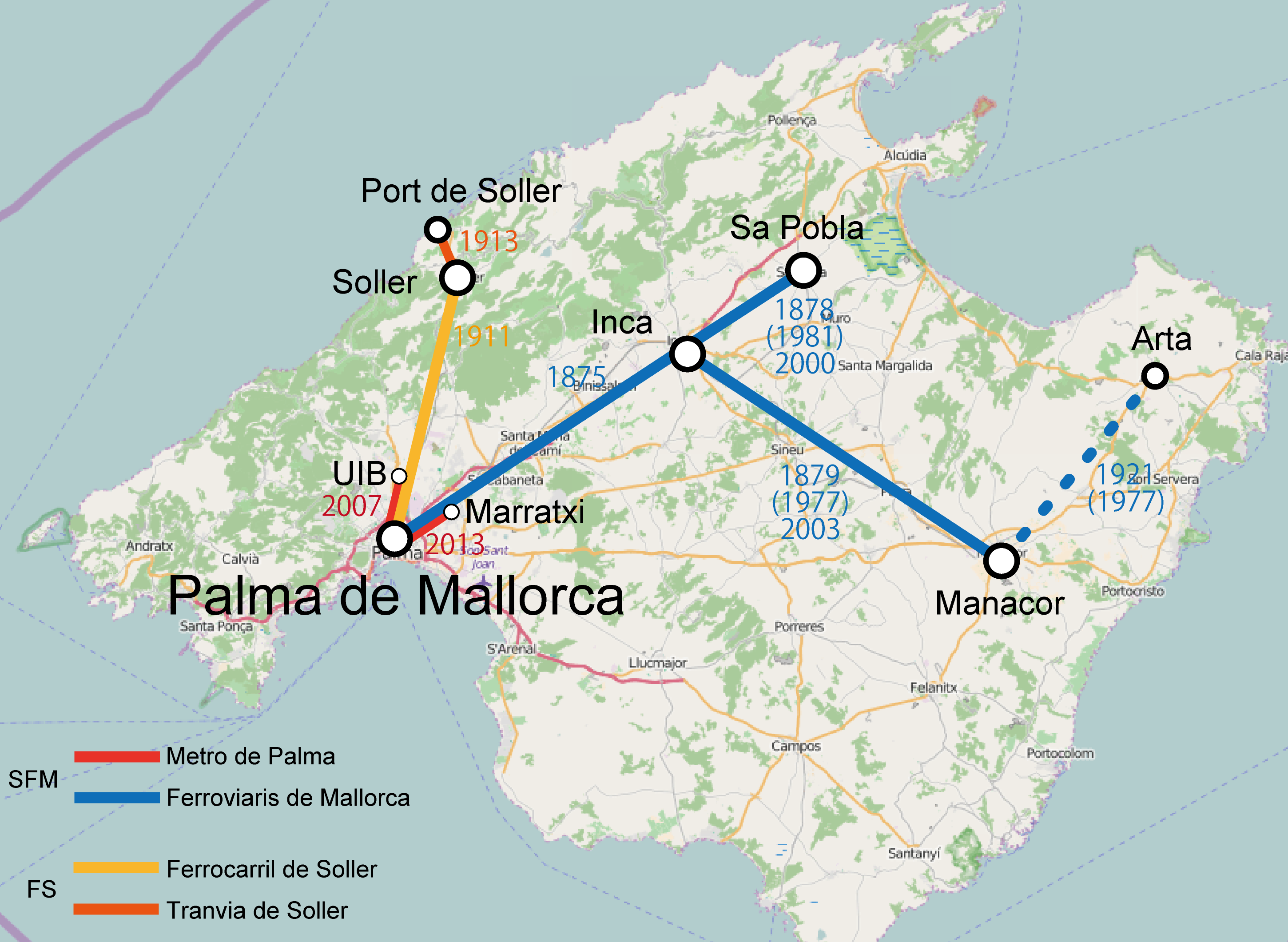
Mallorca current rail map

Transport de les Illes Balears

Services on both the metro and main line are operated by Transport de les Illes Balears. (Transport on the Balearic Islands).

=== Metro ===
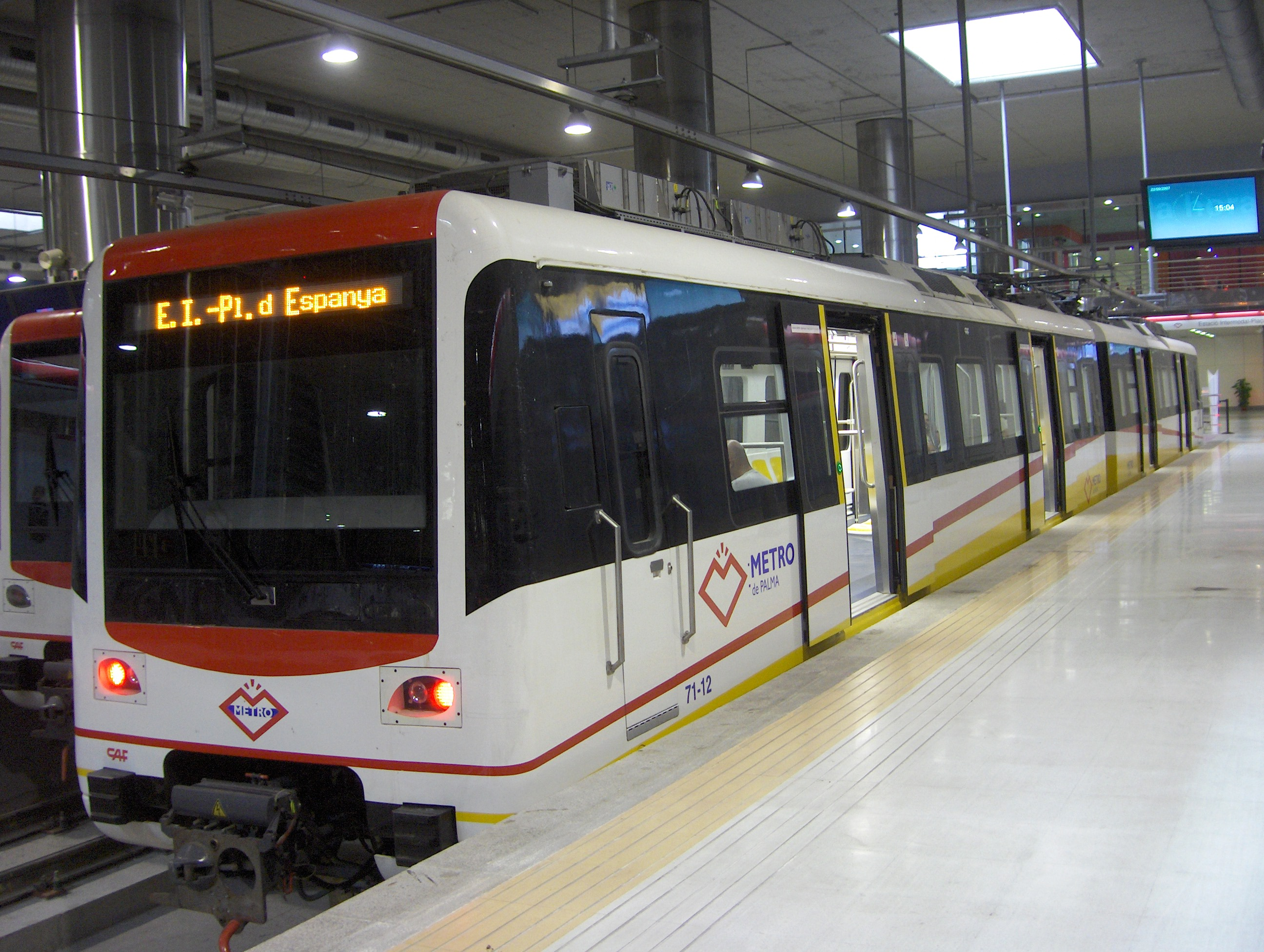

Metro trains start from Platforms 1-4 at Palma Intermodal Station, where they interchange with services on the main line. A connection between the two networks allows access for engineering purposes.

The Metro was constructed between 2005 and 2007 at cost of €312 million. Line M1 terminates at UIB University of the Balearic Islands station, with services from Palma calling at seven intermediate stops in the city's northern suburbs. Line M2 runs east alongside the main line and serves seven intermediate stations before terminating at the suburban station of Marratxí.

On both routes trains operate daily from approximately 06:30 to 22:00, with a 15-minute service during the day; reducing to 30 minutes in the early morning, late evening and on Sundays.

=== Main line ===
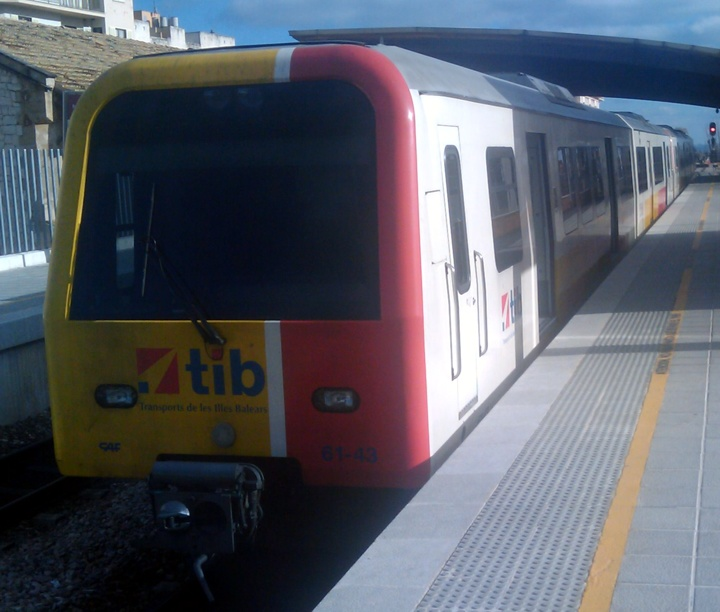
Train at Inca

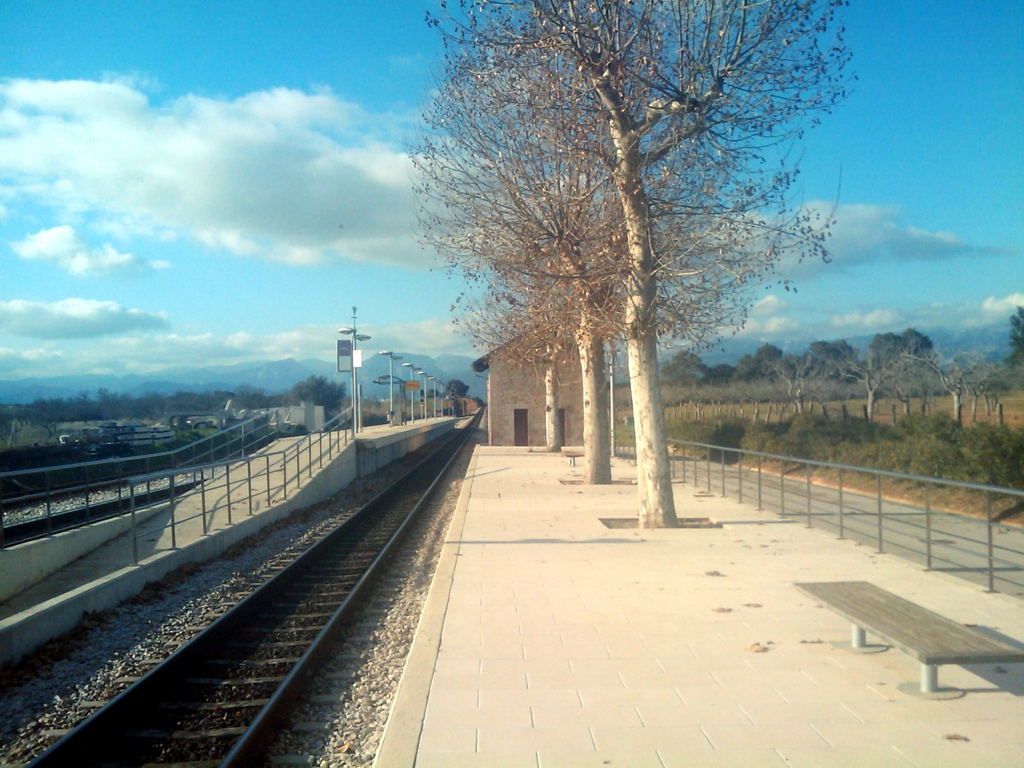
Remote Enllaç station

Services to Manacor and Sa Pobla via Marratxí and Inca start from Platforms 5-10 at Palma Intermodal Station. This modern facility lies beneath the Parc de ses Estacions, which occupies land formerly used by the former surface level lines. The landscaped gardens contain several former railway buildings, and the original station buildings also survive alongside Plaça d'Espanya.

Today the main line runs below ground until just after Son Costa/Son Fortesa station. It is grade separated along its entire length, aside from some very minor level crossings in remote rural areas. The section from El Caülls (Festival Park) to Inca offers excellent views of the Serra de Tramuntana mountain range to the north.

The line is double-track from the capital to the remote halt at Enllaç, where the branches to Manacor and Sa Pobla diverge. The line to Manacor has passing places at Sineu and Petra, but the shorter Sa Pobla branch is single track throughout.

Between 05:45 and 23:20 there are two trains each hour in each direction alternatively providing connections to the two eastern termini, whilst a third service operates only as far as Inca. From Monday to Saturday in 2013, Manacor trains operated non-stop as far as Marratxí. On Sundays and public holidays, only two trains per hour operate in each direction, providing stops at all stations to Manacor or Sa Pobla. In the 2017 timetable, four-car electric trains ran every half-hour between Palma and Enllac, with two-car diesel unit connections alternatively on the non-electrified branches to/from Sa Pobla and Manacor. A few rush-hour express services were also advertised.

In 2013 civil engineering work had started on the extension of the Manacor line to Artà via Sant Llorenç des Cardassar and Son Servera, but work on the proposed extension of the Sa Pobla branch to Alcudia had not commenced. By May 2014, there was no indication of any such work within Manacor itself which now has a relocated terminal station, adjacent to the main covered shopping centre. The trackbed of the former line past Cala Millor to Artà was either removed or in the process of being converted to sections of footpaths / cycleways. Most stations had been demolished although the one at Artà is now a privately owned shed.

Electrification was completed to Sa Pobla in July 2017 and to Manacor in November 2018.

=== Signalling ===
Three–aspect colour–light signalling is in use along the lines, with red in the middle, yellow at the bottom and green at the top. Smaller aspect lenses on many of the signals provide shunt indications.

A careful look at ground level will show point indications – these are small illuminated LED arrows pointing vertically upwards for straight on or to the left or right for point diverges

=== Ferrocarril de Sóller ===
Ferrocarril de Sóller S.A. is a privately owned company, which since 1912 has operated a passenger service along the 27.3 km (17.0 mi) line between Palma de Mallorca and Sóller. From 1913 it has also run the Tranvía de Sóller tram service along the 4.9 km (3.0 mi) route from Sóller to the Port of Sóller. The track for both services is 3 ft (914 mm).

== Future expansion ==
The Balearic Islands government's 2019-2026 transport plan details plans to extend the rail network to Alcúdia, Artà, Cala Ratjada, Llucmajor and Felanitx.

=== Trams in Palma de Mallorca ===
A tram/light rail line is planned to link Hospital de Son Espases to its airport.

== See also ==
- Tranvía de Sóller
