= Ferrocarril de Sóller =

Railway

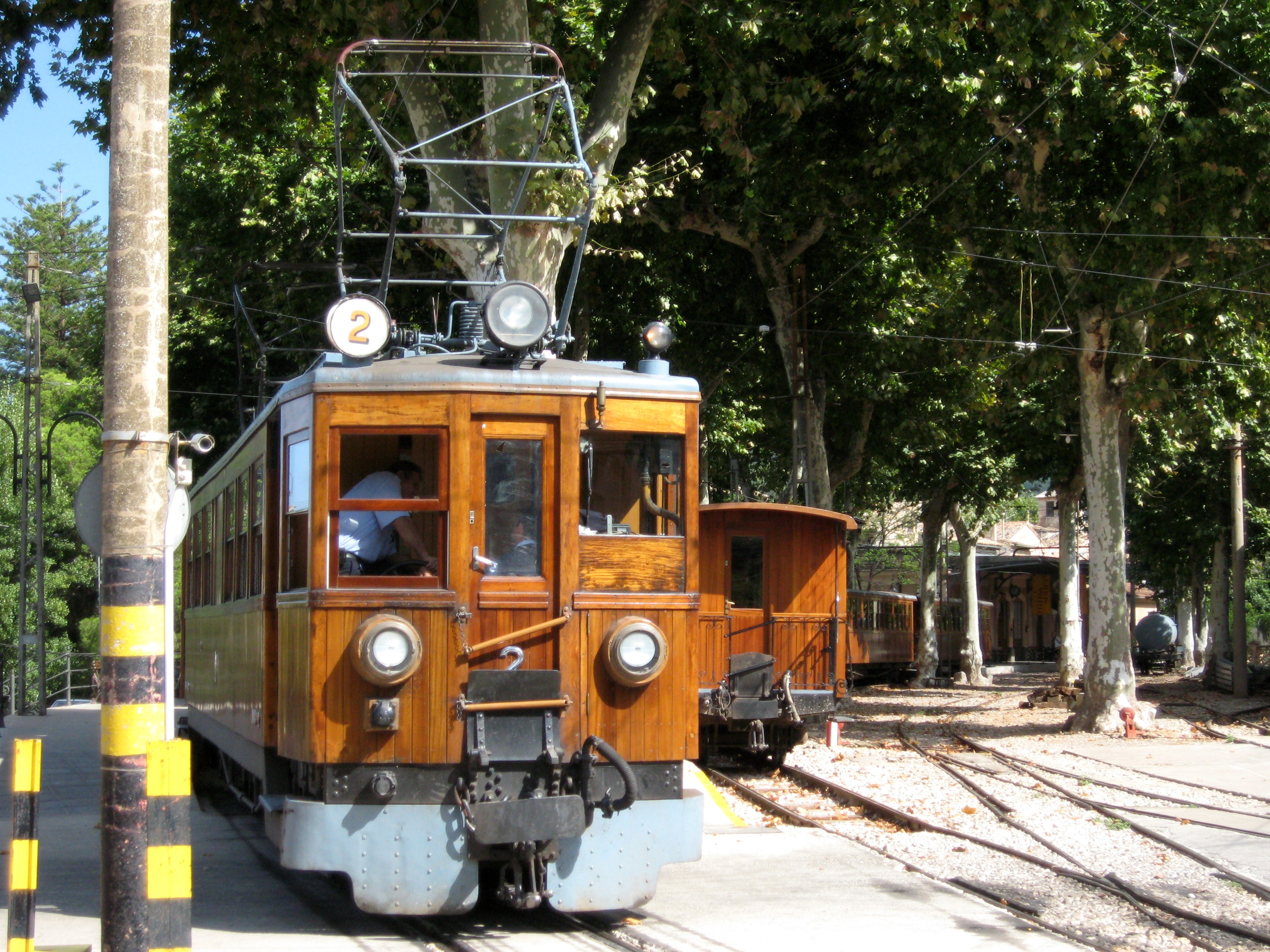

Overview
- Locale: Mallorca
- Termini: Palma; Sóller

Service
- Type: Interurban
- Ridership: 1 million a year

History
- Opened: 16 April 1912

Technical
- Line length: 27 km (17 mi)
- Track gauge: 3 ft (914 mm)
- Minimum radius: 185 m (607 ft)
- Electrification: 1200 V DC overhead lines, 600 V motors

The Ferrocarril de Sóller (Balearic Catalan: [ˌfɛrukəˈril də ˈsoʎə]; English: Railway of Sóller), acronym FS, is an interurban railway and the name for the company which operates the electrified 3 ft (914 mm) narrow-gauge tracks running between the towns of Sóller and Palma on the Spanish island of Mallorca (stopping at various smaller towns such as Bunyola and Son Sardina).

The historic electric train takes a route north from the capital across the plains, winding through mountains and 13 tunnels of the Serra de Tramuntana, finally ending in the railway station of the northern town of Sóller.

Work began on the railway in 1911 on the profits of the orange and lemon trade, which at the time was booming. For this reason, it is sometimes known as the Orange Express. The railway was officially opened on 16 April 1912.

The train is now not only a mode of transport between these two key Mallorcan settlements, but also an attraction in itself, in 2019 carrying over 1 million passengers a year.

Single tickets between Palma and Sóller cost €23 in 2026 (2018: €18), and returns are €30 (2018: €25). The return ticket from Palma can be extended with a return ticket on the Sóller tram for an additional €10 (2018: €7), which represents a 50% saving, since the onboard tram fare is €10 (2018: €7) each way.

== Palma railway station ==
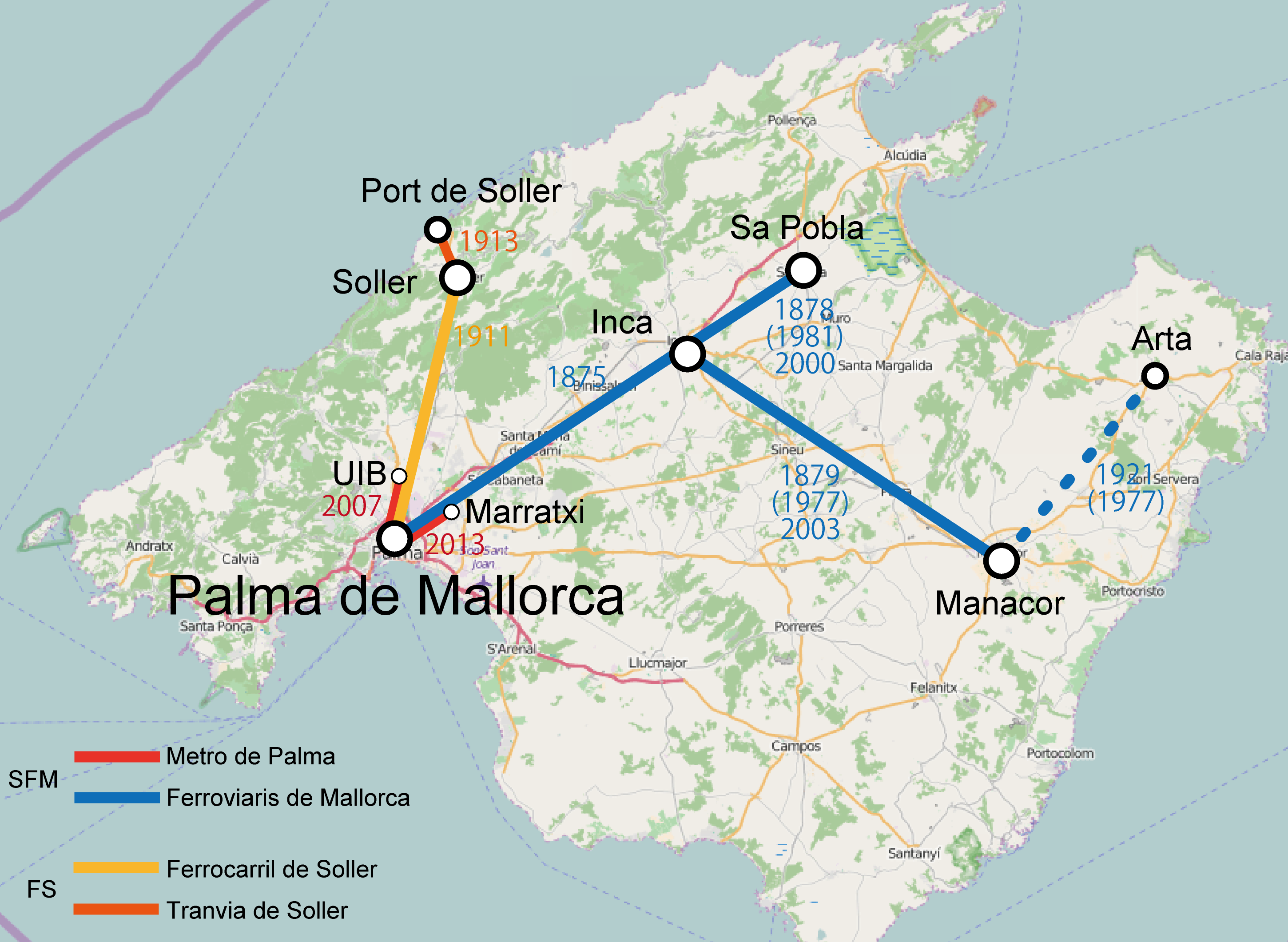
Mallorca Island Railway Network

Palma Railway Station (Coordinates: 39°34′36″N 2°39′14″E) is a subtle, relatively small brown brick building with a large "Ferrocarril de Sóller" sign on its façade, partly given up to a museum, cleverly renovated so that the large glass windows reflect the railway tracks to make them look as if they go on into the rooms. The station is just off the Plaça de Espanya and borders a large and popular park which lies on top of the underground Estació Intermodal. Several old railway buildings (one with a large brick chimney) lie untouched in the park and there are several train-themed play structures, each one a carriage named after a settlement along the line.

== Sóller railway station ==
Sóller Railway Station (Coordinates: 39°45′53″N 2°42′54″E) on the other hand is much larger, developed from a fortified house dating from 1606, Ca'n Mayol. The station is also home to the tram which runs from Sóller to Port de Sóller and (inside the building) a museum dedicated to the works of Picasso and Joan Miró.

== Locomotives and Rolling Stock ==
Construction of the railway took place using a British steam tram locomotive, which was joined by three 2-6-0T locomotives for opening of the railway, soon followed by a fourth similar one. By the 1920s, it was found that steam power was inadequate for the gradients, due to increasing train loads, therefore a decision was made to install 1200V dc overhead line electrification, together with the purchase of four motor coaches.

A diesel locomotive was purchased in the 1960s and two road lorries were converted for track and overhead line maintenance and inspection work.

Further details of the railway’s motive power are given below:

=== Steam Locomotives ===
Name	No.	Type	Builder	Works No.	Date built	In service	Disposal
Maria Luisa		Tram locomotive	Falcon Works, Loughborough	198	c.1891	1911-1929	Scrapped, 1944
Soller	1	2-6-0T	La Maquinista, Barcelona	58	1912	1912-1929	To Ferrocarril de Mallorca, 1944
Palma	2	2-6-0T	La Maquinista, Barcelona	59	1912	1912-1929	To Ferrocarril de Mallorca, 1944
Bunyola	3	2-6-0T	La Maquinista, Barcelona	60	1912	1912-1929	To Ferrocarril de Mallorca, 1944
Son Sardina	4	2-6-0T	La Maquinista, Barcelona	65	1913	1912-1929	Scrapped, 1944

=== Electric Locomotives and Motor Coaches ===
No.	Type	Builder	Date built	In service
1	1200V dc bogie motor coach	Carde y Escoriaza, Zaragoza	1928-1929	1929 -present
2	1200V dc bogie motor coach	Carde y Escoriaza, Zaragoza	1928-1929	1929 -present
3	1200V dc bogie motor coach	Carde y Escoriaza, Zaragoza	1928-1929	1929 -present
4	1200V dc bogie motor coach	Carde y Escoriaza, Zaragoza	1928-1929	1929 -present
	B-B locomotive	Brown Boveri	1929	delivered 2000

=== Diesel Locomotive ===
No.	Type	Builder	Date built	Disposal
D-1	B-B diesel hydraulic locomotive	Ferrotrade	1968	Withdrawn by 2001

== 2019 anonymous takeover bid ==
In 2019 an anonymous group of investors launched a hostile €25m takeover bid for the railway, represented by Goros Investments. Most of the 172,000 shares in the private company are owned by about 800 local people. As of August 2019 a local tour operator and restaurateur and a company that runs boat trips around the north-east of the island are the two largest shareholders.

== See also ==
- Tranvía de Sóller
