= Parc Bit metro station =

Palma Metro station

Parc Bit

General information
- Location: Palma, Mallorca; Balearic Islands, Spain
- Coordinates: 39°38′04″N 2°38′11″E
- Operator: Consorci de Transports de Mallorca (CTM)

History
- Opened: 2025

Services
Preceding station	Palma Metro	Following station
UIB towards Palma Intermodal	M1	Terminus
Location

Parc Bit is a station on line M1 of the Palma Metro in the northern suburbs of the city of Palma de Mallorca on the island of Mallorca, Spain. It was opened on 2 July 2025 as a one-station extension from UIB and serves as the northern terminus of the line. The station is located in the technological park Parc Bit, from which it derives its name.

The 1.5 kilometres (0.93 mi) long extension from UIB, the previous terminus of the line, to Parc Bit science and technology park was agreed in 2019. It was originally due to open in 2020.
