= Palma Intermodal Station =

Railway station in Palma, Majorca, Spain

Palma Estació Intermodal
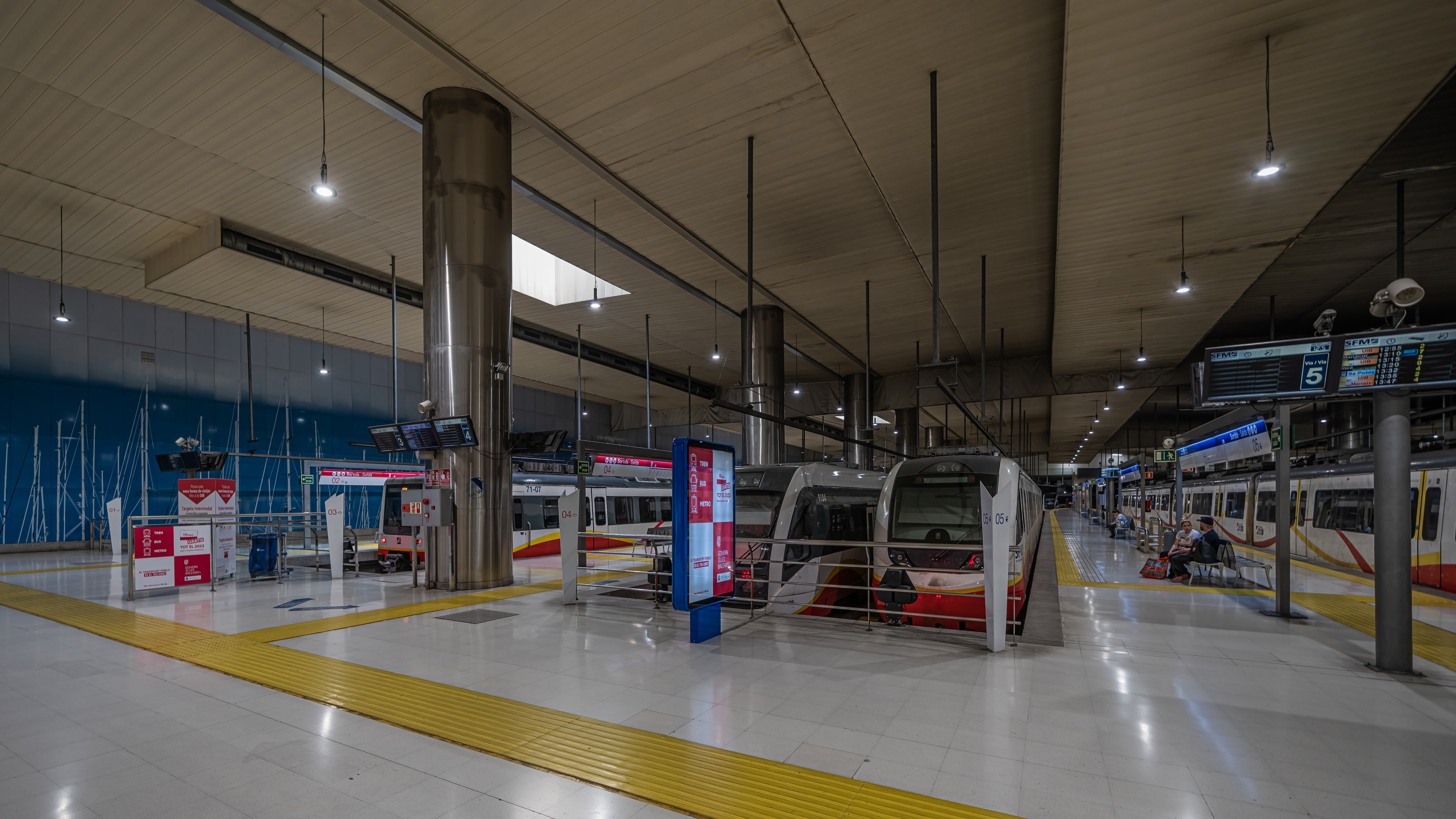
- Station platforms

General information
- Location: Plaça d'Espanya, Palma, Majorca; Balearic Islands, Spain
- Coordinates: 39°34′35″N 2°39′15.3″E
- Operator: Consorci de Transports de Mallorca (CTM)
- Connections: Bus

Construction
- Parking: 844 spaces
- Cycle facilities: 45 places
- Accessible: yes

History
- Opened: 2007

Services
Preceding station	Serveis Ferroviaris de Mallorca	Following station
Terminus	T1	Jacint Verdaguer towards Inca
Terminus	T2	Jacint Verdaguer towards Sa Pobla
Terminus	T3	Jacint Verdaguer towards Manacor
Preceding station	Palma Metro	Following station
Terminus	M1	Jacint Verdaguer towards Parc Bit
Terminus	M2	Jacint Verdaguer towards Marratxí
Location

Palma Intermodal Station (Catalan: Estació Intermodal) is the main railway station of Palma on the island of Majorca, Spain. It is located at the Plaça d'Espanya in the centre of the city and is also known as Palma Plaça d'Espanya.

== Overview ==
The facility was officially opened 1 March 2007, which is the "Day of the Balearic Islands", a local public holiday which celebrates the islands' autonomy. The Metro commenced operation 25 April 2007.

The station is fully accessible for persons with reduced mobility. Car parking and bicycle racks are available.

== Services ==
Trains of Serveis Ferroviaris de Mallorca and the Palma Metro both use the station. The Ferrocarril de Sóller station is on the other side of the street.

== Gallery ==
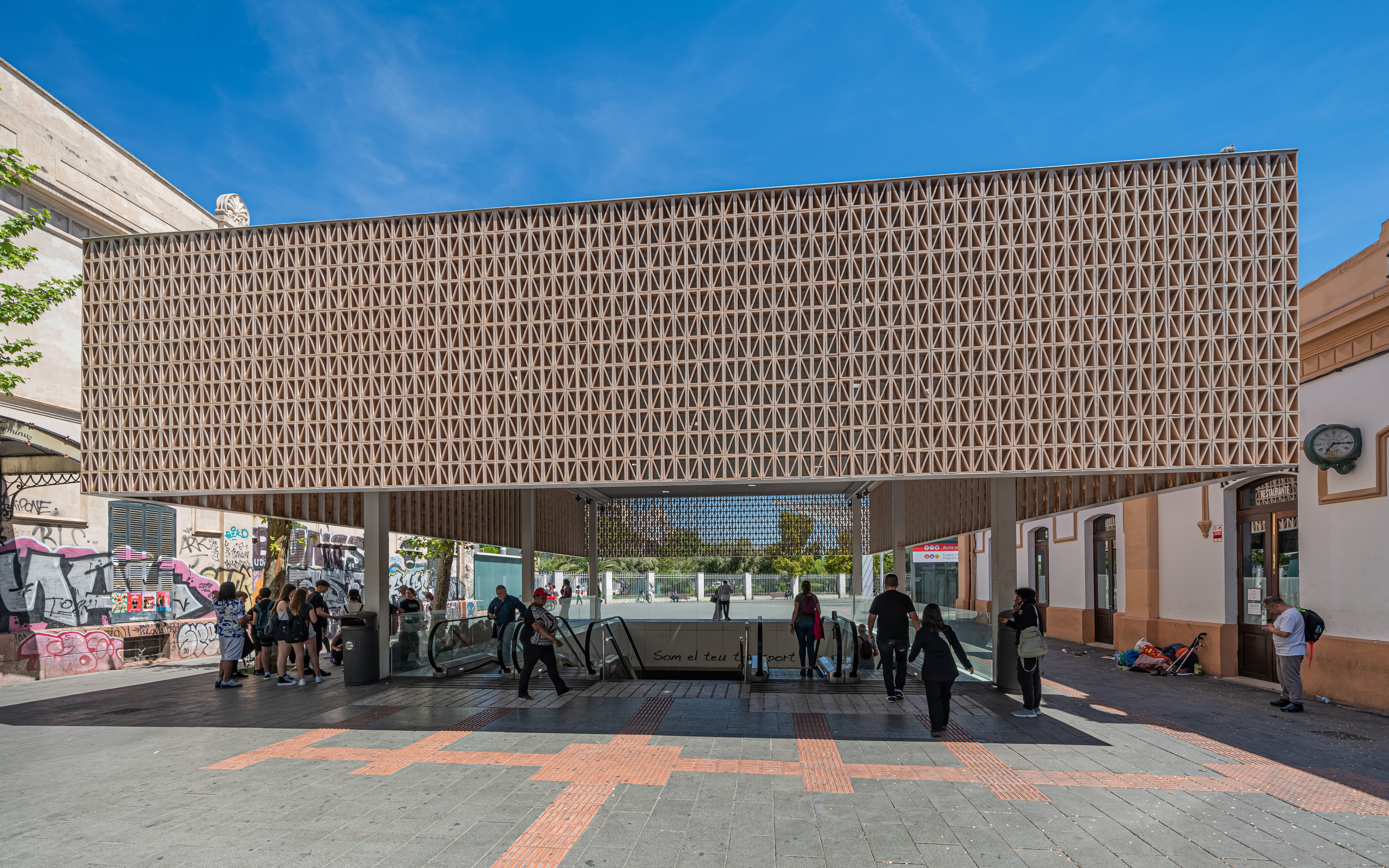
Station entrance

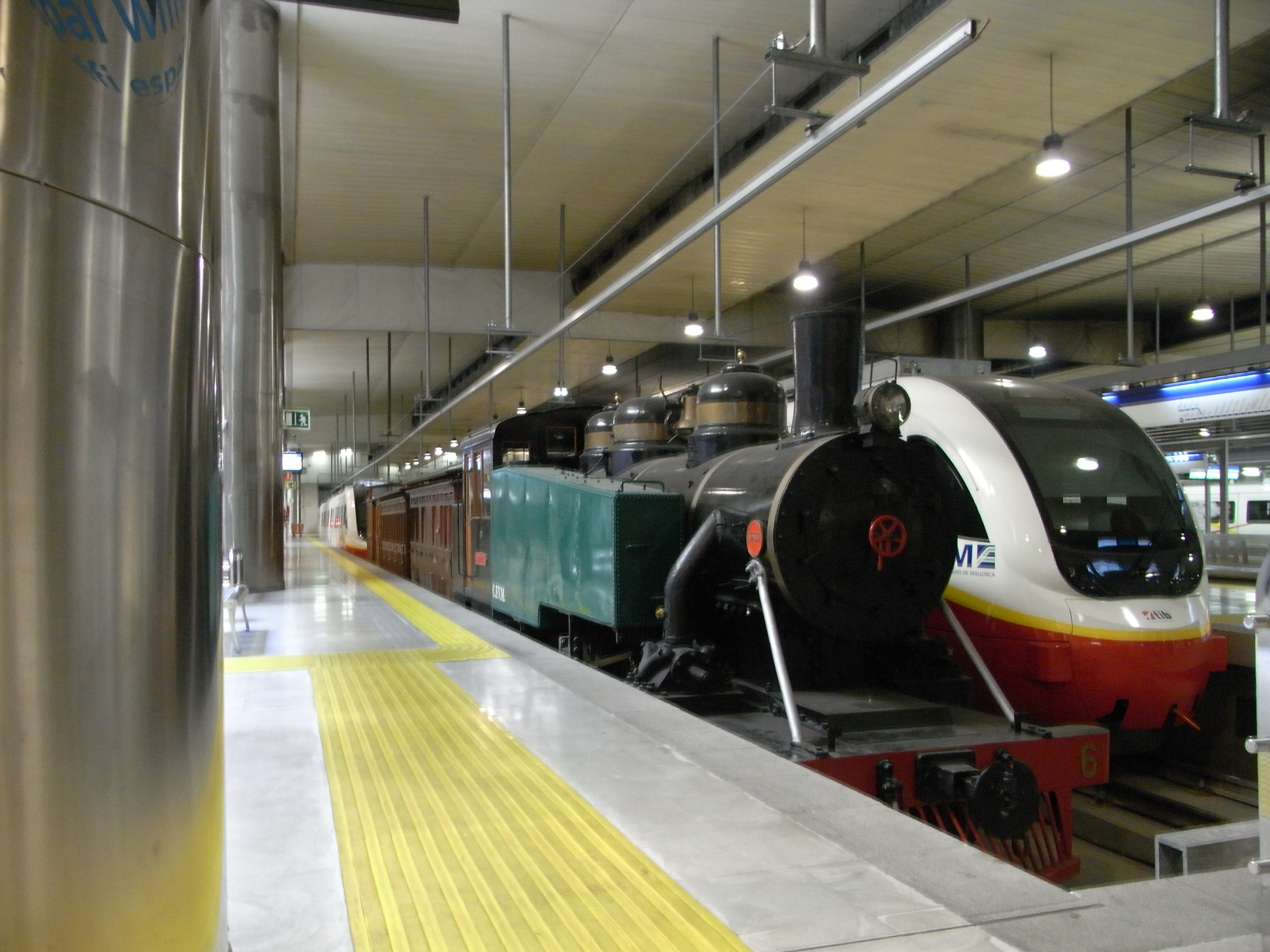
Heritage steam train on platform

== See also ==
- Majorca rail network
- Ferrocarril de Sóller
