= Palma de Mallorca =

City in the Balearic Islands, Spain

Palma
- City and municipality
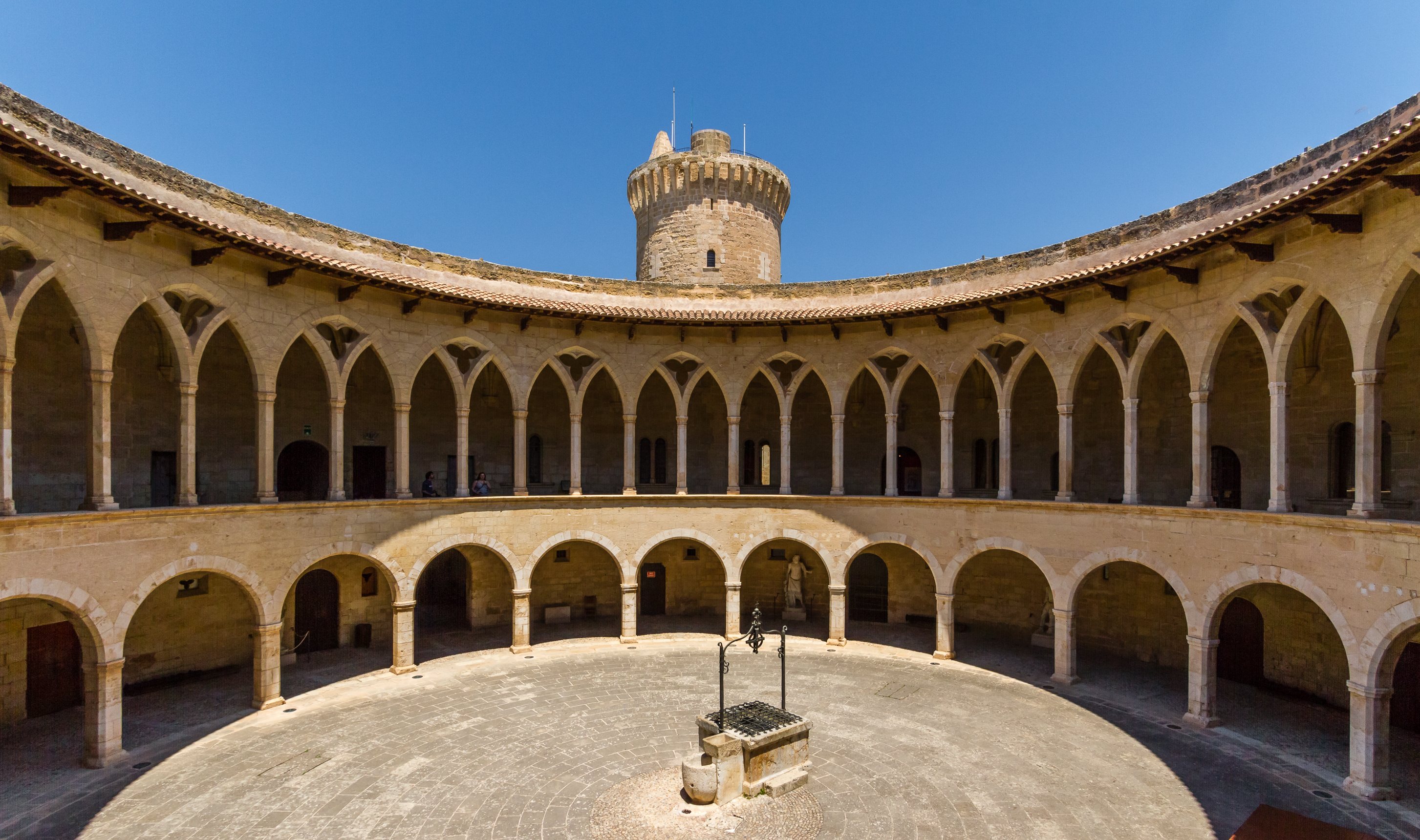
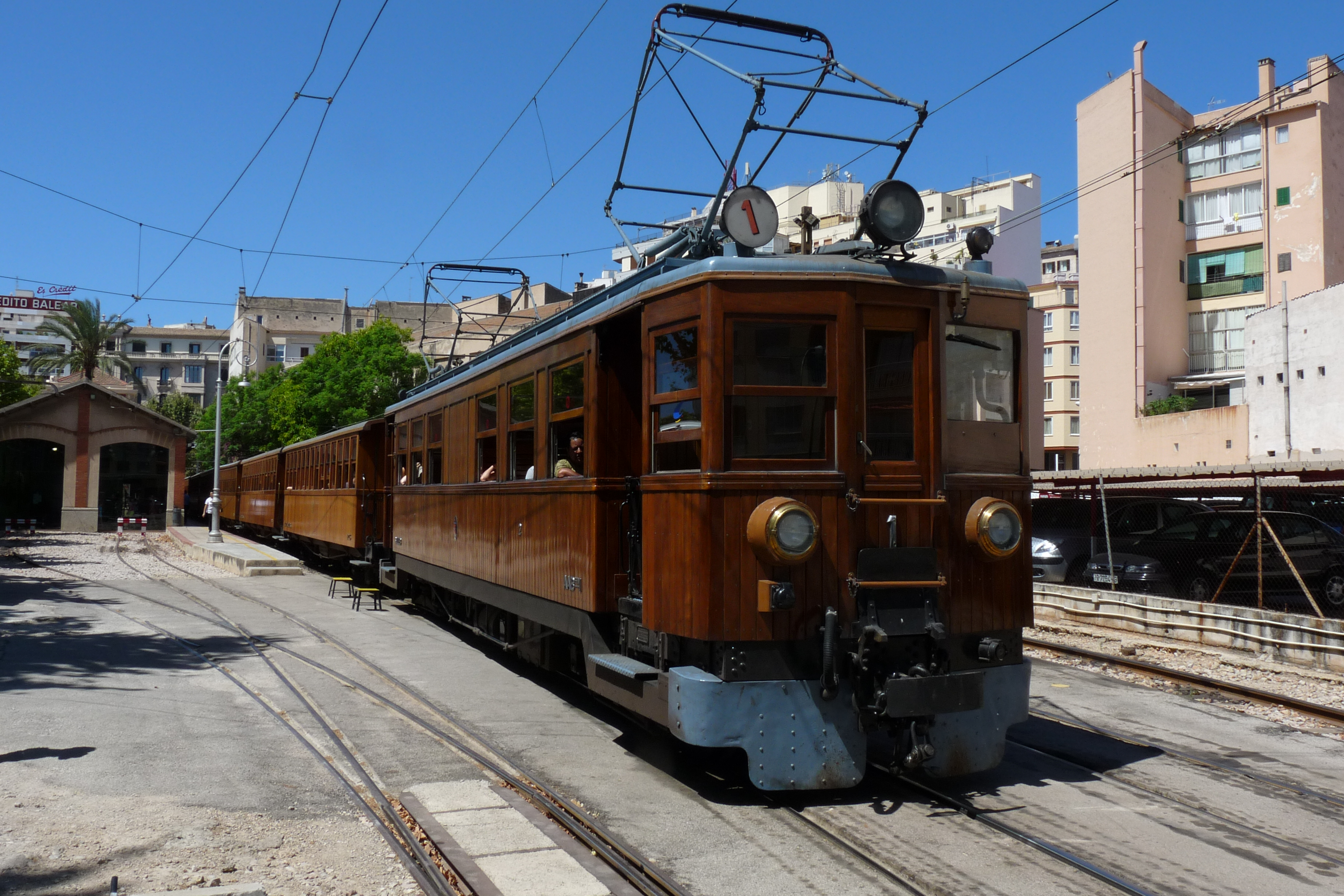
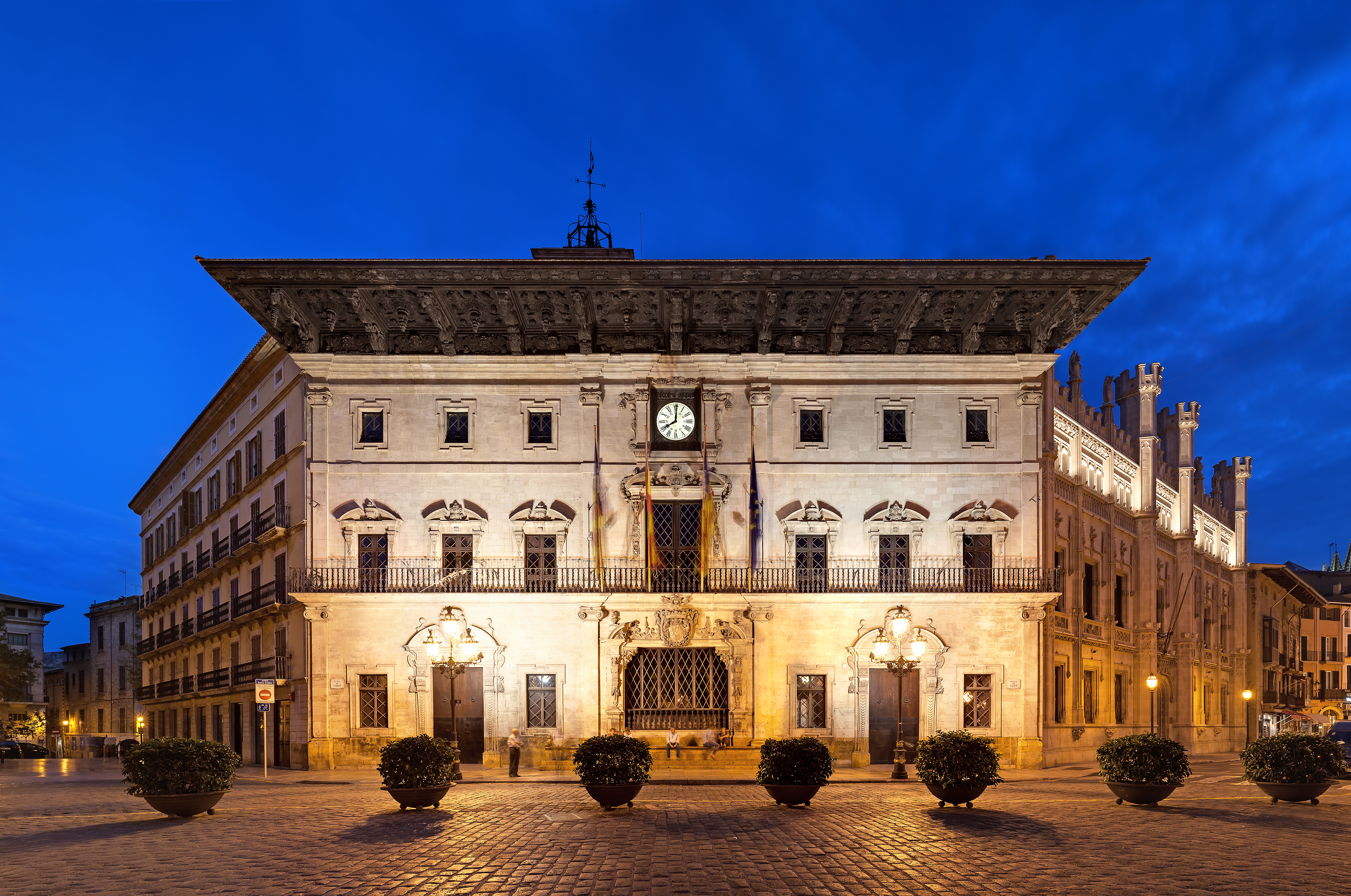
- View from Bellver Castle Cathedral Bellver Castle Railway of Sóller Palma City Hall

- Flag Coat of arms
- Nickname: Ciutat de Mallorca (commonly shortened to Ciutat)
- Location of Palma
- Location within Mallorca Location within Balearic Islands Location within Spain
- Coordinates: 39°34′N 2°39′E
- Country: Spain
- Autonomous community: Balearic Islands
- Province: Balearic Islands
- Island: Mallorca
- Comarca: Palma
- Judicial district: Palma
- Founded: 124 BC
- Administrative HQ: Palma City Hall

Government
  - Type: Municipal corporation
  - Body: Ajuntament de Palma
  - Mayor: Jaime Martínez Llabrés (PP)

Area
  - City and municipality: 208.63 km^{2} (80.55 sq mi)
- Elevation: 13 m (43 ft)

Population (2024)
  - City and municipality: 438,234
  - Rank: 8th in Spain
  - Density: 2,100.5/km^{2} (5,440.4/sq mi)
  - Urban: 550,000
- Demonym(s): palmesà, -ana (Cat.) palmesano, -na (Sp.)

GDP
  - Metro: €21.456 billion (2020)
- Time zone: UTC+1 (Central European Time)
  - Summer (DST): UTC+2 (Central European Summer Time)
- Postal code: 070XX
- Dialing code: 971
- Website: www.palma.es

Palma, (Note: Pronunciation of Palma: Balearic Catalan: [ˈpalmə], also [ˈpawmə] Spanish: [ˈpalma]) also known as Palma de Mallorca, (Note: Officially between 1983–1988, 2006–2008, and 2012–2016) is the capital and largest city of the autonomous community of the Balearic Islands in Spain. It is situated on the south coast of Mallorca on the Bay of Palma. With a population of 438,234 as of 2024, it is the 8th-largest city in Spain.

The Cabrera Archipelago, though widely separated from Palma proper, is part of the municipality.

== History ==
Palma was founded as a Roman camp upon the remains of a Talaiotic settlement. The city was subjected to several Vandal raids during the fall of the Western Roman Empire, then reconquered by the Byzantine Empire, then colonised by the Moors (who called it Medina Mayurqa) and, in the 13th century, by James I of Aragon.

=== Roman period ===
After the conquest of Mallorca, the city was loosely incorporated into the province of Tarraconensis by 123 BC; the Romans founded two new cities: Palma on the south of the island, and Pollentia in the northeast – on the site of a Phoenician settlement. Whilst Pollentia acted as a port to Roman cities on the northwestern Mediterranean Sea, Palma was the port used for destinations in Africa, such as Carthage, and Hispania, such as Saguntum, Gades and Carthago Nova. Though present-day Palma has no significant remains from this period, occasional archaeological finds are made in city centre excavations. For example, the remains of the Roman Wall can be seen at Can Bordils, the Municipal Archive, and below it, at the Maimó ben Faraig Center.

=== Byzantine period ===
Though the period between the fall of the Western Roman Empire and the Muslim conquest is not well understood (due to lack of documents), there is clear evidence of a Byzantine presence in the city, as indicated by mosaics found in the oldest parts of the cathedral, which was in early medieval times part of a paleo-Christian temple.

=== Muslim period ===
Between 902 and 1229, the city was under Islamic control. It remained the capital of the island and it was known as Medina Mayurqa, which in Arabic means City of Majorca.

==== Under the Emirate of Córdoba ====
The arrival of the Moors in the Balearic Islands occurred at the beginning of the 8th century. During this period, the population developed an economy based on self-sufficiency and piracy and even showed evidence of a relative hierarchy. The dominant groups took advantage of the Byzantine withdrawal due to Islamic expansion across the Mediterranean, to reinforce their domination upon the rest of the population, thus ensuring their power and the gradual abandonment of Imperial political structures.

In 708, a Muslim fleet, under the command of Abd Allah ibn Musa, son of the governor of Ifriqiya, Musa ibn Nusayr, stopped off at the island. It appears that Abd Allah convinced the powers of the city to accept a peace treaty. This treaty was granted in exchange for a tax, respect for the social, economic, and political structures of the communities that subscribed to it, as well as the continuity of their religious beliefs.

After 707, the city was inhabited by Christians who were nominally in allegiance to the sovereignty of the Umayyad Caliphate, yet who, de facto, enjoyed absolute autonomy. The city, being in Mallorca, constituted an enclave between western Christian and Islamic territories, and this attracted and encouraged increased levels of piracy in the surrounding waters. For wide sectors of the city's population, the sacking of ships (whether Muslim or Christian) which passed through Balearic waters was a source of riches over the next fifteen decades. Eventually, continued piracy in the region led to a retaliation by Al-Andalus which launched a naval fleet against the city and the whole of the Islands. The Islands were defended by the emperor Charlemagne in 799 from a Muslim pirate incursion.

In 848 (maybe 849), four years after the first Viking incursions had sacked the whole island, an attack from Córdoba forced the authorities to ratify the treaty to which the city had submitted in 707. As the city still occupied an eccentric position regarding the commerce network established by the Moors in the western Mediterranean, the enclave was not immediately incorporated into Al-Andalus.

While the Emirate of Córdoba reinforced its influence upon the Mediterranean, Al-Andalus increased its interest in the city. The consequence of this was the substitution of the submission treaty for the effective incorporation of the islands to the Islamic state. A squad under the command of Isam al-Jawlani took advantage of the instability caused by several Viking incursions and disembarked in Mallorca, and after destroying any resistance, incorporated Mallorca, with Palma as its capital, to the Córdoban state.

The incorporation of the city into the Emirate set the basis for a new society. Commerce and manufacturing developed in a previously unknown manner. This caused considerable demographic growth, thereby establishing Medina Mayurqa as one of the major ports for trading goods in and out of the Emirate of Córdoba.

==== Dénia—Balearic taifa (1015–1087) ====
The Umayyad regime, despite its administrative centralisation, mercenary army and struggle to gain wider social support, could neither harmonise the various ethnic groups inside al-Andalus nor dissolve the old tribes which still organised sporadic ethnic fighting. During the 11th century, the Caliphate's control waned considerably. Provinces broke free from the central Cordoban administration and became effectively sovereign states — taifas — under the same governors that had been named by the last Umayyad Caliphs. According to their origin, these "taifas" can be grouped under three broad categories: people of Arab, Berber or Slavic origin.

Palma was part of the taifa of Dénia. The founder of this state was a client of the Al-Mansur family, Muyahid ibn Yusuf ibn Ali, who could profit from the progressive crumbling of the Caliphate's superstructure to gain control over the province of Dénia. Subsequently, Muyahid organised a campaign throughout the Balearic Islands to consolidate the district and incorporated it into their "taifa" in early 1015.

During the following years, Palma became the main port from where attacks on Christian vessels and coasts could be launched. Palma was the base from where a campaign against Sardinia was launched between 1016 and 1017, which caused the Pisans and Genoese forces to intervene. Later, this intervention set the basis for Italian mercantile penetration of the city.

The Denian dominion lasted until 1087, a period during which the city and the rest of the islands were relatively peaceful. Their supremacy at sea was still not rivaled by the Italian merchant republics, thus there were few external threats.

==== Balearic Taifa (1087–1115) and Western Mediterranean ====
The Banu Hud conquest of Dénia and its incorporation to the Eastern District of the taifa of Zaragoza meant the destruction of the legacy of Muyahid. The islands were freed from mainland dominion and briefly enjoyed independence, during which Medina Mayurqa was the capital.

The economy during this period depended on both agriculture and piracy. In the latter 11th century, Christian commercial powers took the initiative at sea against the Muslims. After centuries of fighting defensively in the face of Islamic pressure, Italians, Catalans and Occitans took offensive action. Consequently, the benefits of piracy diminished causing severe economic stress to the city.

The clearest proof of the new ruling relation of forces, from 1090, is the Crusade organised by the most important mercantile cities of the Christian states against the Islands. This effort was destined to finally eradicate Muslim piracy mainly based in Palma and surrounding havens. In 1115, Palma was sacked and later abandoned by an expedition commanded by Ramon Berenguer III the Great, count of Barcelona and Provence, which was composed of Catalans, Pisans, and other Italians, and soldiers from Provence, Corsica, and Sardinia, in a struggle to end Almoravid control.

After this, the Islands became part of the Almoravid dynasty. The inglobement of all the taifa to a larger state helped to re-establish a balance along the frontier that separated western Christian states from the Muslim world.

==== Period of the Banu Ganiya (1157–1203) ====
The situation changed in the mid-12th century when the Almoravids were displaced from al-Andalus and western Maghreb by the Almohad. Almoravid dominions, from 1157 on, were restricted to the Balearic Islands, with Palma again acting as the capital, governed by Muhammad ibn Ganiya. The massive arrival of al-Andalus refugees contributed to reinforcing the positions of the last Almoravid legitimatists, the Banu Ganiya, who, conscious of their weakness in the Western Mediterranean context, started to get closer to the growing powers represented by Italian maritime republics. Genoa and Pisans obtained in this period their first commercial concessions in the city and the rest of the islands.

The Banu Ganiya, taking advantage of the great loss suffered by Abu Yuqub Yusuf in the Siege of Santarém, attacked Ifriqiya, where the Almohad dominion had not been consolidated yet, in the same year. However, this attack was repelled and the Almohad authorities encouraged anti-Almoravid revolts in the Islands. The city was captured by the Almohads in 1203.

=== Aragonese conquest and late Middle Ages ===
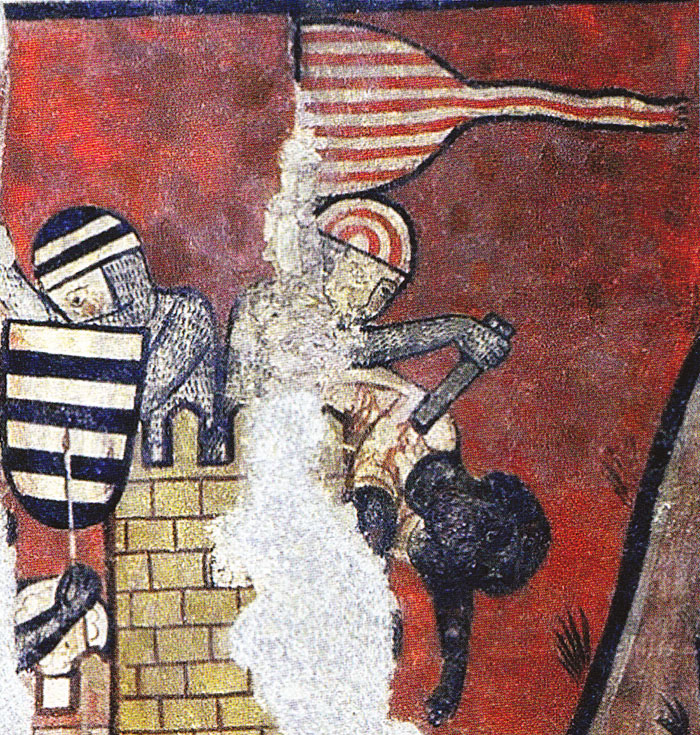
Conquest of Madina Mayurqa

On 31 December 1229, after three months of siege, the city was conquered by James I of Aragon and was renamed Ciutat de Mallorca (Mallorca City). In addition to being kept as the capital of the Kingdom of Majorca, it was given a municipality that comprised the whole island. The governing arm was the University of the City and Kingdom of Majorca.

After the death of James I of Aragon, Palma became the joint capital of the Kingdom of Majorca, together with Perpignan. His son, James II of Majorca, championed the construction of statues and monuments in the city: Bellver Castle, the churches of St. Francesc and St. Domingo, reformed the Palace of Almudaina and began the construction of the Cathedral of Majorca.

The city's advantageous geographical location allowed it extensive commerce with Catalonia, Valencia, Provence, the Maghreb, the Italian republics, and the dominions of the Ottoman Empire, which heralded a golden age for the city, ending with Aragonese conquest in 1344. In 1391, anti-Jewish riots broke out. The Jewish community of Inca was completely wiped out, as were those of Sóller, Sineu, and Alcudia. Despite the governor's prohibition on leaving the island, many Jews fled to North Africa. The remaining Jews were forced to convert under the threat of death.

Abraham Cresques was a 14th-century Jewish cartographer of the Majorcan cartographic school from Palma; Cresques is credited with the authorship of the famous Catalan Atlas.

The river that cut through the city gave rise to two distinct areas within the city; the "Upper town" and "Lower town", depending upon which side of the river one was situated.

At the beginning of the 16th century, the Rebellion of the Brotherhoods (a peasant uprising against Charles V's administration) and the frequent attack of Turkish and Berber pirates caused a reduction of commercial activities and a huge investment in defensive structures. As a consequence, the city entered a period of decadence that would last till the end of the 17th century. Catalina Tomas, a canoness and mystic who became later one of the patron saints of Mallorca, lived in the convent of St Mary Magdalene of Palma between 1550 and 1572.

=== 17th to 19th centuries ===
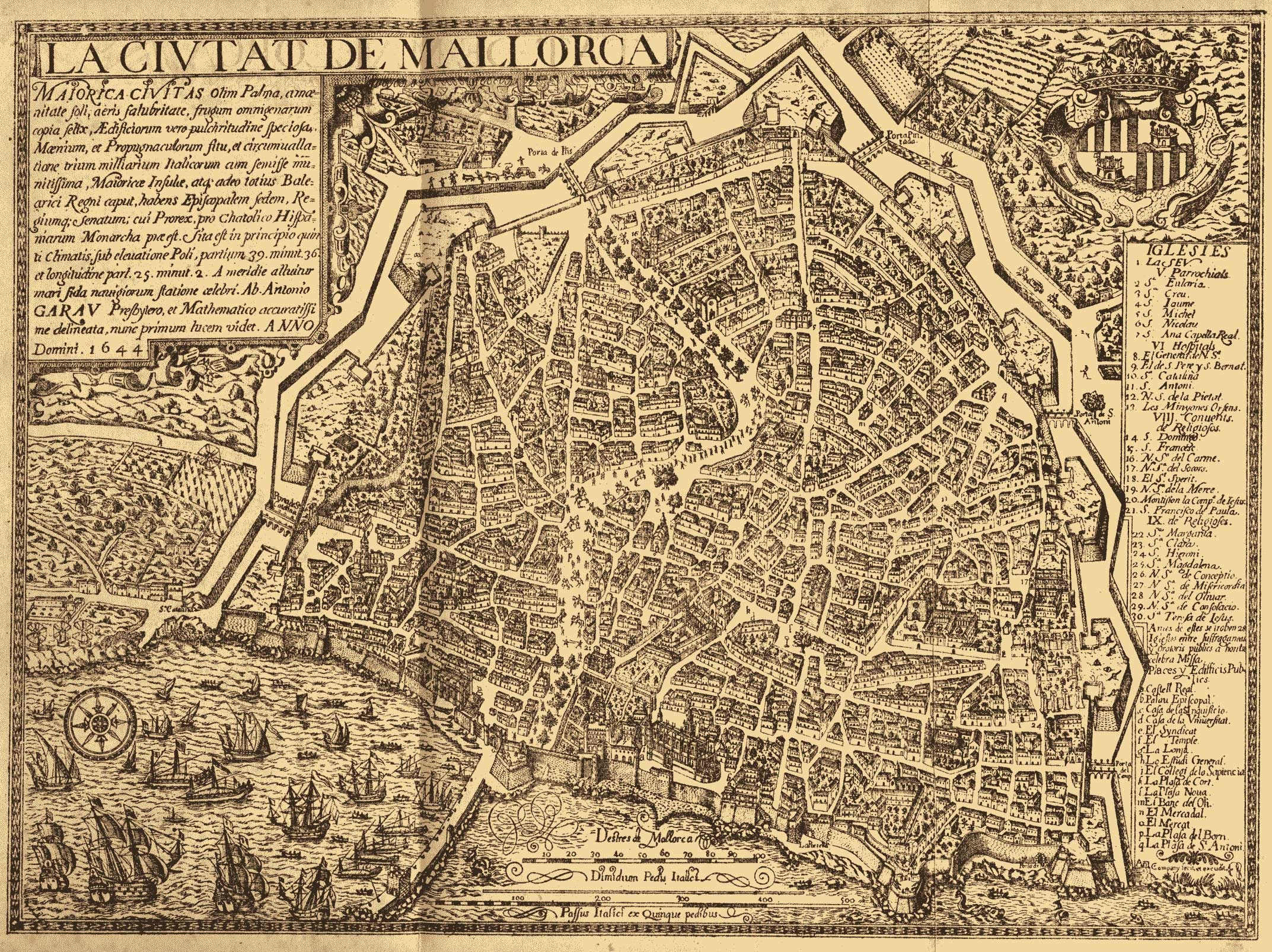
17th-century map of Mallorca by Antoni Guerau

The 17th century was characterised by the division of the city into two sides or gangs, named Canamunts and Canavalls (from Majorcan Catalan "the ones from the upper/lower side"), with severe social and economic repercussions. During this period, the port became a haven for pirates. During the last quarter of the century, the Inquisition continued its persecution of the city's Jews, locally called xuetes. Xuetes practiced strict endogamy by marrying only within their own group. Many of their descendants observe a syncretist form of Christian worship known as Xueta Christianity.

The fall of Barcelona in 1714 meant the end of the War of the Spanish Succession and the defeat and destruction of the Crown of Aragon, and this was reflected in the Nueva Planta decrees, issued by Philip V of Spain in 1715. These occupation decrees changed the government of the island and separated it from the municipality's government of Palma, which became the official city name. By the end of the 19th century, the name Palma de Mallorca was generalised in written Spanish, although it is still colloquially named Ciutat (city) in Catalan. In the 18th century, Charles III of Spain removed interdiction of commerce with Spanish colonies in America and the port and commercial activity of the city grew once again. At the beginning of the 19th century, Palma became a refuge for many who had exiled themselves from the Napoleonic occupation of Catalonia and Valencia; during this period freedom flourished, until the absolutist restoration. With the establishment of the contemporary Spanish state administrative organization, Palma became the capital of the new Balearic Islands province in the 1833 territorial division of Spain. The French occupation of Algeria in the 19th century ended the fear of Maghrebi attacks in Majorca, which favoured the expansion of new maritime routes, and consequently, the economic growth of the city.

=== Modern period ===
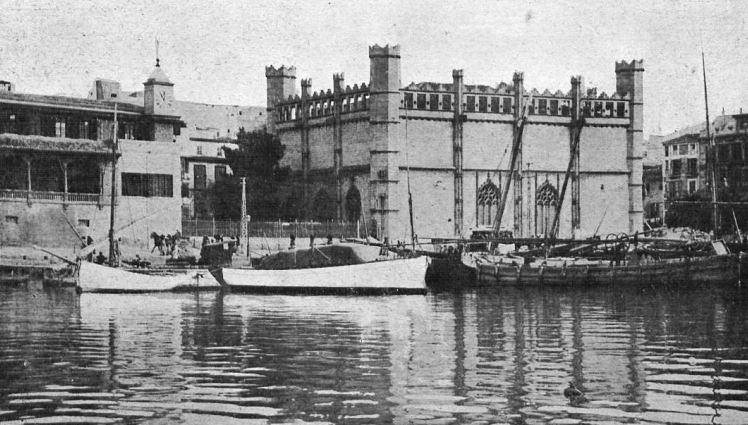
The Llotja circa 1910

Since the advent of mass tourism in the 1950s, the city has been transformed into a tourist destination and has attracted many workers from mainland Spain. This has contributed to a huge change in the city's traditions, its language, and its economic power.

The boom in tourism has caused Palma to grow significantly. In 1960, Mallorca received 500,000 visitors, in 1997 it received more than 6,739,700. In 2001 more than 19,200,000 people passed through Son Sant Joan airport near Palma, with an additional 1.5 million coming by sea. In 2023, the total number of passengers arriving at Son Sant Joan airport amounted to 31,105,987.

In the 21st century, urban redevelopment, by the so-called Pla Mirall (English "Mirror Plan"), had attracted groups of immigrant workers from outside the European Union, especially from Africa and South America.

Tourism provides 80% of the island's GNP. Tourism has affected the rapid economic growth of Palma, placing the island of Mallorca among the wealthier regions in Spain.

The second economic portal of Palma is agriculture. The main exports of Palma's agriculture are almonds, oranges, lemons, and olives. The island is also gifted with a wide variety of natural resources, such as mines of copper, lead, and marble.

The city also has several surrounding neighborhood communities including Establiments, Nord, Son Espanyol, Ces Cases Noves, and Sa Creu Vermella.

In 1953, the Riu family—Juan Riu and María Bertrán Espigulé, together with their son Luis Riu Bertrán —acquired the small Hotel San Francisco at Playa de Palma, a property that later became emblematic of the island's beach tourism. During a 1954 trip to Germany, Luis Riu reached a booking arrangement with tour operator Dr. Tigges (a forerunner of today's TUI), which began sending organised groups of German holidaymakers to the hotel and helped to pioneer early package travel to Mallorca. At the time, flights for these early packages used Palma's Son Bonet airfield, which served as the island's main civil airport until traffic moved to Son Sant Joan in 1959. In the early 1960s, German charter carriers—among them LTU, founded in 1955—expanded seasonal services from Düsseldorf and other cities to Mallorca, contributing to the consolidation of mass tourism in the Balearic Islands.

In October 2021, Palma was shortlisted for the European Commission's 2022 European Capital of Smart Tourism award along with Bordeaux, Copenhagen, Dublin, Florence, Ljubljana and Valencia.

== Geography ==
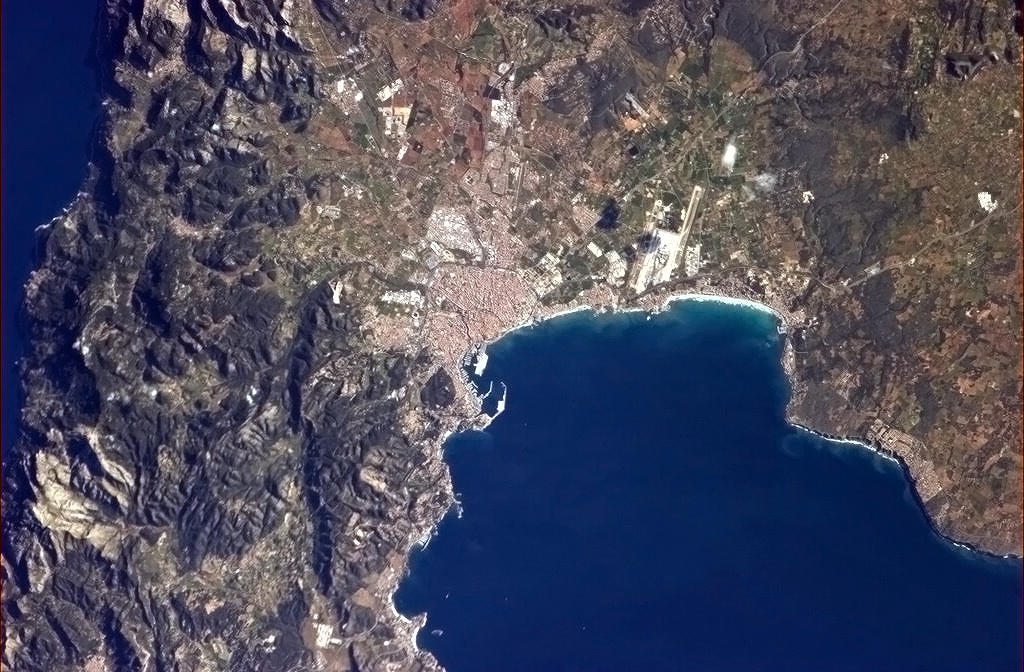
Palma pictured from the International Space Station

Palma is a major city and seaport located in the southwest of Mallorca, a western Mediterranean island belonging to the Balearic Islands archipelago. The land area of the city is about 21.355 square kilometres (8.245 sq mi) with an altitude of 13 metres (43 feet) above sea level.

The city center of Palma is located north of the homonymous bay (Badia de Palma in the local Catalan language). The area that extends eastwards is mostly a flat fertile plain known as Es Pla. To the north and west, the city borders the Serra de Tramuntana, the island's major mountain range, and a Unesco World Heritage site.

=== Climate ===
Palma has a hot semi-arid climate bordering on a hot-summer Mediterranean climate (Köppen: BSh bordering on Csa; Trewartha: BSal bordering on Csal) with an average annual temperature of 18.5 °C (65 °F). During the coldest month, January, the average high temperature is 15.7 °C (60 °F), while the average low is 8.5 °C (47 °F). In the warmest month, August, the average high temperature is 30.2 °C (86 °F), while the low is 23.0 °C (73 °F). Autumn is the wettest season, with occasional heavy rainfall and storms. The average sunshine hours are around 2800 per year. There is a significant maritime influence, so the city has mild winters and hot but not extreme summers. The surrounding continental landmasses can warm up the offshore sea surface temperatures and as a result, the small confines of Mallorca are still able to build up and sustain heat despite being on an island. There is vast seasonal lag, especially in late summer courtesy of the seawater peaking in temperatures long after the summer solstice. Extreme temperatures are rare for the influence of the sea. Freezes are extremely rare, as the port of Mallorca has only registered once a low temperature below freezing (−0.1 °C (32 °F) in February 2012), as well as Mallorca, has never gone above 40 °C (104 °F) in any summer month since temperature records began in 1978. The average temperature of the sea in Mallorca is 19.5 °C (67 °F) and the beach weather normally lasts about 6–7 months, from late April to early November.

Climate data for Palma de Mallorca (Puerto de Palma) WMO ID: 08301; Climate ID: B228; coordinates 39°33′19″N 02°37′31″W; elevation: 3 m (9.8 ft); 1991–2020 provisional normals, (Note: Mean monthly maxima and minima (i.e. the highest and lowest temperature readings during an entire month or year) calculated based on data at said location from 1991 to 2020.) extremes 1978–present
| Month | Jan | Feb | Mar | Apr | May | Jun | Jul | Aug | Sep | Oct | Nov | Dec | Year |
|---|---|---|---|---|---|---|---|---|---|---|---|---|---|
| Record high °C (°F) | 24.2 (75.6) | 24.4 (75.9) | 27.3 (81.1) | 28.9 (84.0) | 32.0 (89.6) | 36.5 (97.7) | 38.0 (100.4) | 39.1 (102.4) | 35.5 (95.9) | 31.2 (88.2) | 27.6 (81.7) | 26.0 (78.8) | 39.1 (102.4) |
| Mean maximum °C (°F) | 19.7 (67.5) | 20.2 (68.4) | 22.6 (72.7) | 24.7 (76.5) | 28.1 (82.6) | 32.5 (90.5) | 34.3 (93.7) | 34.3 (93.7) | 31.4 (88.5) | 28.1 (82.6) | 23.9 (75.0) | 21.0 (69.8) | 35.4 (95.7) |
| Mean daily maximum °C (°F) | 15.7 (60.3) | 15.7 (60.3) | 17.6 (63.7) | 19.7 (67.5) | 23.0 (73.4) | 27.0 (80.6) | 29.7 (85.5) | 30.2 (86.4) | 27.4 (81.3) | 24.0 (75.2) | 19.5 (67.1) | 16.8 (62.2) | 22.2 (72.0) |
| Daily mean °C (°F) | 12.1 (53.8) | 12.0 (53.6) | 13.8 (56.8) | 16.0 (60.8) | 19.2 (66.6) | 23.2 (73.8) | 26.0 (78.8) | 26.6 (79.9) | 23.8 (74.8) | 20.4 (68.7) | 16.0 (60.8) | 13.4 (56.1) | 18.5 (65.3) |
| Mean daily minimum °C (°F) | 8.5 (47.3) | 8.4 (47.1) | 9.9 (49.8) | 12.2 (54.0) | 15.5 (59.9) | 19.4 (66.9) | 22.4 (72.3) | 23.0 (73.4) | 20.1 (68.2) | 16.8 (62.2) | 12.4 (54.3) | 9.9 (49.8) | 14.9 (58.8) |
| Mean minimum °C (°F) | 4.5 (40.1) | 4.4 (39.9) | 6.2 (43.2) | 8.1 (46.6) | 11.7 (53.1) | 15.5 (59.9) | 19.2 (66.6) | 19.7 (67.5) | 15.9 (60.6) | 12.3 (54.1) | 7.9 (46.2) | 5.4 (41.7) | 3.3 (37.9) |
| Record low °C (°F) | 0.0 (32.0) | −0.1 (31.8) | 1.6 (34.9) | 4.4 (39.9) | 8.0 (46.4) | 11.0 (51.8) | 15.8 (60.4) | 15.8 (60.4) | 10.0 (50.0) | 8.4 (47.1) | 3.8 (38.8) | 2.5 (36.5) | −0.1 (31.8) |
| Average precipitation mm (inches) | 44.4 (1.75) | 36.7 (1.44) | 29.2 (1.15) | 37.5 (1.48) | 31.6 (1.24) | 13.9 (0.55) | 5.1 (0.20) | 21.7 (0.85) | 60.5 (2.38) | 72.6 (2.86) | 67.8 (2.67) | 49.3 (1.94) | 470.1 (18.51) |
| Average precipitation days (≥ 1 mm) | 6.2 | 5.9 | 4.6 | 4.7 | 3.1 | 1.9 | 0.6 | 1.8 | 5.3 | 6.3 | 7.2 | 5.9 | 53.6 |
| Average snowy days | 0.2 | 0.3 | 0 | 0 | 0 | 0 | 0 | 0 | 0 | 0 | 0 | 0 | 0.5 |
| Average relative humidity (%) | 74 | 73 | 71 | 69 | 70 | 68 | 69 | 70 | 72 | 75 | 74 | 75 | 72 |
| Mean monthly sunshine hours | 167 | 172 | 217 | 249 | 298 | 327 | 353 | 319 | 234 | 208 | 162 | 152 | 2,858 |
| Percentage possible sunshine | 55 | 57 | 58 | 62 | 66 | 73 | 78 | 75 | 63 | 60 | 54 | 52 | 63 |
Source: State Meteorological Agency/AEMET OpenData

Climate data for Palma de Mallorca, 1981-2010 normals
| Month | Jan | Feb | Mar | Apr | May | Jun | Jul | Aug | Sep | Oct | Nov | Dec | Year |
|---|---|---|---|---|---|---|---|---|---|---|---|---|---|
| Mean daily maximum °C (°F) | 15.4 (59.7) | 15.5 (59.9) | 17.2 (63.0) | 19.2 (66.6) | 22.5 (72.5) | 26.5 (79.7) | 29.4 (84.9) | 29.8 (85.6) | 27.1 (80.8) | 23.7 (74.7) | 19.3 (66.7) | 16.5 (61.7) | 21.8 (71.2) |
| Daily mean °C (°F) | 11.9 (53.4) | 11.9 (53.4) | 13.4 (56.1) | 15.5 (59.9) | 18.8 (65.8) | 22.7 (72.9) | 25.7 (78.3) | 26.2 (79.2) | 23.5 (74.3) | 20.2 (68.4) | 15.8 (60.4) | 13.1 (55.6) | 18.2 (64.8) |
| Mean daily minimum °C (°F) | 8.3 (46.9) | 8.4 (47.1) | 9.6 (49.3) | 11.7 (53.1) | 15.1 (59.2) | 18.9 (66.0) | 21.9 (71.4) | 22.5 (72.5) | 19.9 (67.8) | 16.6 (61.9) | 12.3 (54.1) | 9.7 (49.5) | 14.6 (58.3) |
| Average precipitation mm (inches) | 42 (1.7) | 37 (1.5) | 28 (1.1) | 39 (1.5) | 36 (1.4) | 11 (0.4) | 6 (0.2) | 22 (0.9) | 52 (2.0) | 69 (2.7) | 59 (2.3) | 48 (1.9) | 449 (17.7) |
| Average precipitation days (≥ 1.0 mm) | 5.8 | 5.6 | 4.5 | 5.1 | 3.6 | 1.7 | 0.7 | 1.9 | 4.7 | 6.7 | 6.4 | 6.5 | 53.1 |
| Average snowy days | 0.3 | 0.1 | 0.0 | 0.0 | 0.0 | 0.0 | 0.0 | 0.0 | 0.0 | 0.0 | 0.0 | 0.0 | 0.4 |
| Average relative humidity (%) | 73 | 72 | 70 | 68 | 69 | 69 | 68 | 70 | 72 | 74 | 74 | 74 | 71 |
| Mean monthly sunshine hours | 167 | 170 | 205 | 237 | 284 | 315 | 346 | 316 | 226 | 205 | 161 | 151 | 2,779 |
Source: Agencia Estatal de Meteorología

Climate data for Palma
| Month | Jan | Feb | Mar | Apr | May | Jun | Jul | Aug | Sep | Oct | Nov | Dec | Year |
|---|---|---|---|---|---|---|---|---|---|---|---|---|---|
| Average sea temperature °C (°F) | 14.4 (57.9) | 13.9 (57.0) | 14.1 (57.4) | 15.9 (60.7) | 18.9 (66.1) | 22.5 (72.5) | 24.9 (76.7) | 26.0 (78.8) | 25.0 (77.1) | 22.7 (72.9) | 19.7 (67.4) | 16.3 (61.4) | 19.5 (67.2) |
| Mean daily daylight hours | 10.0 | 11.0 | 12.0 | 13.0 | 14.0 | 15.0 | 15.0 | 14.0 | 12.0 | 11.0 | 10.0 | 9.0 | 12.2 |
| Average Ultraviolet index | 2 | 3 | 5 | 6 | 8 | 9 | 9 | 8 | 6 | 4 | 2 | 2 | 5.3 |
Source: seatemperature.org
Source: Weather Atlas

== Demographics ==
Historical population
| Year | Pop. | ±% |
|---|---|---|
| 1842 | 42,352 | — |
| 1857 | 53,382 | +26.0% |
| 1877 | 60,633 | +13.6% |
| 1887 | 62,534 | +3.1% |
| 1900 | 65,382 | +4.6% |
| 1910 | 69,913 | +6.9% |
| 1920 | 78,363 | +12.1% |
| 1930 | 87,746 | +12.0% |
| 1940 | 117,188 | +33.6% |
| 1950 | 133,397 | +13.8% |
| 1960 | 157,131 | +17.8% |
| 1970 | 217,525 | +38.4% |
| 1981 | 290,372 | +33.5% |
| 1991 | 296,754 | +2.2% |
| 2001 | 333,801 | +12.5% |
| 2011 | 402,044 | +20.4% |
| 2021 | 424,837 | +5.7% |
Source: INE

As of 2024, the population is 438,234, and the population of the urban area is 550,000 as of 2017, making it the 12th-largest urban area of Spain. Almost half of the total population of Mallorca lives in Palma.

Foreign population by country of birth (2024)
| Nationality | Population |
|---|---|
| Colombia | 17,767 |
| Argentina | 14,764 |
| Ecuador | 7,731 |
| Morocco | 6,900 |
| Bolivia | 5,199 |
| Germany | 4,543 |
| Venezuela | 3,990 |
| Italy | 3,878 |
| Peru | 3,507 |
| Dominican Republic | 3,256 |
| Bulgaria | 3,253 |
| Cuba | 3,204 |
| China | 3,193 |
| Romania | 3,143 |
| United Kingdom | 2,732 |

As of 2024, the foreign-born population of the city is 128,005, equal to 29.2% of the total population.

== Main sights ==
Video of main sights

=== Plaça d'Espanya ===
The Plaça d'Espanya is the transport hub of Palma. The Estació Intermodal caters to buses and trains (the latter controlled by TIB). The two old buildings are home to the tourist information centre and several cafés sit on either side of the two large escalators which lead into the Estació, which sits underneath a large and popular park. On the lawns are several glass boxes, which let in light and ventilation to the station below ground. There are also train-themed playing structures, each one shaped like a train carriage and named after towns along the line of the Ferrocarril de Sóller, a railway dating back to 1911 which has its Palma Station right next to the park. Just down the street from here a new bus station is under construction. At the centre of the plaza is a statue of James I, Conquistador of Majorca.

=== Cathedral area ===
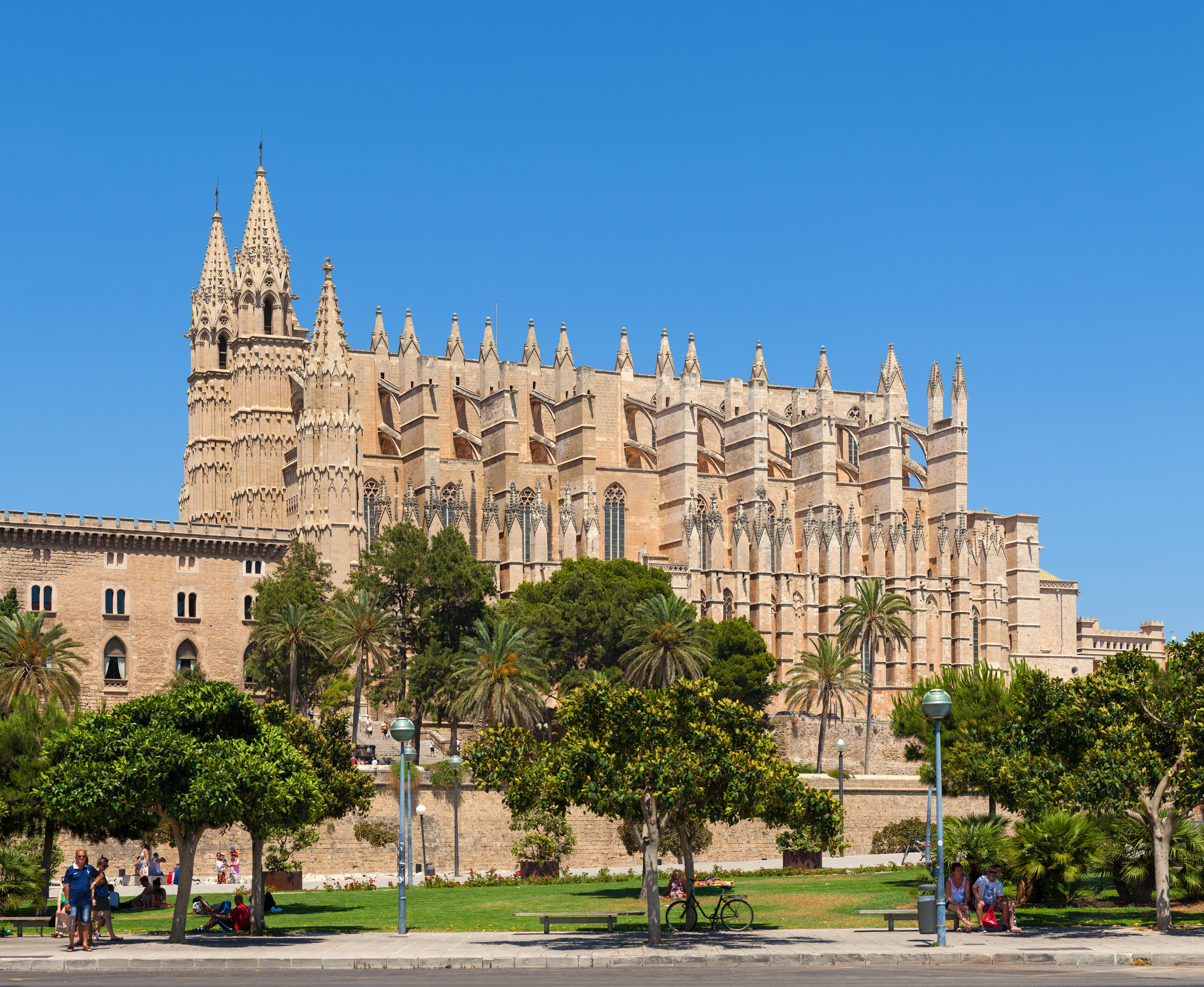
La Seu, Palma Cathedral, built between 1229 and 1346

Palma is famous for La Seu, its vast cathedral built on a previous mosque which was built atop an original Christian church. Although construction of the present Cathedral began in 1229, it did not finish until 1601. Catalan architect Antoni Gaudí was drafted to restore the building in 1901. The Parc de la Mar (Park of the Sea) lies just south, overlooked by the great building which sits above it on the city's stone foundations. Between the two are the town walls.

=== Old city ===
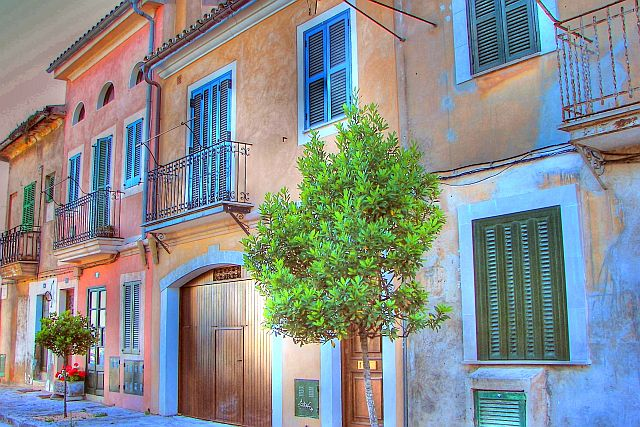
Street in Palma's Old City

The Old City is in the southeast area of Palma behind the cathedral. Except for a few streets and squares which allow traffic and are populated with tourists most of the time, the walkways of this city quarter are fairly narrow. The architecture of the city is comparable to cities such as Florence. The majority are private houses, some of which are open to the public as discreet museums or galleries. The Old City is also home to the Ajuntament (or Town Hall), the Convent of the cathedral, and the Banys Àrabs.

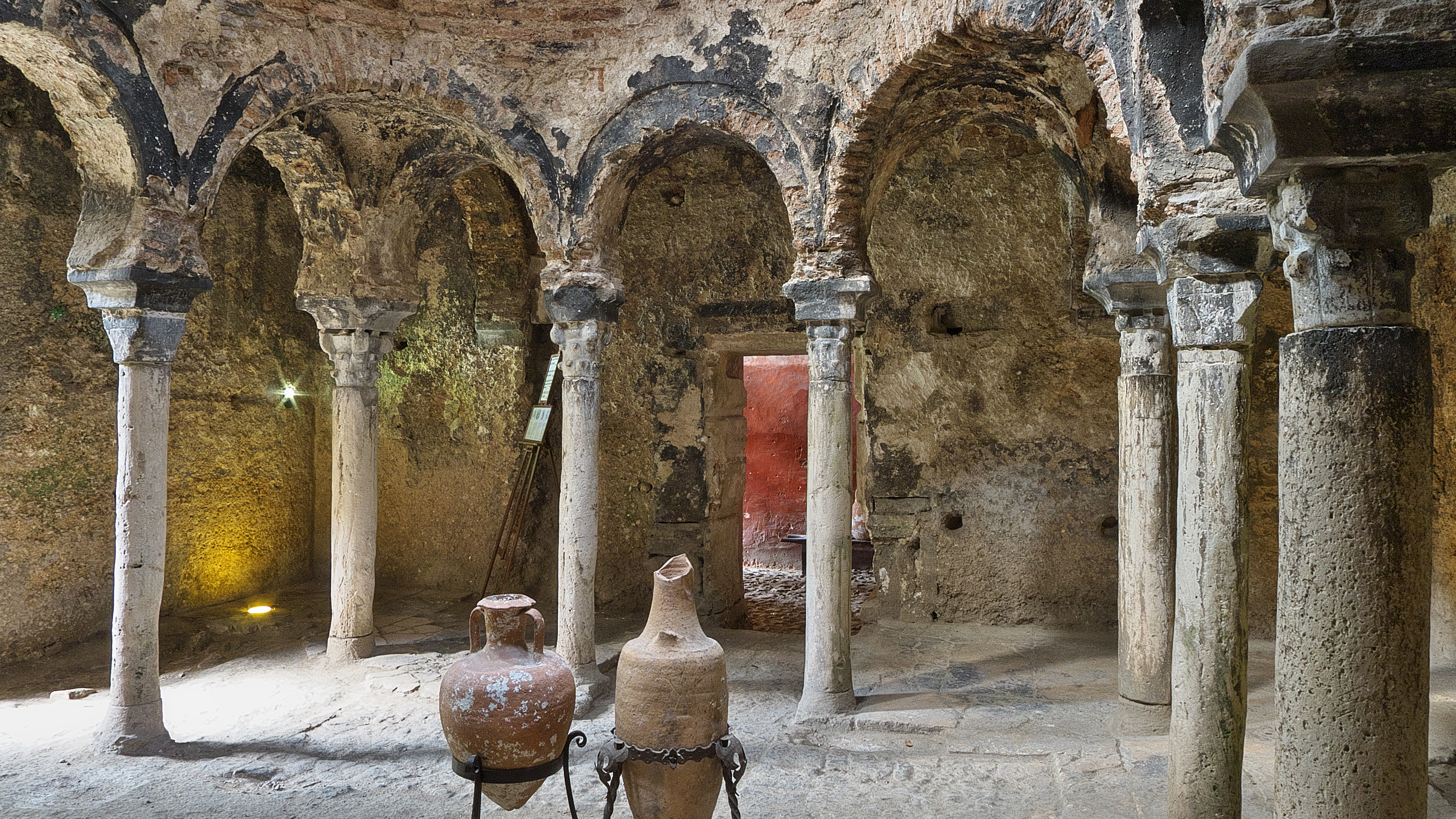
The Banys Àrabs, one of the few remnants of Madina Mayurqa

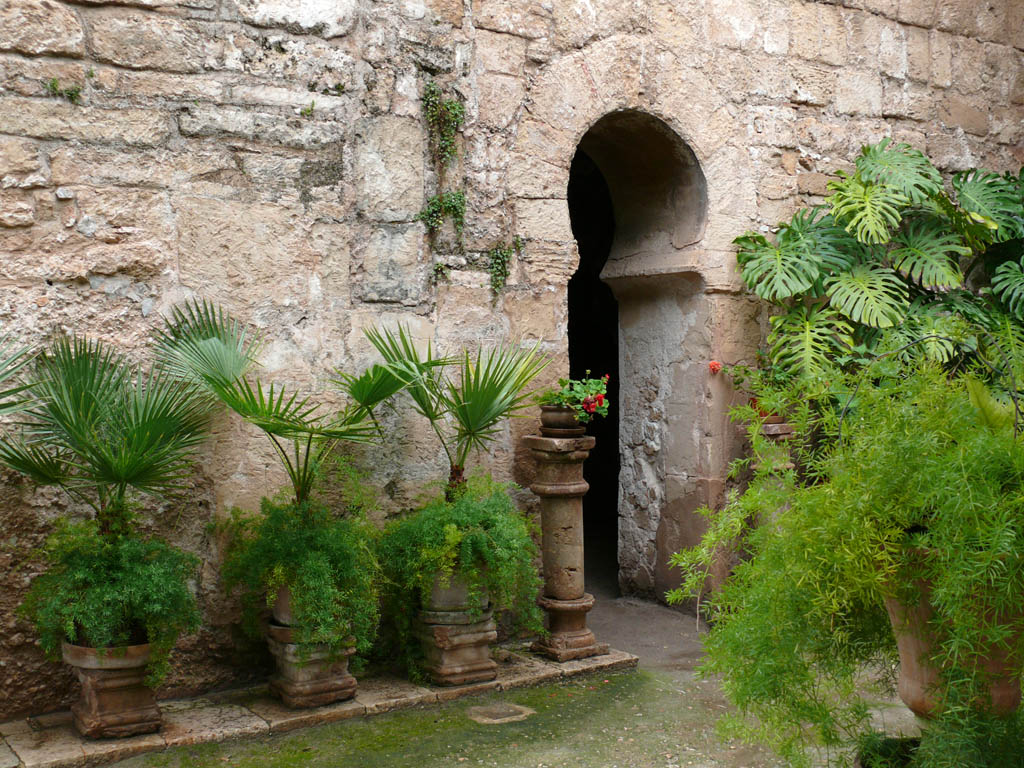
The Banys Àrabs, garden view

==== Banys Àrabs ====
The Banys Àrabs (Arab Baths, in English), one of the few remnants of Palma's Moorish past, are situated on Can Serra street, 7, near the Convent of the cathedral.

The small two-roomed brick building that once housed the baths is of Byzantine origin, dating back to the 11th century and possibly once part of the home of a Muslim nobleman. The bathroom has a cupola with five oculi which let in dazzling light. The twelve columns holding up the small room were pillaged from an earlier Roman construction. The floor over the hypocaust has been worn away by people standing in the centre, mainly to photograph the entrance and the garden beyond it. The whole room is in a rather dilapidated condition. The other room is a brick cube with a small model of the baths as they once were in the corner.

== Notable people ==
Notable people who were born in the city include the following individuals:

- Álex Abrines (born 1993), former basketball player
- Marco Asensio (born 1996), footballer
- Tolo Calafat (1970-2010), mountaineer
- Rossy de Palma (born 1964), actress
- Rudy Fernández (born 1985), former basketball player
- Lorenzo Fluxá (born 2004), racing driver
- Izan Guevara (born 2004), motorcyclist
- Patricia Guijarro (born 1998), footballer for Barcelona and the Spain national team
- Ramon Llull (c. 1232 - c. 1315/16), philosopher and writer
- Jorge Lorenzo (born 1987), motorcyclist and five-time MotoGP champion
- Joan Mir (born 1997), motorcyclist and Moto 3 and MotoGP champion
- Rafael Nadal (born 1986), former tennis player and 22-time Grand Slam champion
- Guillermo Pont (1921-2000), footballer
- Luis Salom (1991-2016), motorcyclist
- Margalida Caimari Vila (1839-1921), poet
- Agustí Villaronga (1953-2023), filmmaker
- Pedro Vives Marcos (born 2001), tennis player

== Sports ==
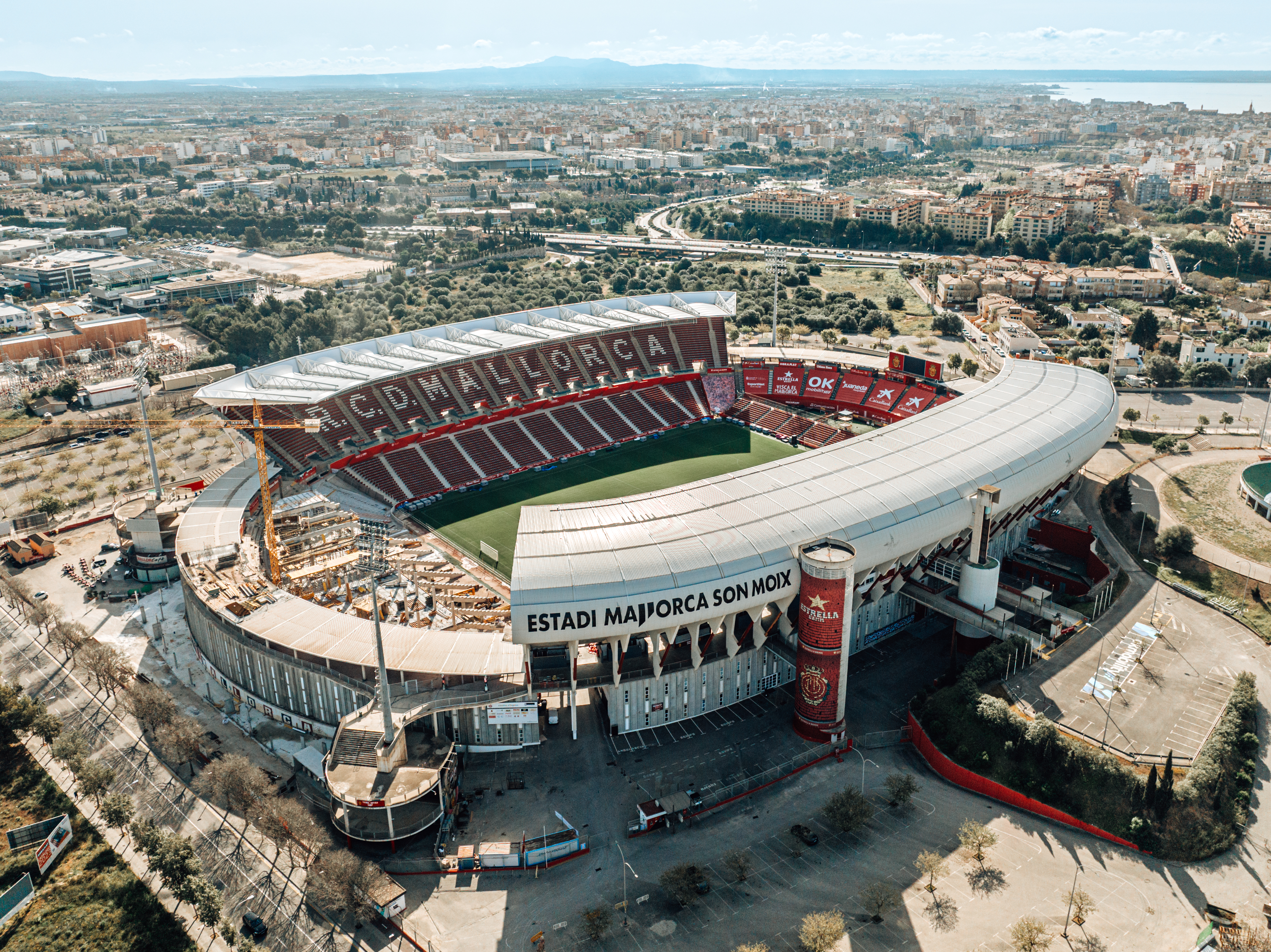
Estadi de Son Moix

Football is the most popular sport on the island, led by the Palma-based Segunda División club Real Mallorca, who play at the Estadi de Son Moix, and Segunda Federación club Atlético Baleares.

Basketball is also a popular sport. Palma's top team is Bahía San Agustín, which plays its home games at the 5,076 capacity Palau Municipal d'Esports Son Moix.

Because of its maritime location, all sea sports have a big presence in Palma.

Road cycling is popular in Mallorca. An international race for professional cyclists, the Vuelta a Mallorca, is held in February, the first day of which consists of a circuit race around the streets of Palma. The city is also home to the Palma Arena, a multi-platinum venue featuring a velodrome. The arena also hosted the Battle of Surfaces tennis event.

In June 2016, the city of Palma participated in the First World Company Sports Games which included five days of culture, sport, and inclusivity within the community of Mallorca as a whole. It was operated through the World Federation Company Sport and was promoted for both local people and tourists to come together in the city. It became a large business venture by offering packages including accommodations close to the events and additional tourism information for future events.

In 2023, Palma hosted the 2023 UEFA Futsal Champions League Finals.

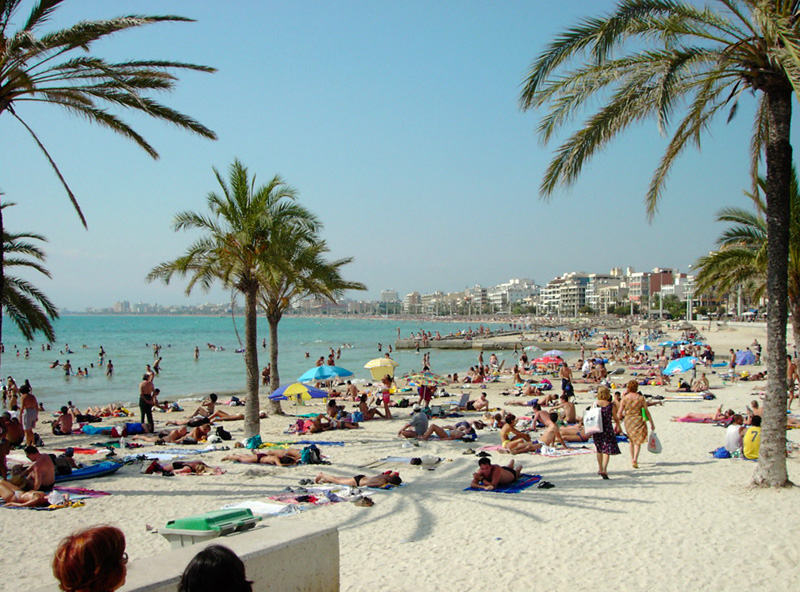
Platja de Palma in El Arenal

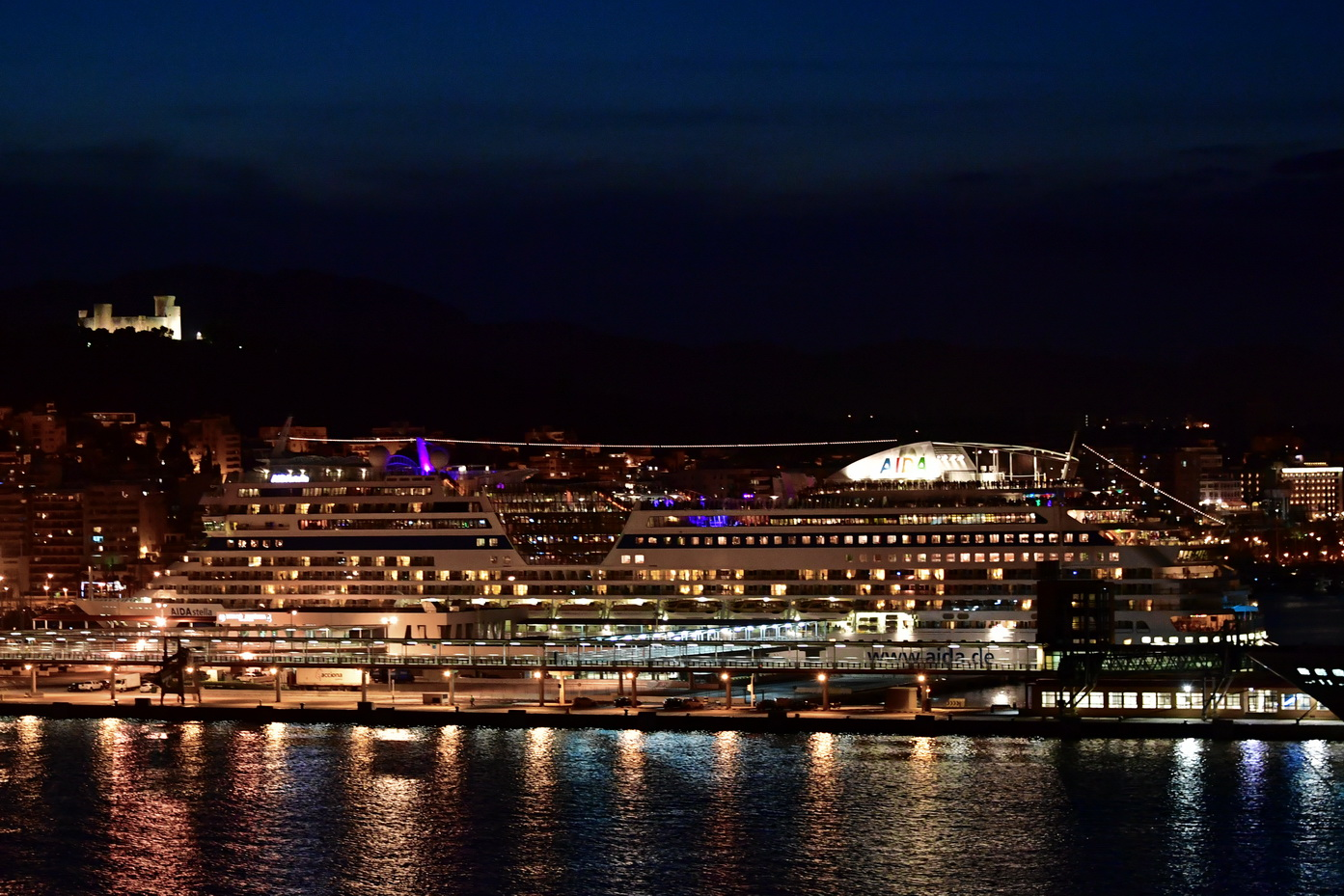
Marina at night

== Transport ==
- Palma de Mallorca Metro
- Mallorca rail network
- The city is served by Palma de Mallorca Airport. It is located 8 km (5.0 mi) east of Palma.
- Port of Palma
- The city bus system, which includes a loop line through the historic centre, is run by the EMT (See external link below).
- There is also a bus system run by the TIB. This includes routes to and from the municipalities Calvià and Palma.
- In the City of Palma there is a fleet of 1246 taxis. All are equipped with air conditioning and most of them have a radiotelephone station, with four existing companies: Taxis Palma Radio, Radio-Taxi Ciutat, Taxi Teléfono and Taxis adapted for users with reduced mobility. Until the change of colour regulated through the Municipal Decree No. 19985 of 15 October 1999, the taxis of Palma for 50 years had been of the characteristic black and ivory colours. Currently, they are white.

== Twin towns – sister cities ==
Palma de Mallorca is twinned with Alghero, Italy and Naples, Italy. Since 2026, it has also been twinned with Santa Cruz de Tenerife, Spain.

== See also ==
- Cort Library
- Duchess of Palma de Mallorca
- Edwin Lewis Snyder, "Spain's Magic Island", The Architect and Engineer, 110:10, 37–45, August 1932
- List of municipalities in Balearic Islands
