= Tranvía de Sóller =

Spanish heritage tramway in the island of Majorca

Coordinates: 39.7772°N 2.7053°E

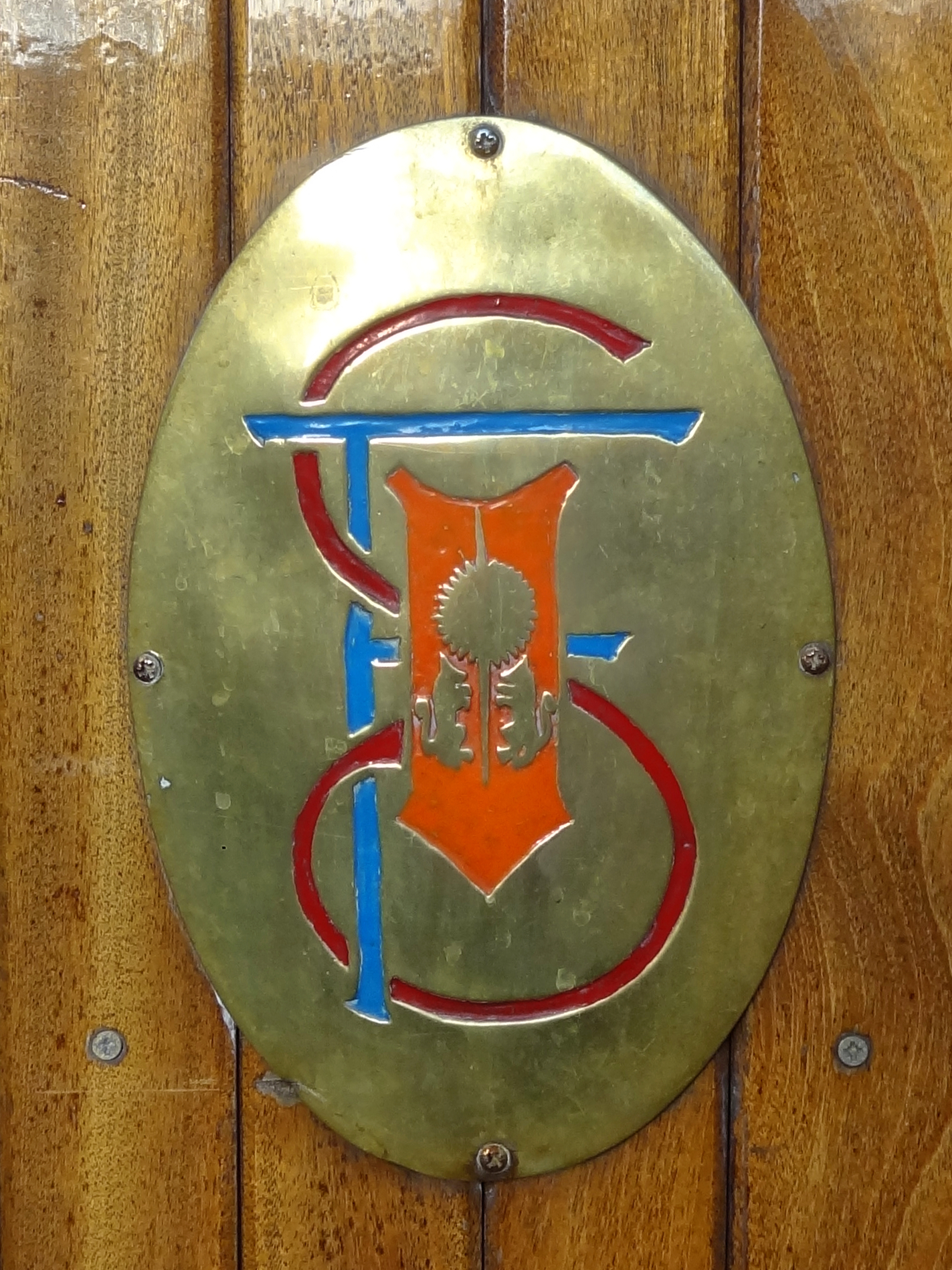

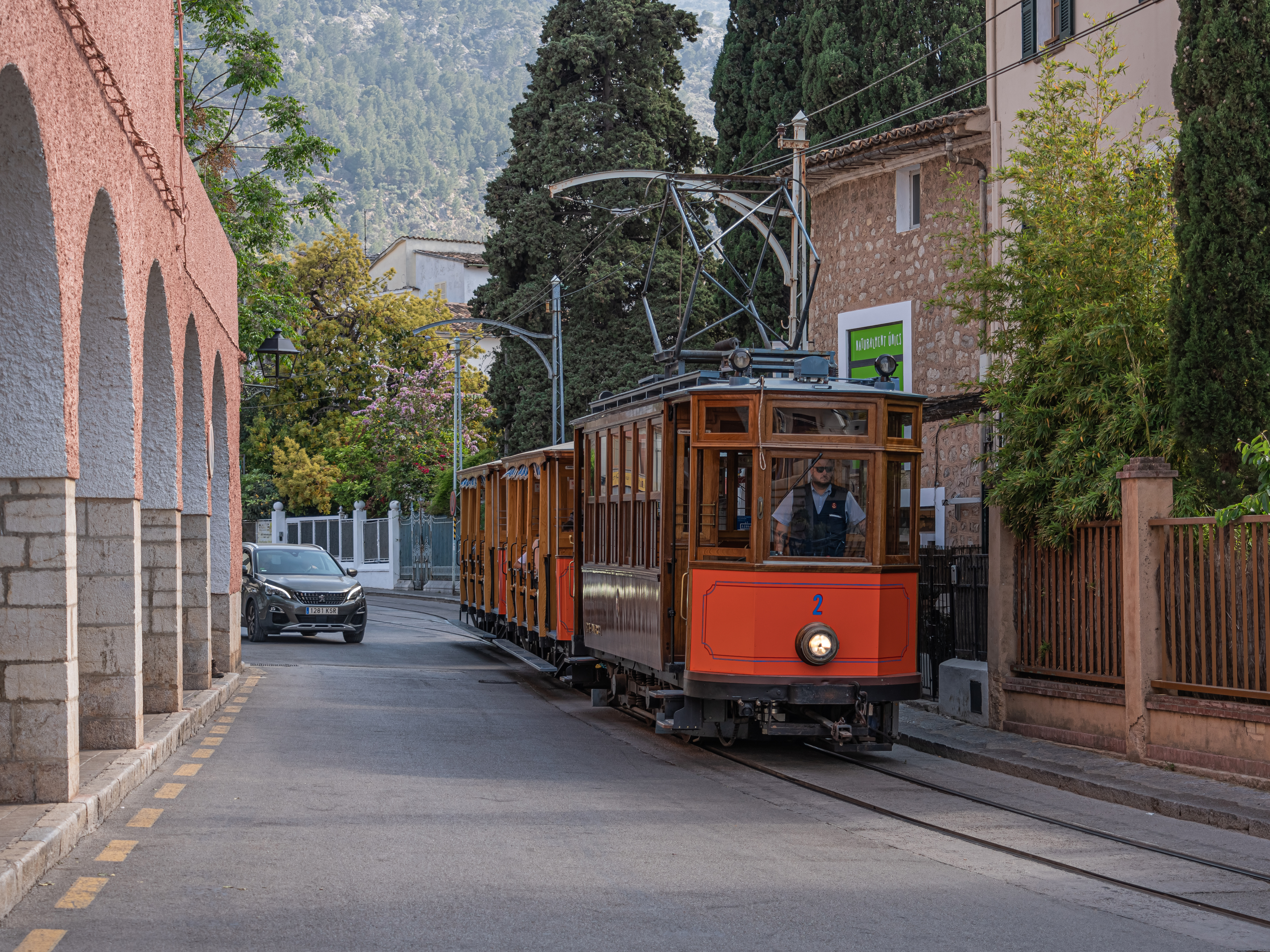
- Tramcar 2 passing through the centre of Sóller

Overview
- Owner: Ferrocarril de Sóller S.A.
- Locale: Sóller (Spain)
- Termini: Sóller; Port de Sóller
- Stations: 17

Service
- Type: Tramway
- Rolling stock: 12 trams

History
- Opened: 4 October 1913

Technical
- Line length: 4.868 km (3.025 mi)
- Number of tracks: Single track
- Track gauge: 914 mm (3 ft)
- Electrification: 600 V DCoverhead lines
- Operating speed: 25 km/h (16 mph)
Route map
- OpenStreetMap map of Sóller Tramway (not all stations shown)

The Tranvía de Sóller (Catalan: Tramvia de Sóller) is a Spanish heritage tramway serving the town of Sóller and the coastal village of Port de Sóller, in the island of Majorca. It is owned by Ferrocarril de Sóller S.A. (FS), the same company operating the heritage rail line linking the town to the city of Palma.

The Tranvía de Sóller is one of only two first generation tramways to survive in Spain, along with the Tramvia Blau in the city of Barcelona.

== Overview ==
The Soller tramway line, which was designed and constructed by the engineer Pedro Garau, opened on 4 October 1913 shortly after the inauguration of Palma-Sóller rail line, and started regular service on 13 October of that year. Electrified from the start of operation, the line is 4.868 km (3 mi 44 yd) long, has a single track with passing loops and runs on 3 ft (914 mm) narrow gauge tracks. It is a popular tourist attraction, especially since the early 2000s, as it uses attractive heritage rolling stock. In 2010 it carried approximately 900,000 passengers.

Along with other small towns (Note: This refers to a town with a population of less than 20,000 inhabitants.) such as Gmunden (Austria: Gmunden Tramway) or Volchansk (Russia: Volchansk tram system), Sóller is one of the smallest European towns with an urban tramway system.

== Route ==
The line has 17 stations, most of them simple stops consisting of a concrete platform, with no buildings. Trams run at approximately 30 minute intervals from 07:00 to midnight, reduced to one trip per hour from 20:00.

The route starts at Sóller railway station, and the southern passenger terminus is just outside the entrance to that station. Trams start inside the railway yard at the tram depot, which is linked to the main railway. On arrival from Port de Soller, trams enter the yard to shunt locomotives for the return trip, but passengers are not allowed into the depot.

The track passes through the town's centre, close to the church of San Bartolomé and goes through the main square, sharing the public road with motor vehicles. The line then follows its own route, through the northern suburb of Sóller and the village of Horta, crosses the MA-11 road, and then runs parallel to that road. Finally, it enters the town of Port de Sóller at the "Sa Torre" stop, and travels along the pedestrianised seafront to the marina at the north end.

The provision of passing loops enables several vehicles to be in transit between the termini, and in high season relief trams run closely behind the scheduled trams, and both tram sets can be accommodated in a loop.

Station	km	Notes
Sóller	0.00	Station on the line to Palma, tram depot
Mercat (Sóller)	0.30	Town centre, passing loop
Can Guida (Sóller)	0.90	
Can Reus (Sóller)	1.20	
L'Horta (Sóller)	1.60	
Monument (Sóller)	2.00	
Can Llimó	2.25	
Can Ahir	2.50	
Roca Roja	2.75	passing loop
Es Control	3.45	Car Parking
Sa Torre (Port de Sóller)	3.70	
S'Espléndido (Port de Sóller)	3.80	
Las Palmeras (Port de Sóller)	3.90	
S'Eden (Port de Sóller)	4.10	
Can Generós (Port de Sóller)	4.30	
Marysol (Port de Sóller)	4.65	northern passenger terminal, passing loop
La Payesa (Port de Sóller)	4.86	no passenger service, shunting only

== Rolling stock ==
The rolling stock of the Tranvía comprises:

Media	Fleet №	Qty.	Built in	Manufacturer	Acquired in	Acquired from	Retired in
	1-3	3	1913	Cardé y Escoriaza	1913	(acquired new)	(in service)
The original motor cars of the tramway, built in Zaragoza
	5-6	2	1913	Cardé y Escoriaza	1913	(acquired new)	(in service)
The original trailer cars of the tramway, built in Zaragoza
	8-11	4	1890	Cardé y Escoriaza	1954	Palma de Mallorca	(in service)
Open trailer cars.
	4	1	1932	Cardé y Escoriaza (Brill)	1958 May	Bilbao	2000
Motorcar built from decommissioned Bilbao material: U-52’s box on a Brill 21-E truck from a “Burceña” car. Back in service in Bilbao after restoration.
	7	1	1932	Cardé y Escoriaza	1958 May	Bilbao	2000
Trailer built from decommissioned Bilbao U-55’s box; restored to its original condition in 2003, it is in the Azpeitia museum.
	20-24	5	1937	Carris (Maley & Taunton; Metrovick)	1997-2001	Lisbon	(in service)
Motor cars built in 1936-1940 by Lisbon’s Carris on Maley & Taunton trucks with Metrovick equipment. Adapted in 1997-1998 to 914 mm (3 ft) gauge from their original 900 mm (2 ft 11 7/16 in) gauge. Starting in 2012 rebodying to match series 1-3 in progress: FS No. 22, FS No. 21, FS No. 23, and FS No. 24 completed.
	1-7	7	2001-2002*	Ferrocarriles de Sóller	2001-2002*	(own construction)	(in service)
Open trailer cars, built by the tramway itself; removable windows and sides can be added for the colder season. (* Trailer FS No. 7, built to the same specs, added later.)

== Gallery ==
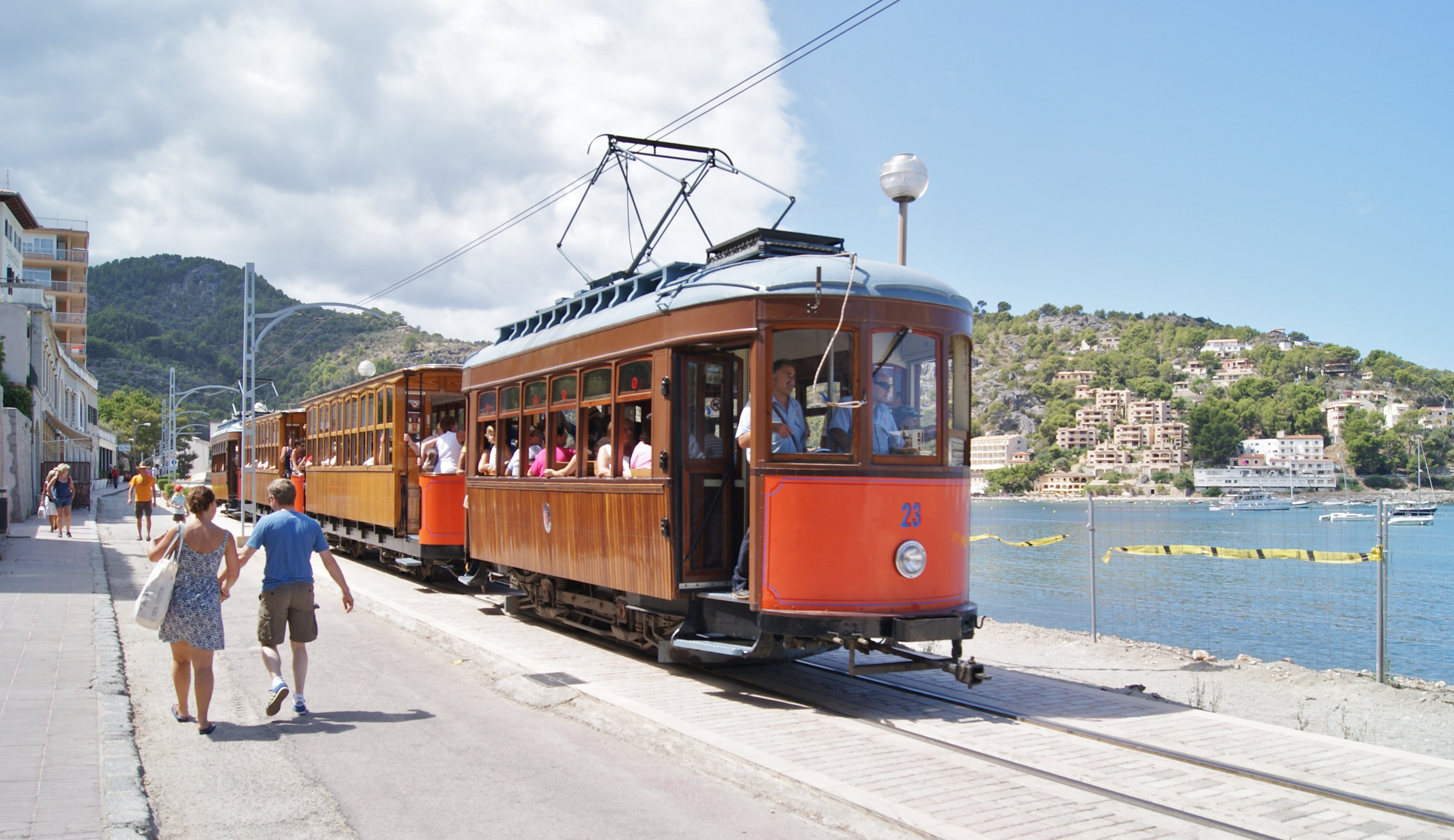
Tram 23 along the seafront

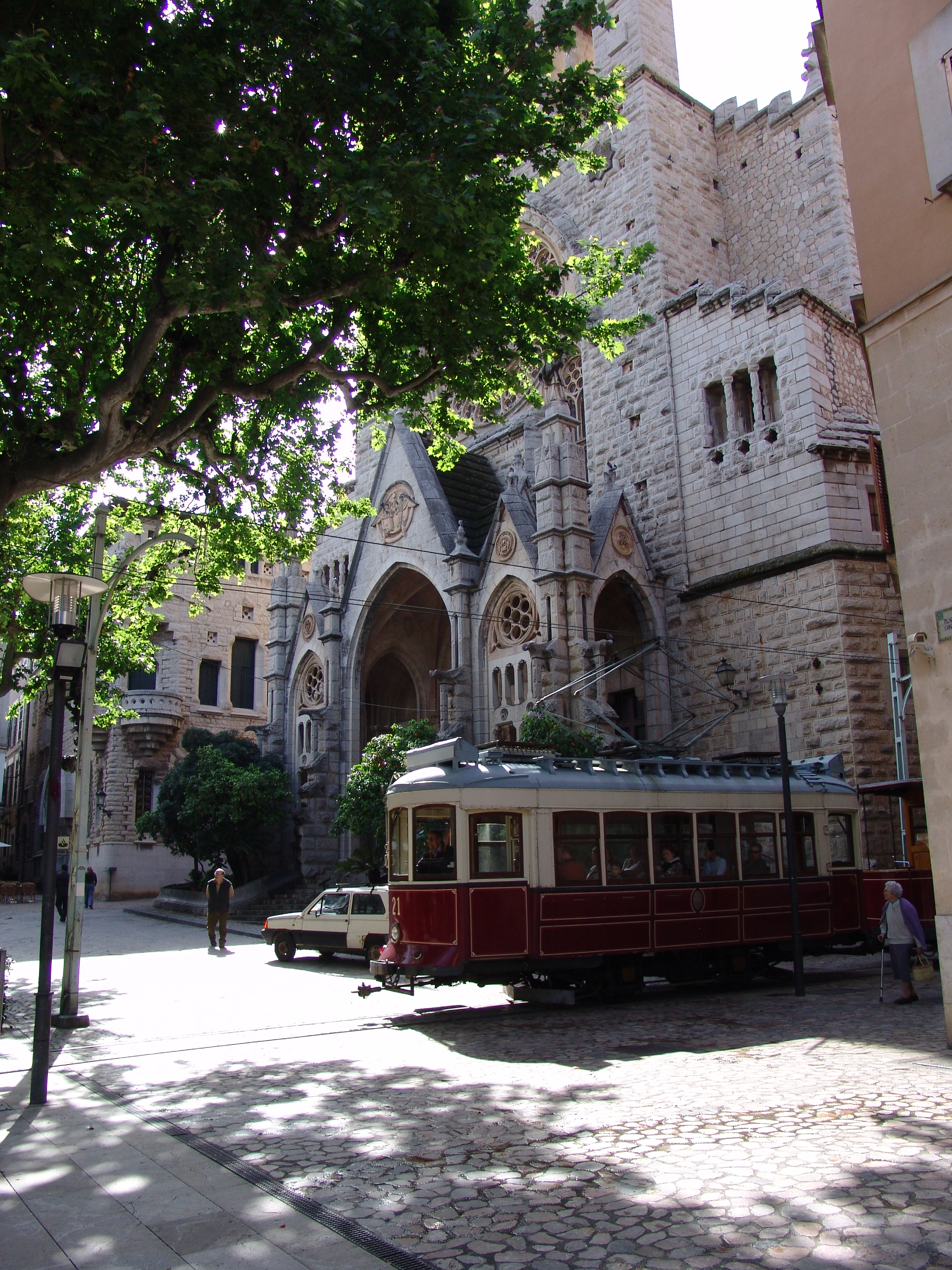
Tram 21 near Sóller Mercat stop, passing close to the church of San Bartolomé

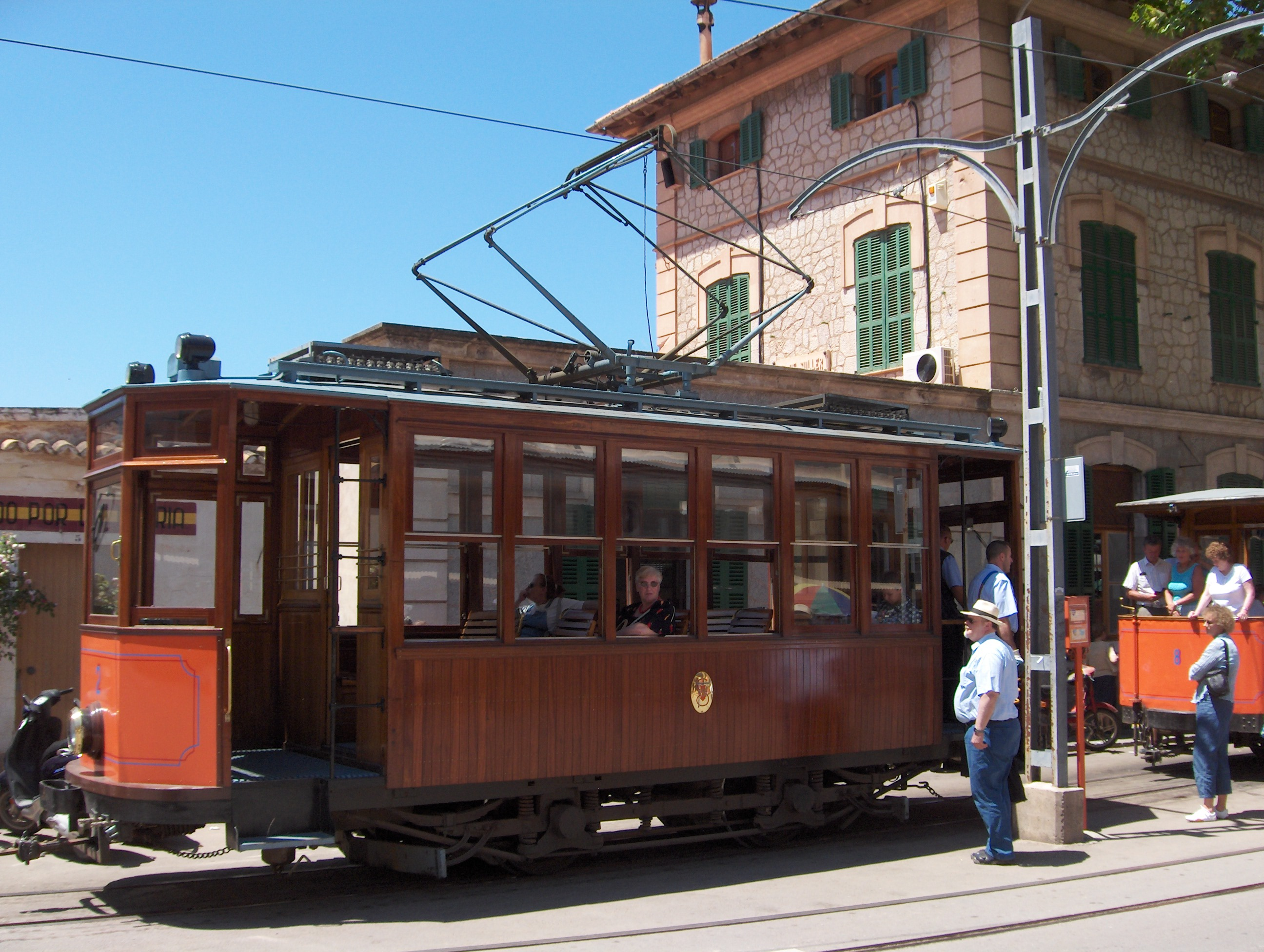
Old tram 2 at Marysol station (Port de Sóller)

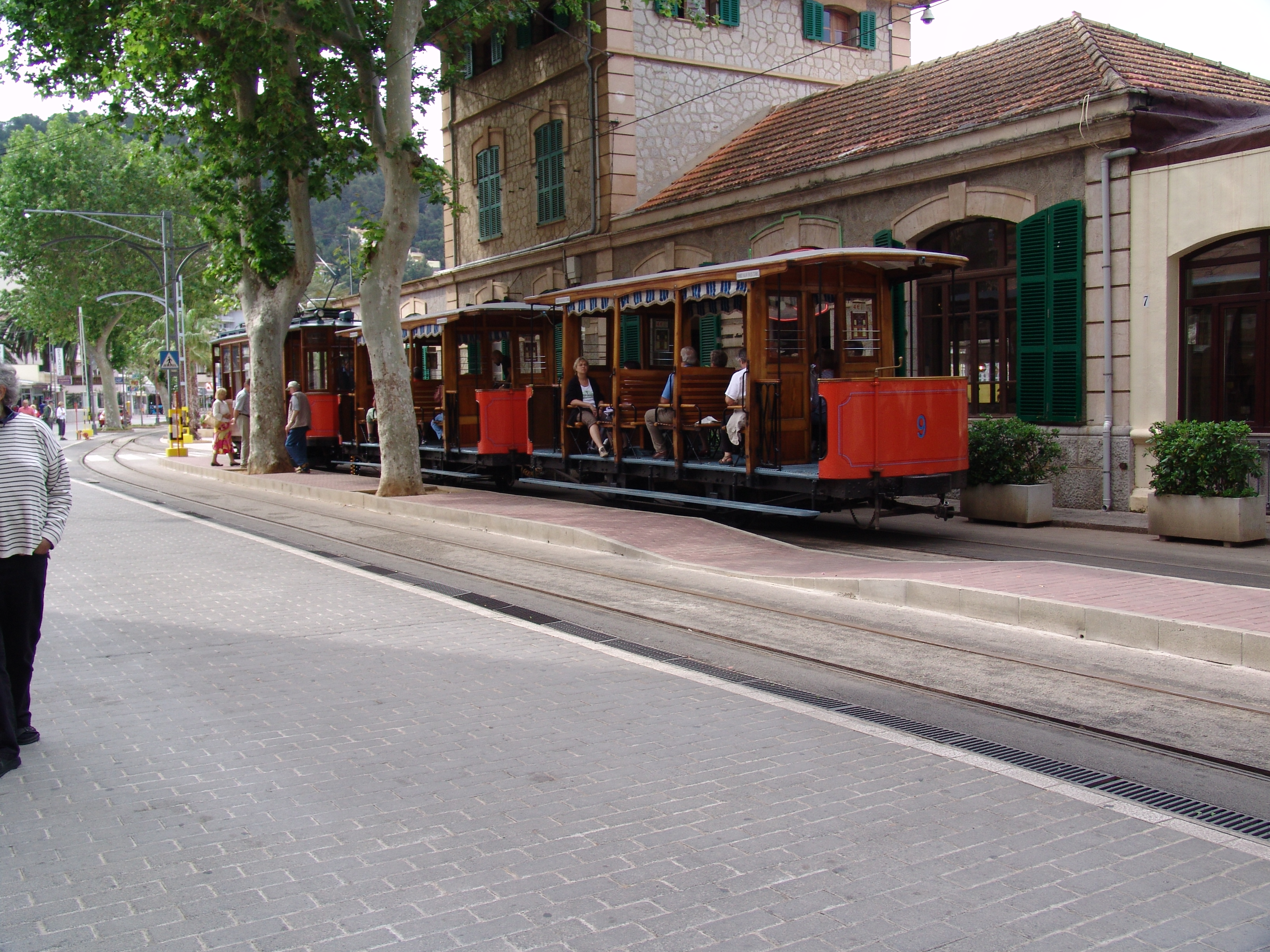
Marysol station building

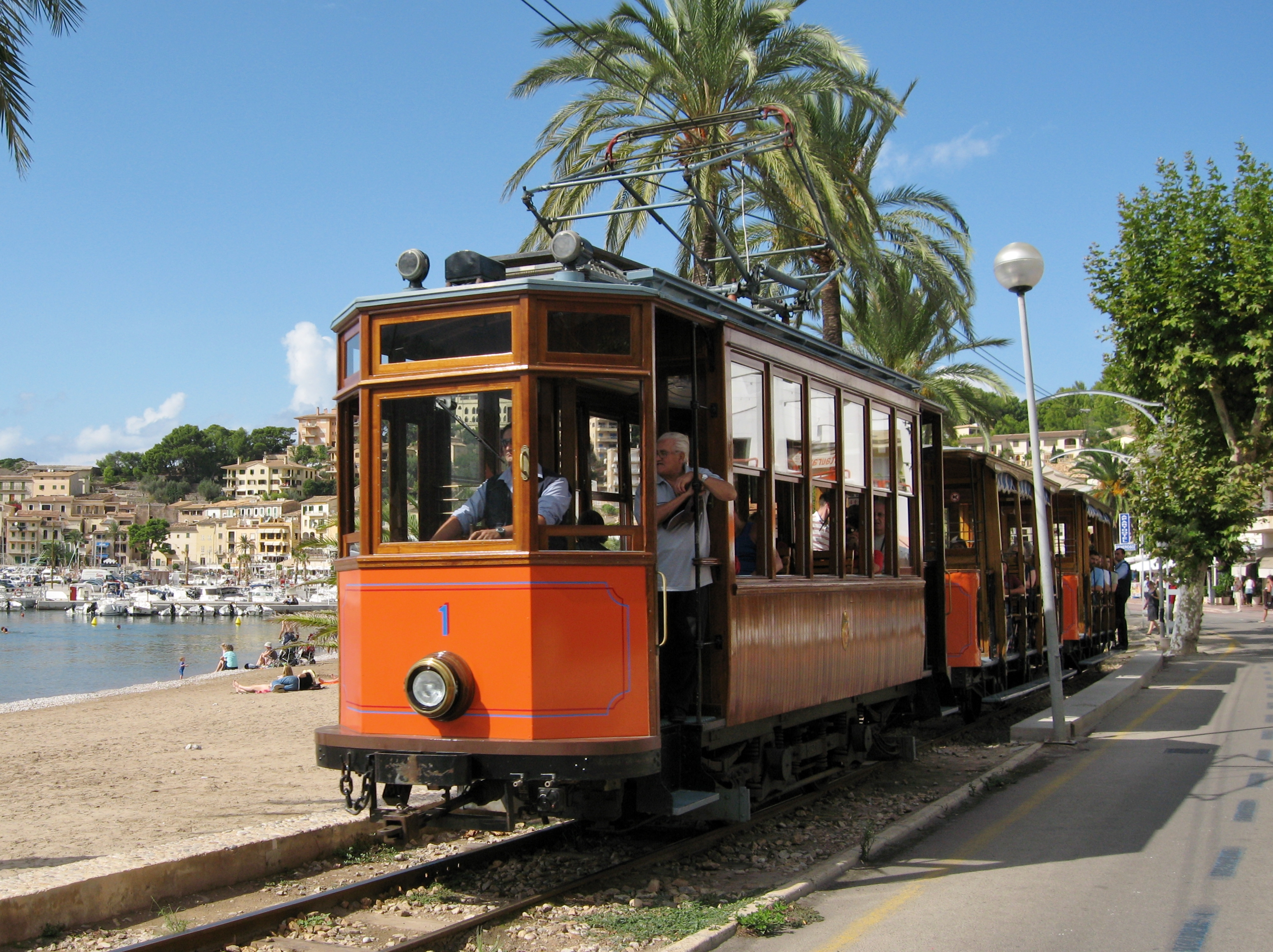
Old tram 1 along the coast

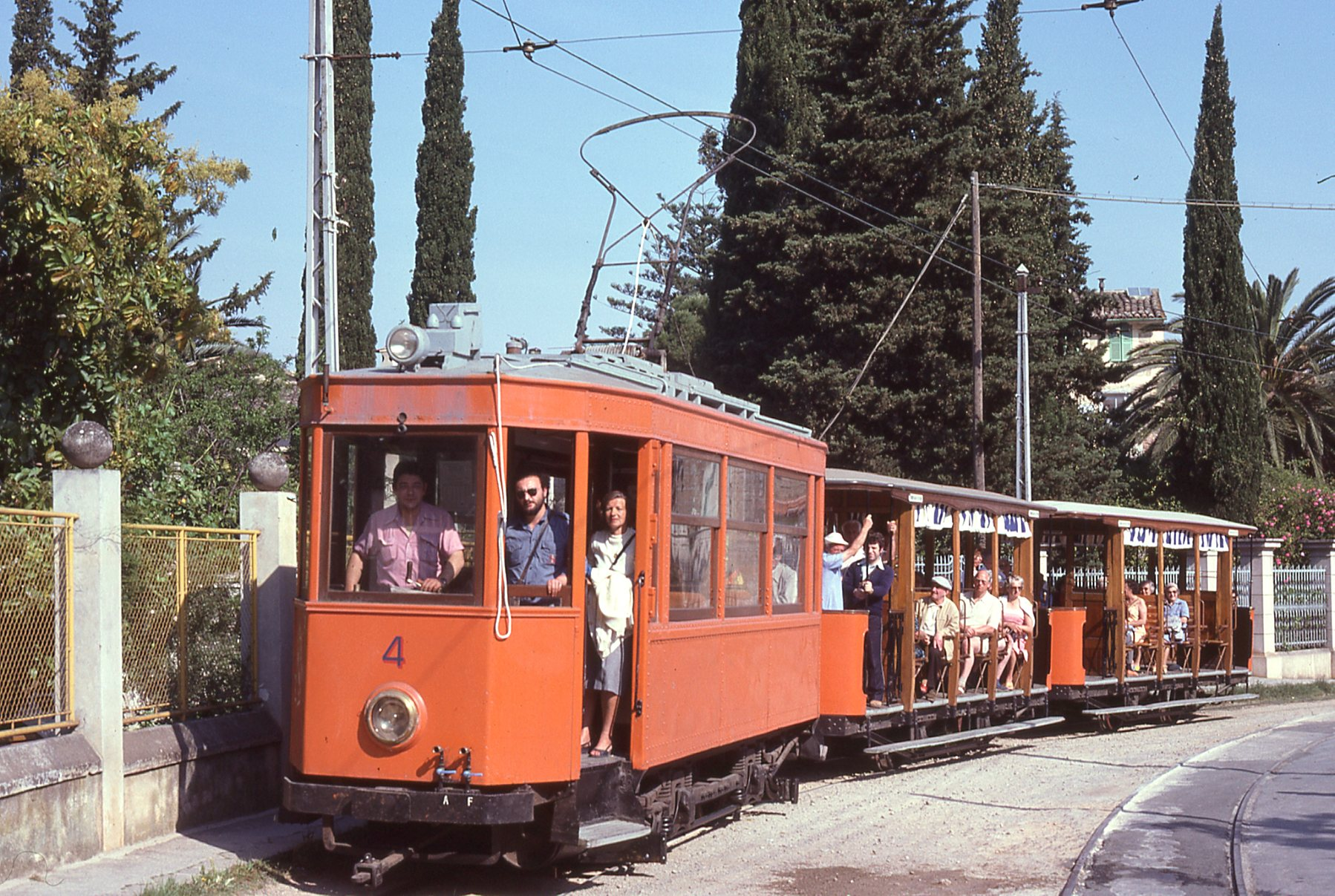
Tram 4 with two open jardineras (trailers) in 1979

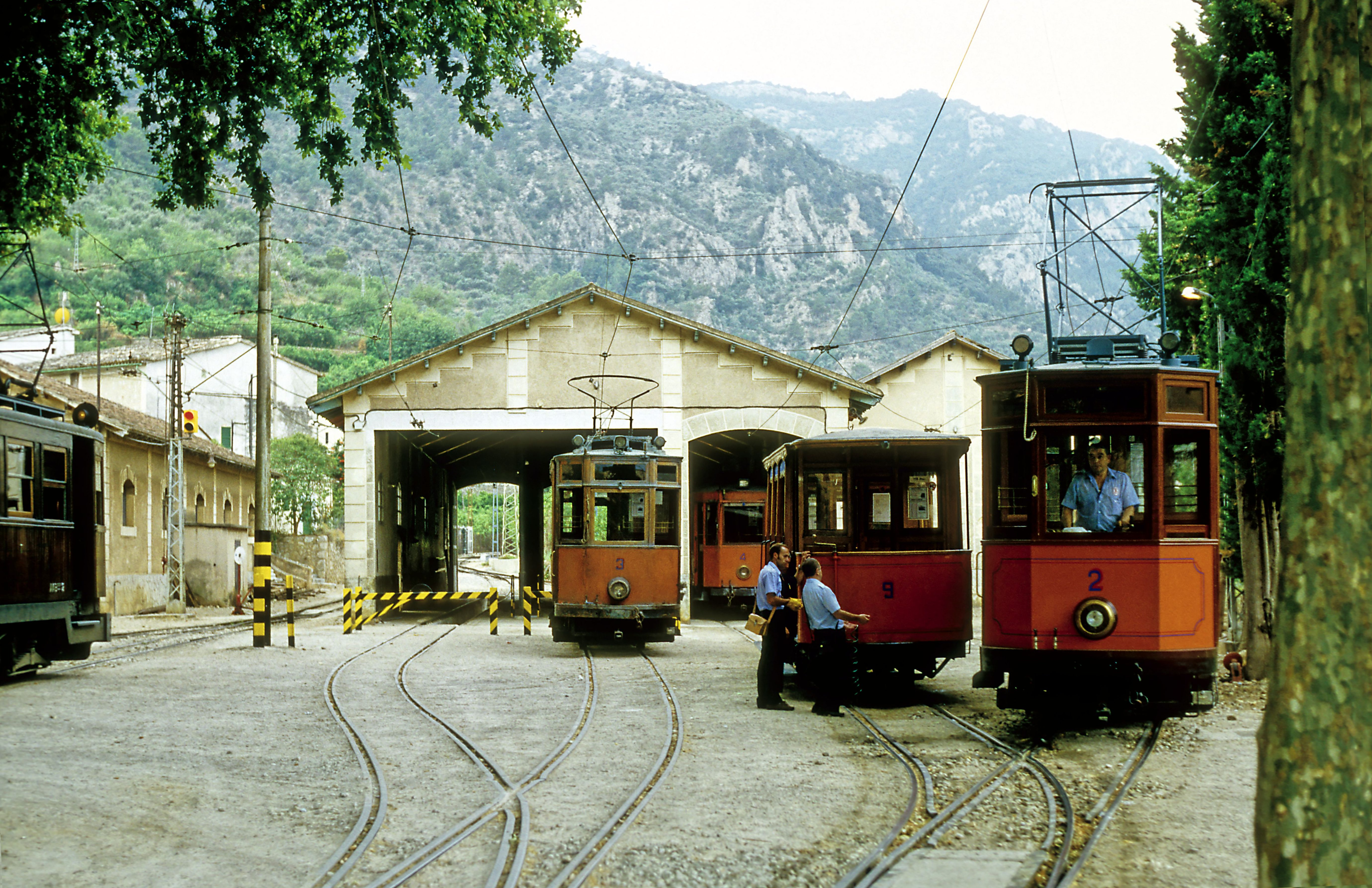
The Sóller tram depot

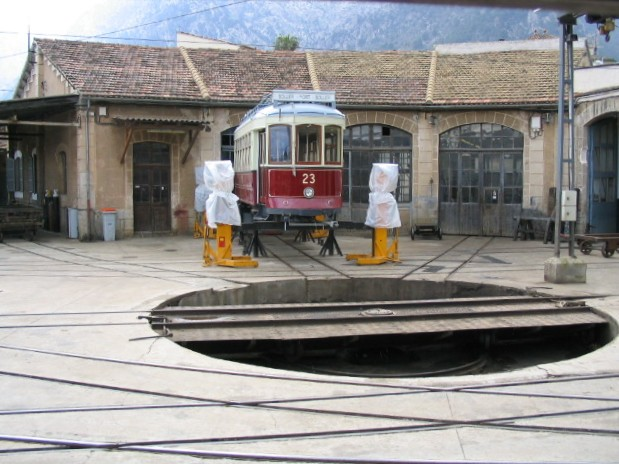
Sóller roundhouse, turntable & Porto 23 car body, on 10 04 2004

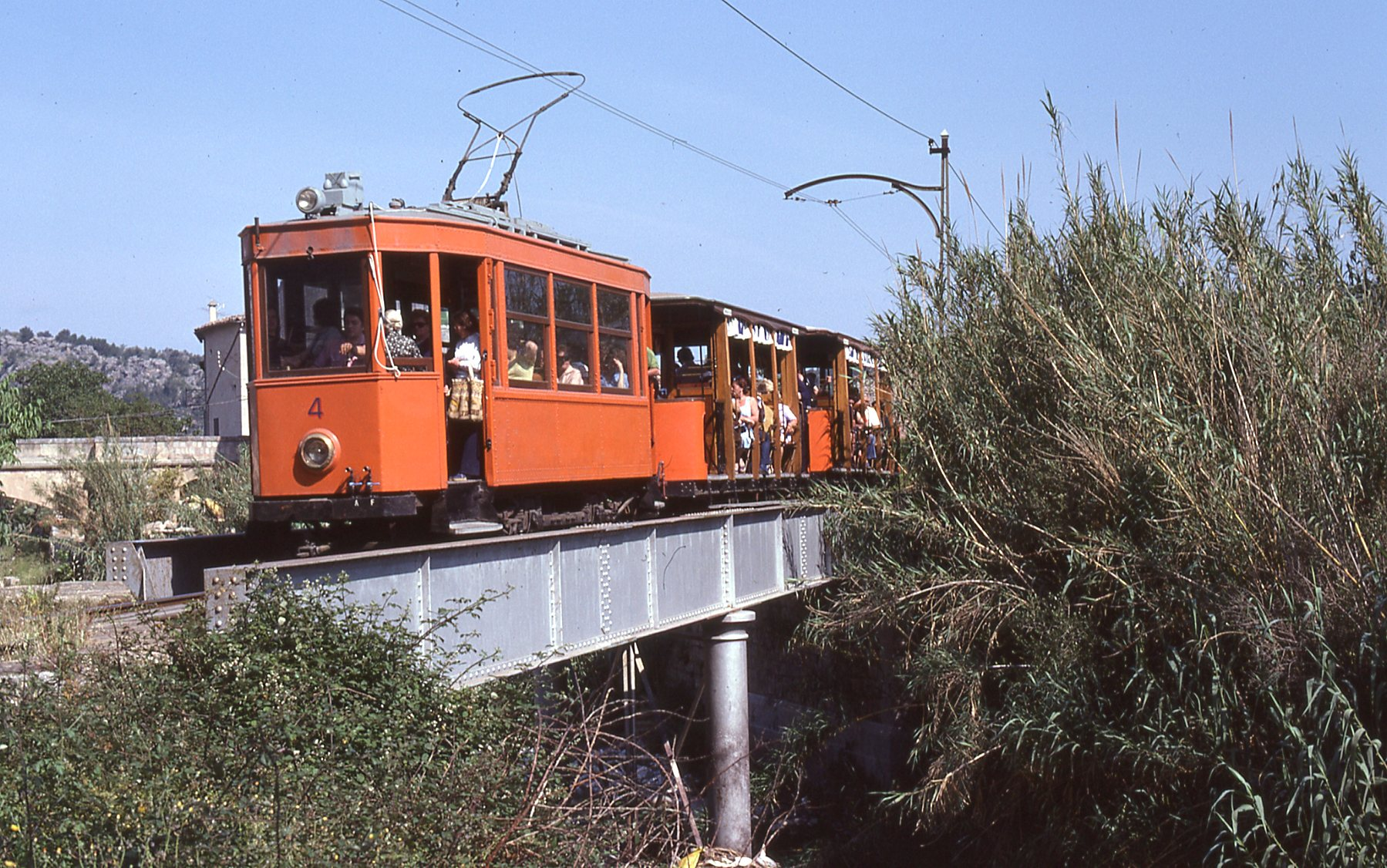
Tram 4 on a bridge

== See also ==
- List of town tramway systems in Spain
- Majorca rail network (scheme map)
- Palma Metro
- Serveis Ferroviaris de Mallorca
