= Port de Sóller =

- Village
- Port de Sóller (in Catalan); Puerto de Sóller (in Spanish)
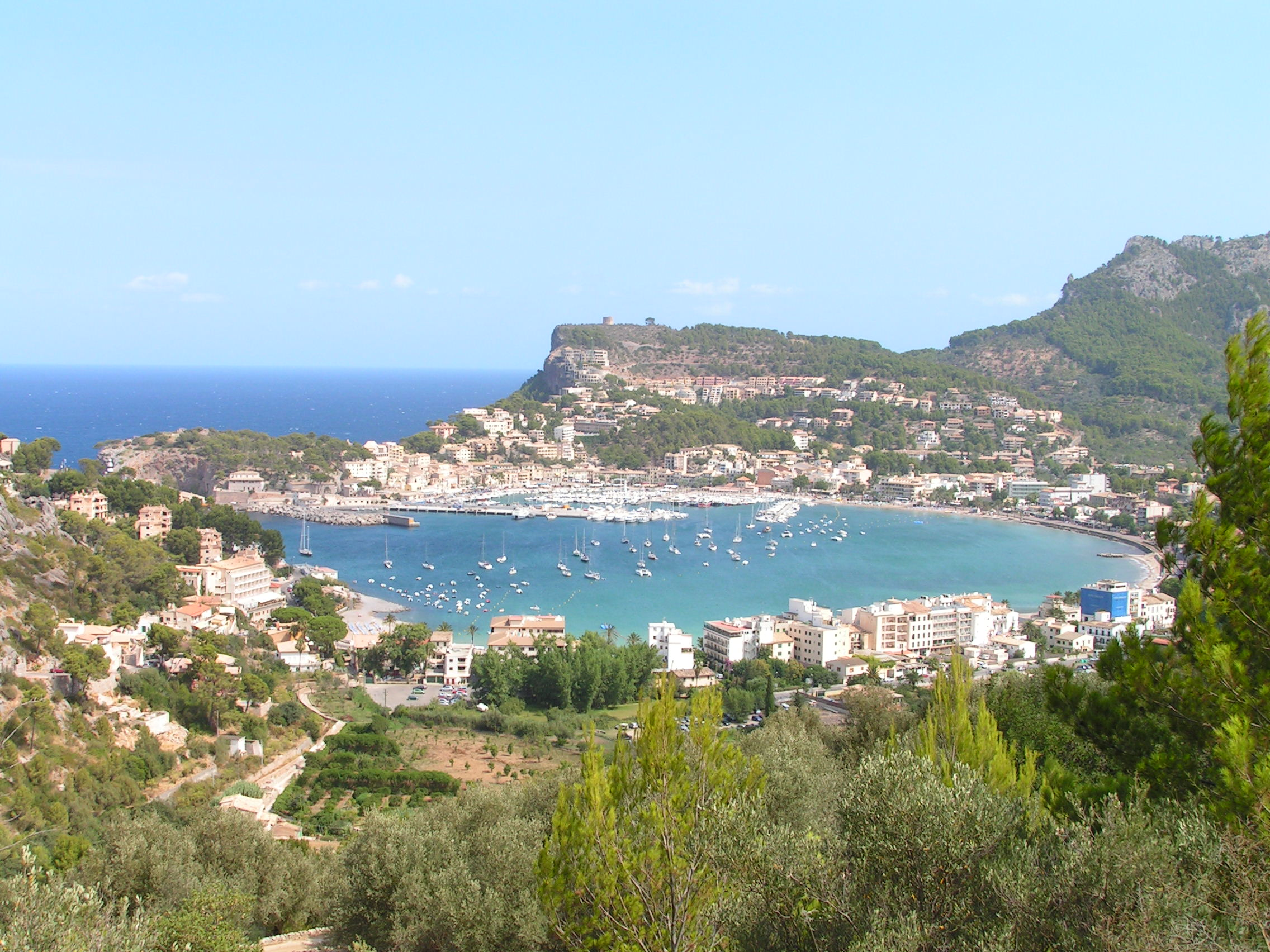
- Port de Sóller viewed from hills to the south

- Location in Spain
- Coordinates: 39°47′55″N 2°41′37″E
- Country: Spain
- Autonomous community: Balearic Islands
- Province: Balearic Islands
- Island: Mallorca
- Comarca: Serra de Tramuntana
- Judicial district: Palma de Mallorca
- Municipality: Sóller
- Elevation: 5 m (16 ft)

Population (2011)
  - Total: 2,909
- Demonym(s): Solleric, Sollerica
- Time zone: UTC+1 (CET)
  - Summer (DST): UTC+2 (CEST)
- Postal code: 07100
- Official language(s): Catalan and Spanish

Port de Sóller (Catalan pronunciation: [ˈpɔɾd də ˈsoʎə]) is a village and the port of the town of Sóller, in Mallorca, in the Balearic Islands, Spain. Along with the village of Fornalutx and the hamlet of Biniaraix they combine to form Sóller. The combined population is around 12,000. A tramway links the inland town of Sóller to Port de Sóller, running along the beach-side road.

== Overview ==
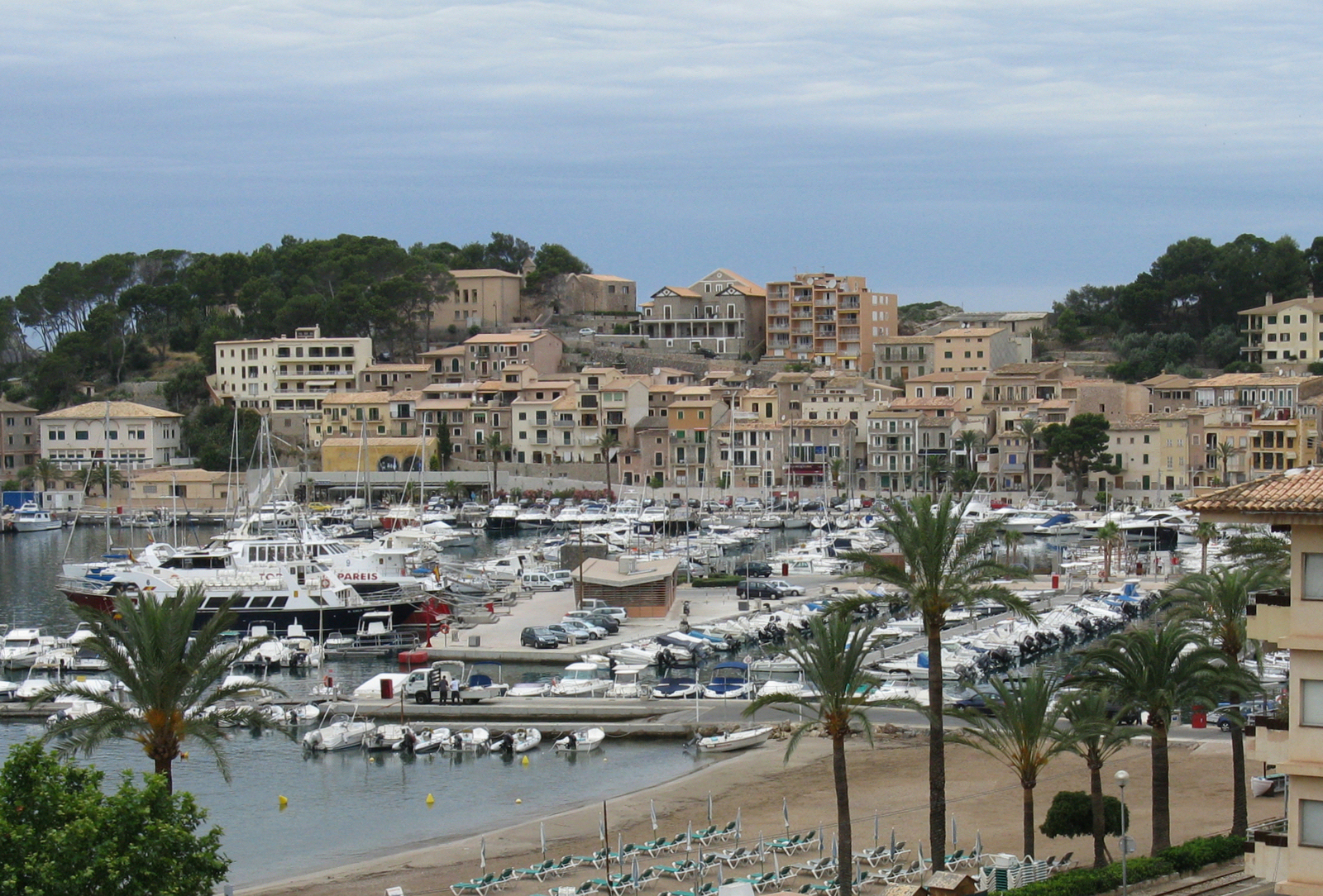
Port de Sóller marina

The resort consists of shops, restaurants and bars but is quiet and away from the major tourist areas such as Magaluf on the south of the island. There are a few large holiday hotels such as Hotel Eden, Hotel Esplendido and Aimia Hotel, located on the road that runs around the bay.

Two lighthouses sit on the headlands on either side of the bay, La Badia de Sóller. Development on the east headland has been prevented by the area being used as a training ground by the Spanish Army.

The beach sand was replaced for the summer of 2009 because, whilst clean, it had become rather muddy and inhospitable.

The bay and the estuary of the river which comes to an end here attract little egrets, Muscovy ducks, huge flocks of herring gulls, greylag geese and mallard ducks. The diversity of breeds in the duck and geese population suggests that most of the original birds had escaped from captivity.

== History ==
On 16 May 1946 the town was struck by a tornado, rated F1 on the Fujita scale, which injured 100 people. The European Severe Storms Laboratory noted that the rating was based on a written account of the damage by Gayà, M.

== Transport ==
The tramway connecting the town to Sóller opened in 1913 and is about 5 km long. Some of its original, 1913-built cars are still in service on the line. A bus service links the resort to Palma, the capital of the island.

== Gallery ==
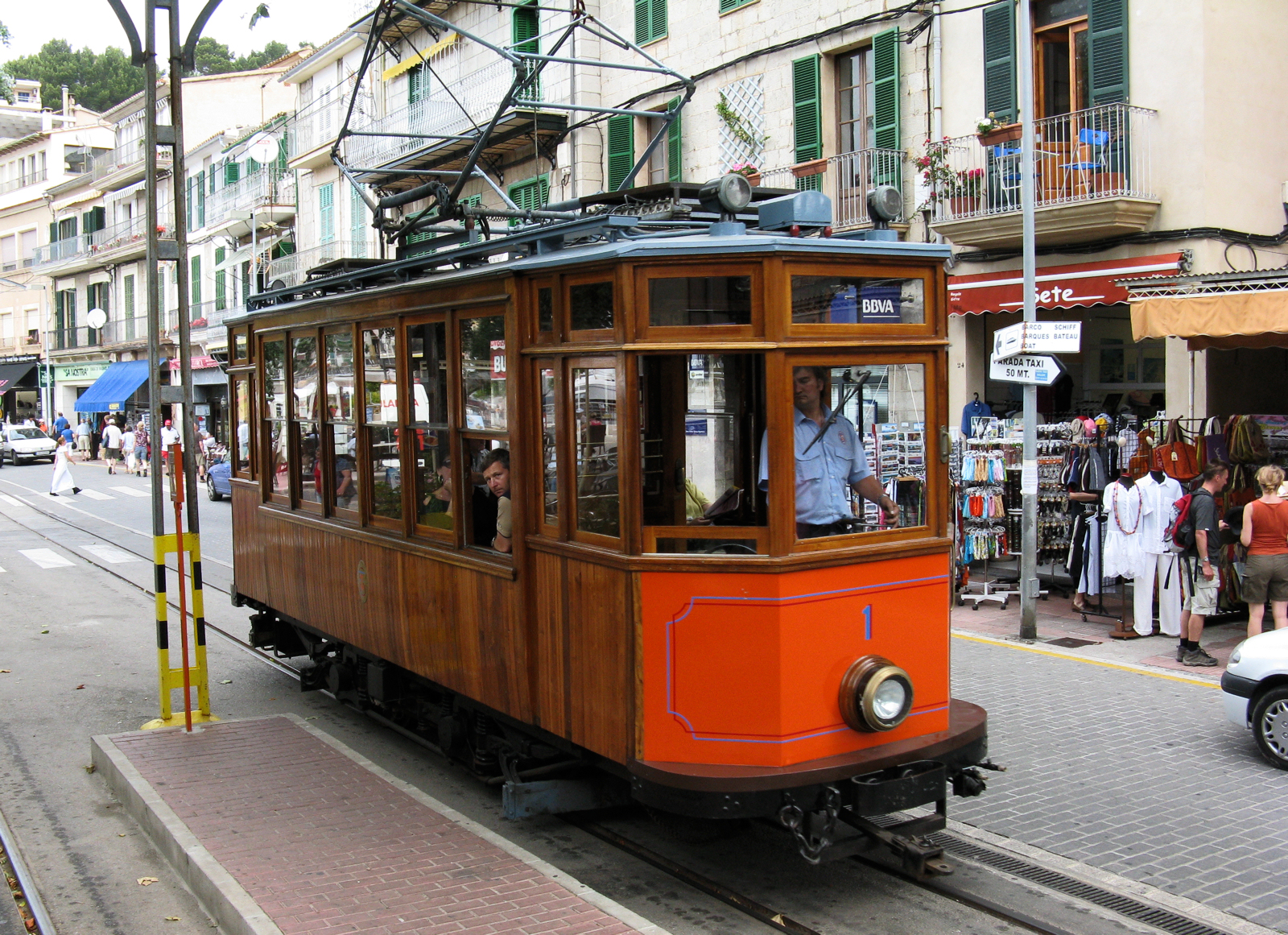
The tram to Sóller in Port de Sóller

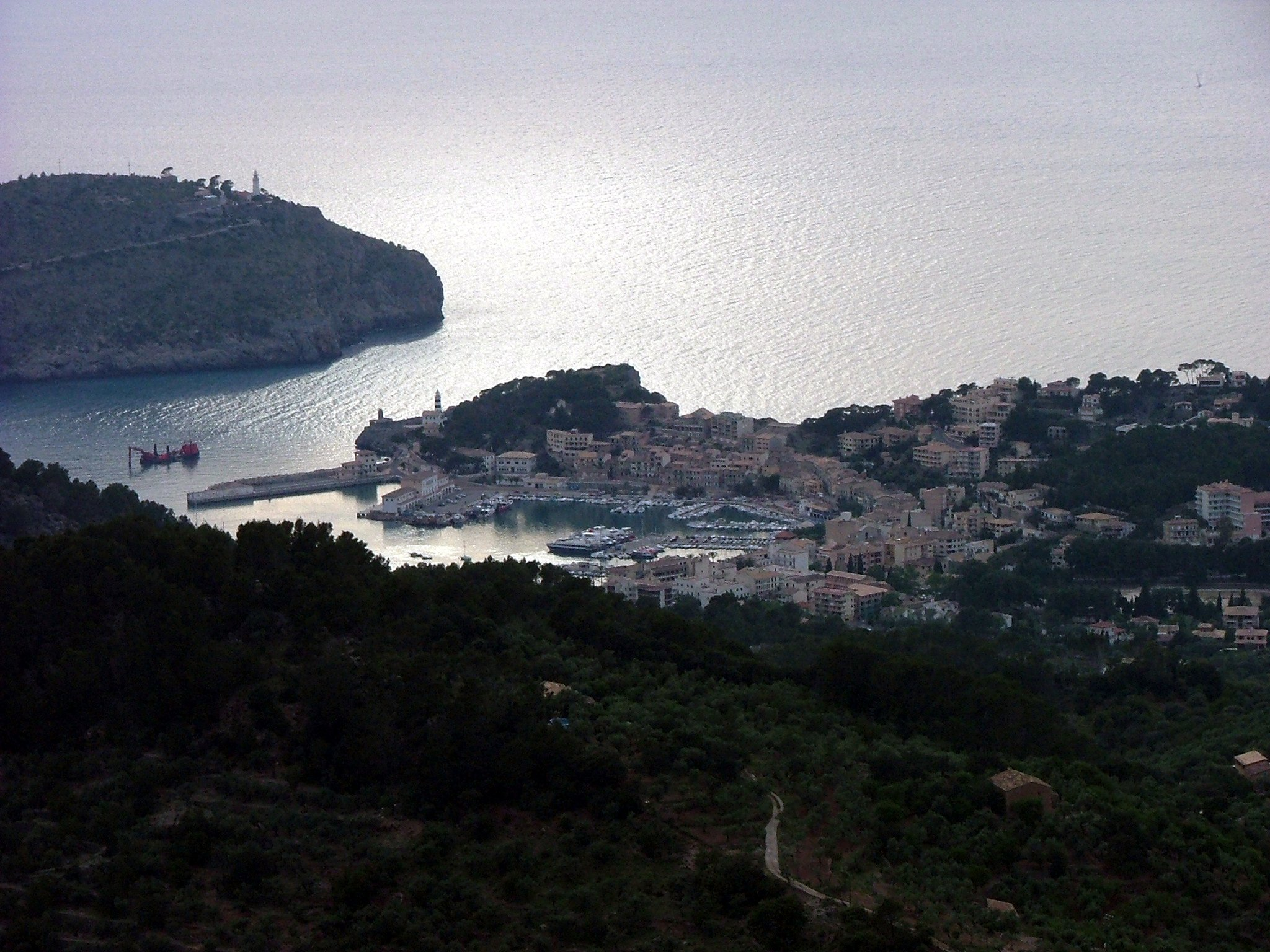
View of Port de Sóller with the bay and the lighthouse

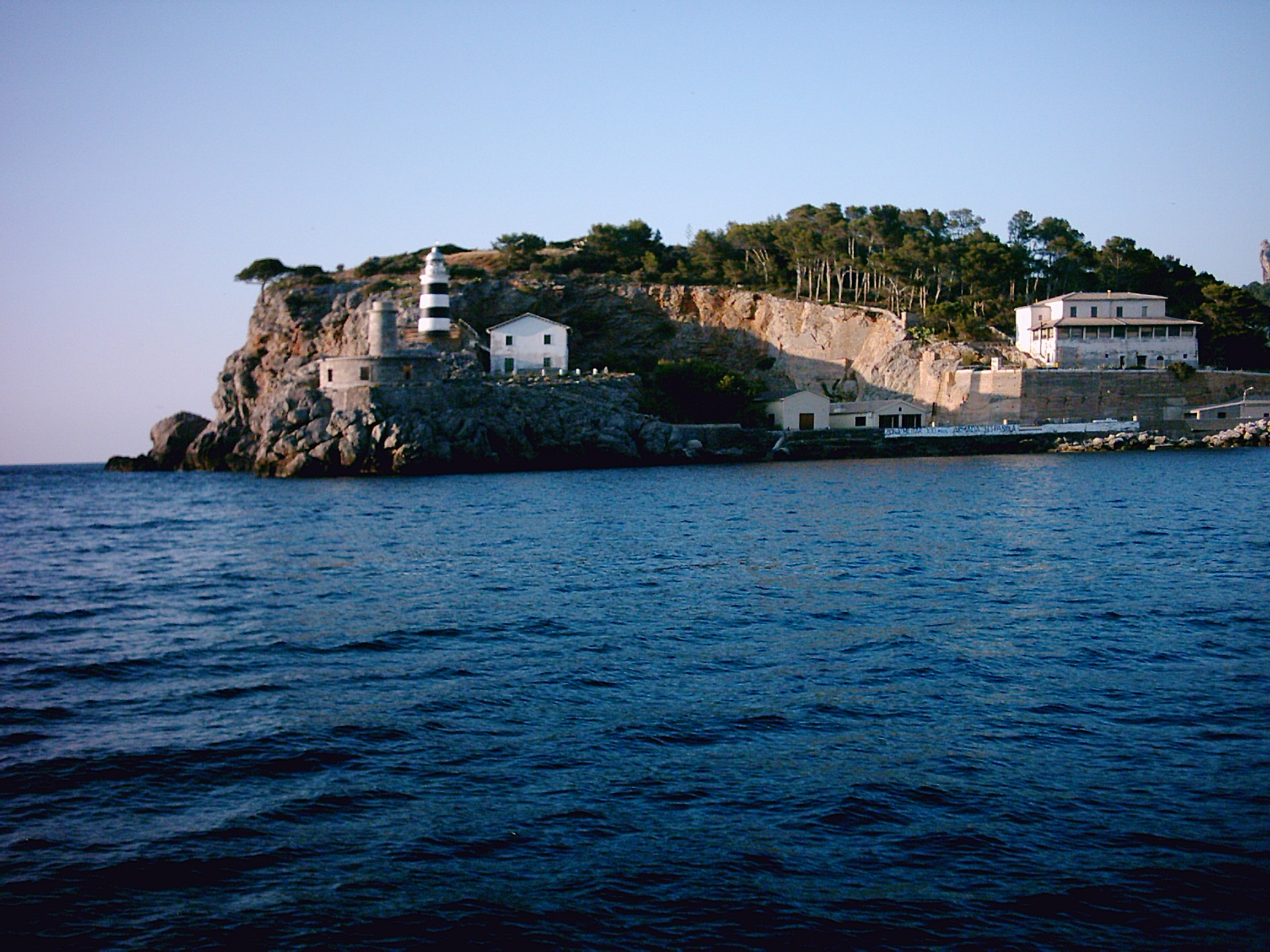
The lighthouse

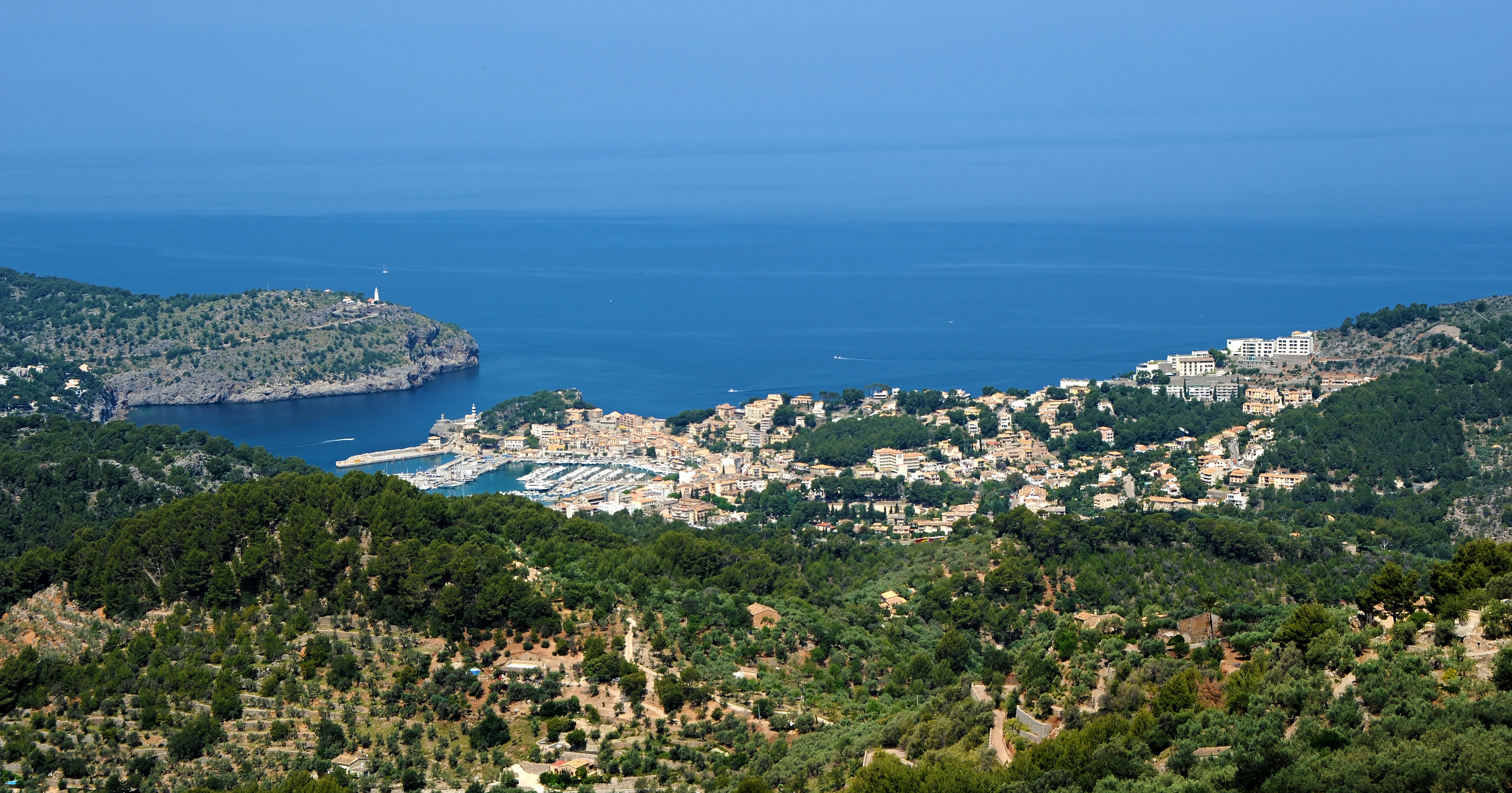
View of Port de Sóller
