= Sóller =

- Municipality
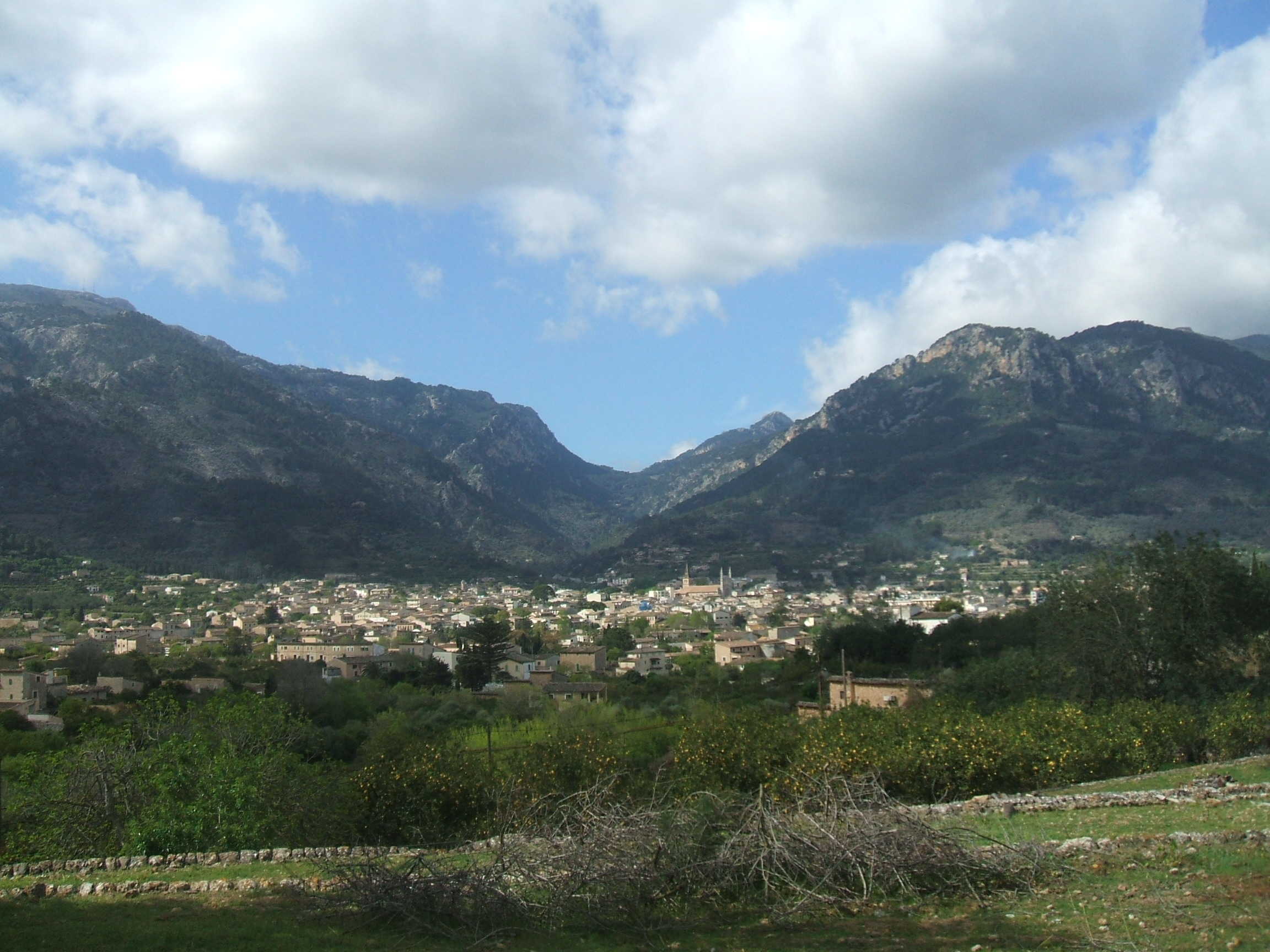
- Panorama of Sóller from the north

- Coat of arms

- Map of Sóller in Mallorca

- Location in Mallorca Sóller (Balearic Islands) Sóller (Spain)
- Coordinates: 39°46′3.18″N 2°42′50.36″E
- Country: Spain
- Autonomous community: Balearic Islands
- Province: Balearic Islands
- Island: Mallorca
- Comarca: Serra de Tramuntana
- Judicial district: Palma de Mallorca

Government
  - Alcalde: Carlos Simarro Vicens (PP)

Area
  - Total: 42.80 km^{2} (16.53 sq mi)
- Elevation: 59 m (194 ft)

Population (2025-01-01)
  - Total: 13,882
  - Density: 324.3/km^{2} (840.1/sq mi)
- Demonym(s): Solleric, Sollerica
- Time zone: UTC+1 (CET)
  - Summer (DST): UTC+2 (CEST)
- Postal code: 07100
- Official language(s): Catalan and Spanish
- Website: Official website

Sóller (Balearic Catalan: [ˈsoʎə]) is a town and municipality near the north west coast of the Balearic Island of Mallorca, Spain, 3 km inland from Port de Sóller, in a large, bowl-shaped valley that also includes the village of Fornalutx and the hamlets of Biniaraix and Binibassi. The population is around 14,000. The Tranvía de Sóller tram links Sóller to Port de Sóller.

== Overview ==
Sóller is linked by the historic railway, the Ferrocarril de Sóller, and by a highway with a tunnel, to the Mallorcan capital of Palma de Mallorca. The Ferrocaril was built on the profits from the orange and lemon trade and completed in 1911. The Andratx-Pollença highway also runs through the valley. The present-day economy is based mainly on tourism and the expenditure of foreign residents, complementary to the agricultural economy based around citrus and olive groves. Soller is unique compared to towns on the rest of the island due to its geographical isolation, being surrounded by the Serra de Tramuntana. This isolation from all other major towns on the island, made it easier to trade with French merchants arriving by sea.

== Main sights ==
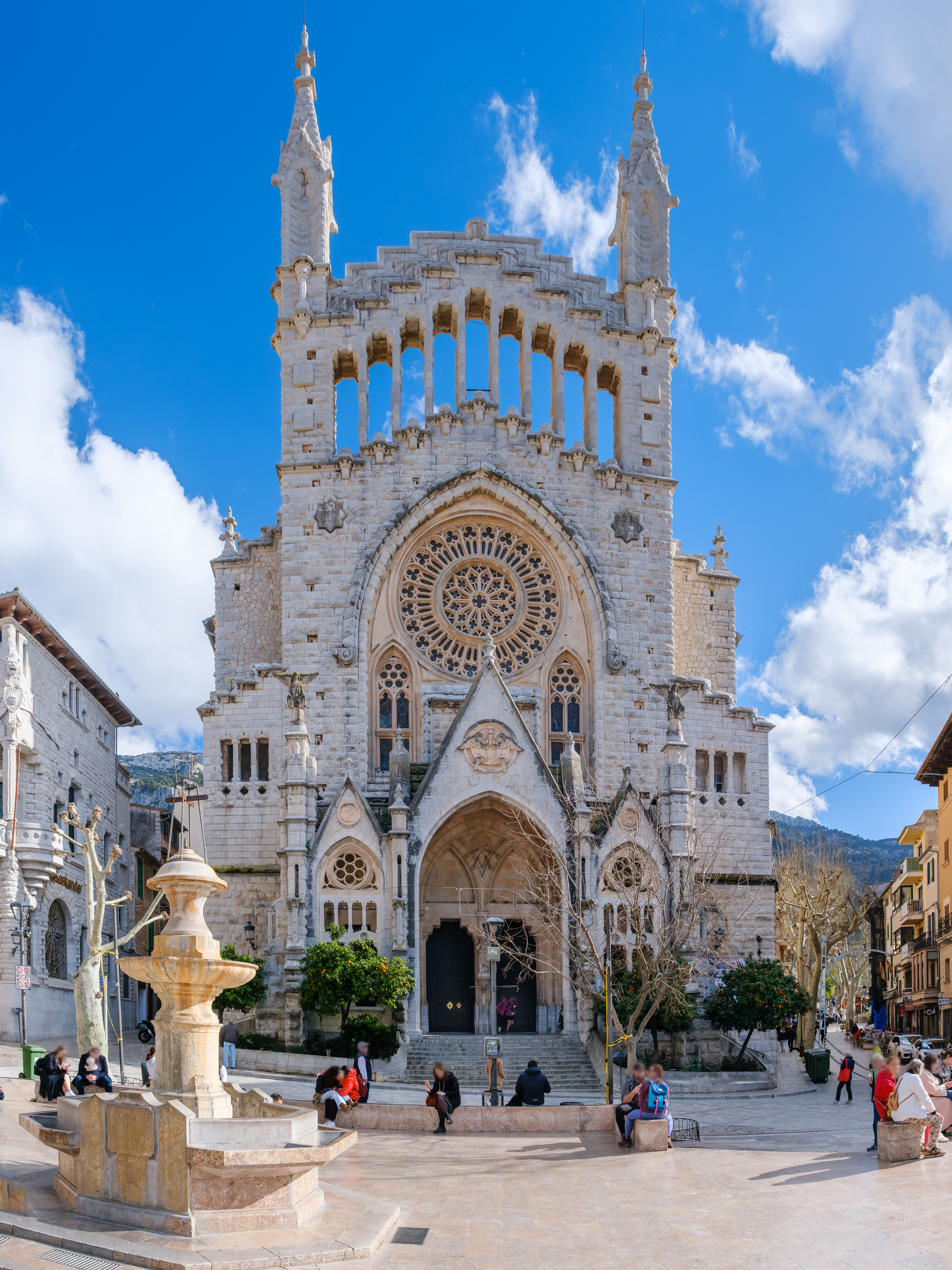
Sant Bartomeu Church

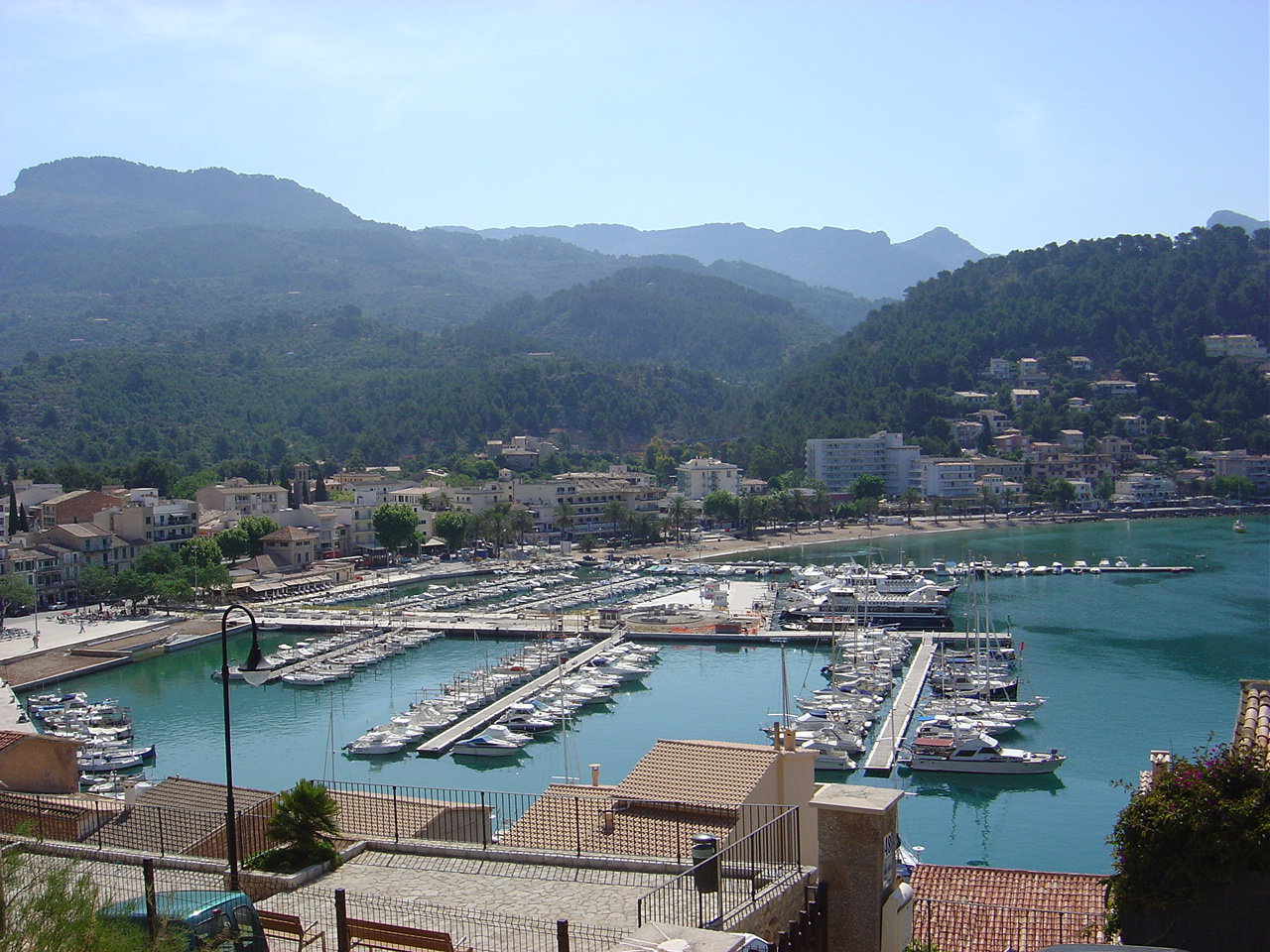
Port of Sóller

The focus of the town is the Plaça Constitució which is surrounded by cafés and has plane trees and a fountain in its centre. The tram passes through the Plaça on its way to and from the main station which has been restored to incorporate a museum of Picasso and Joan Miró. The church of Sant Bartomeu (Saint Bartholomew) facing the east side of the Plaça is flanked by the ajuntament (town hall) and the Banco de Sóller, a remarkable 1912 Modernista building with defining ironwork, by the Catalan architect Joan Rubió i Bellver, a follower of Antoni Gaudí. The bank's organisation was founded in 1889 with the money of emigrants who returned prosperous to Sóller. On the other hand, the church can clearly be seen standing out from the canopy of the town from other parts of the Vall de Sóller (the surrounding valley). The original building dates from some time before 1236. The current main interior structure is now largely baroque (1688–1733).

The campanar (belltower) blends in well with its neo-Gothic design. The remarkable façade is a 1904 construction, also by Joan Rubió. The old street plan is of Islamic origin and lined with historic houses of the sixteenth to eighteenth centuries. The town has a covered market and is bisected by a fast flowing river with a number of bridges. Sóller is also notable for the houses built in the early twentieth century by emigrants who returned wealthy to the town, particularly those on the Gran Via which reflect the fin de siècle Art Nouveau styles of France.

The renowned Jardí Botànic (botanical garden) is on the outskirts of the town and is laid out with the plants of the Balearics and the Mediterranean islands. The Modernista mansion in the garden houses El Museu Balear de Ciències Naturals (The Museum of Balearic Natural Sciences).

== Events ==
- "Firó" is Sóller's most important and well-known festival, commemorating its sacking by Moorish pirates on the 11 May 1561. As part of the festivities, 4 battles are reenacted (2 in the Port, 1 in La Huerta and 1 in the town square). Locals dress up as turbaned pirates or in traditional dress and stage mock battles to repel the invaders with fireworks.
- Since 1980, Sóller has hosted the "Sa Mostra" week-long international folklore festival between May and July. It was started by the traditional dance group "Aires Sollerics".
- August sees the celebration in honour of the patron saint of Sóller, St. Bartholomew, which features bonfires and devilish masquerades in a spectacle called the "correfoc" ("fire-run"). Local groups such as the "Escladabutzes" invade the town square in an allegory of hellfire, before being driven back by the "correaigua" ("water-run"), where the local fire department refreshes the crowds.
- Each January, Epiphany is celebrated as the Day of the Three Wise Kings, and processions of the Magi proceed from the Port to the town square, throwing sweets to crowds of eager children. Traditionally, it is more popular than the western Christmas on 25 December.

== Museums ==
- Museu de la Mar, a maritime museum. Located in the Oratori de Santa Caterina d'Alexandria (13th century), in the Port de Sóller.
- Museu de Sóller: Casal de Cultura (1640), an ethnographic museum and art gallery. Carrer de sa Mar, 13 (Sóller)
- Can Prunera (a.k.a. Can Magraner) (1911), a modernist townhouse museum. Carrer de sa Lluna 86 and 90 (Sóller)
- Museu de Ciències Naturals i Jardí Botànico (1985), the local botanical garden and natural sciences museum. Carretera al Port de Sóller

== Notable people ==
- Gregorio Bausá (1590–1656), painter
- Albert Hauf (born 1938), philologist
- Joan Miquel Oliver (born 1974), musician
- Tuni (born 1982), footballer
- Colm Meaney (born 1953), Irish actor

== Gallery ==
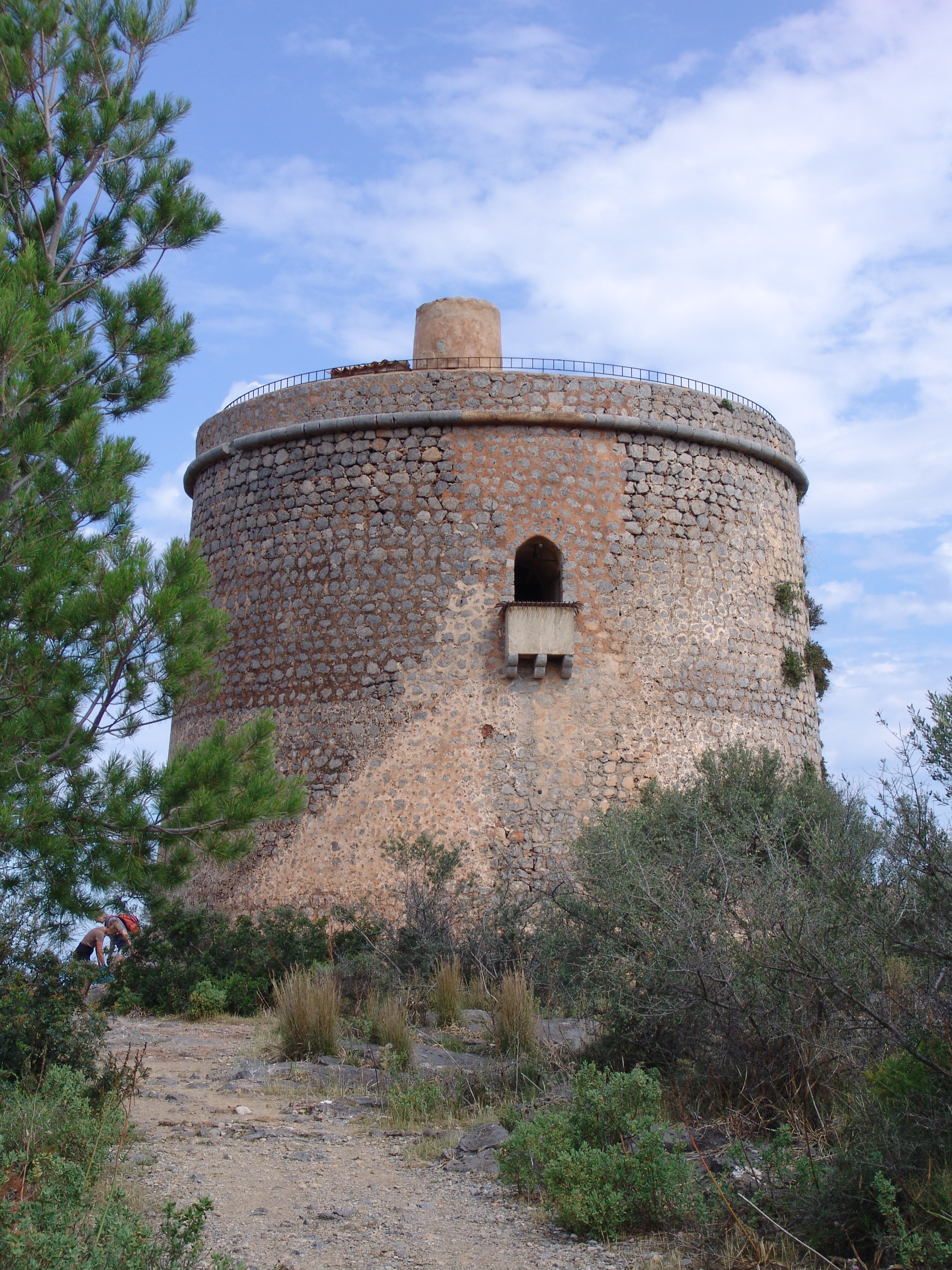
Torre Picada

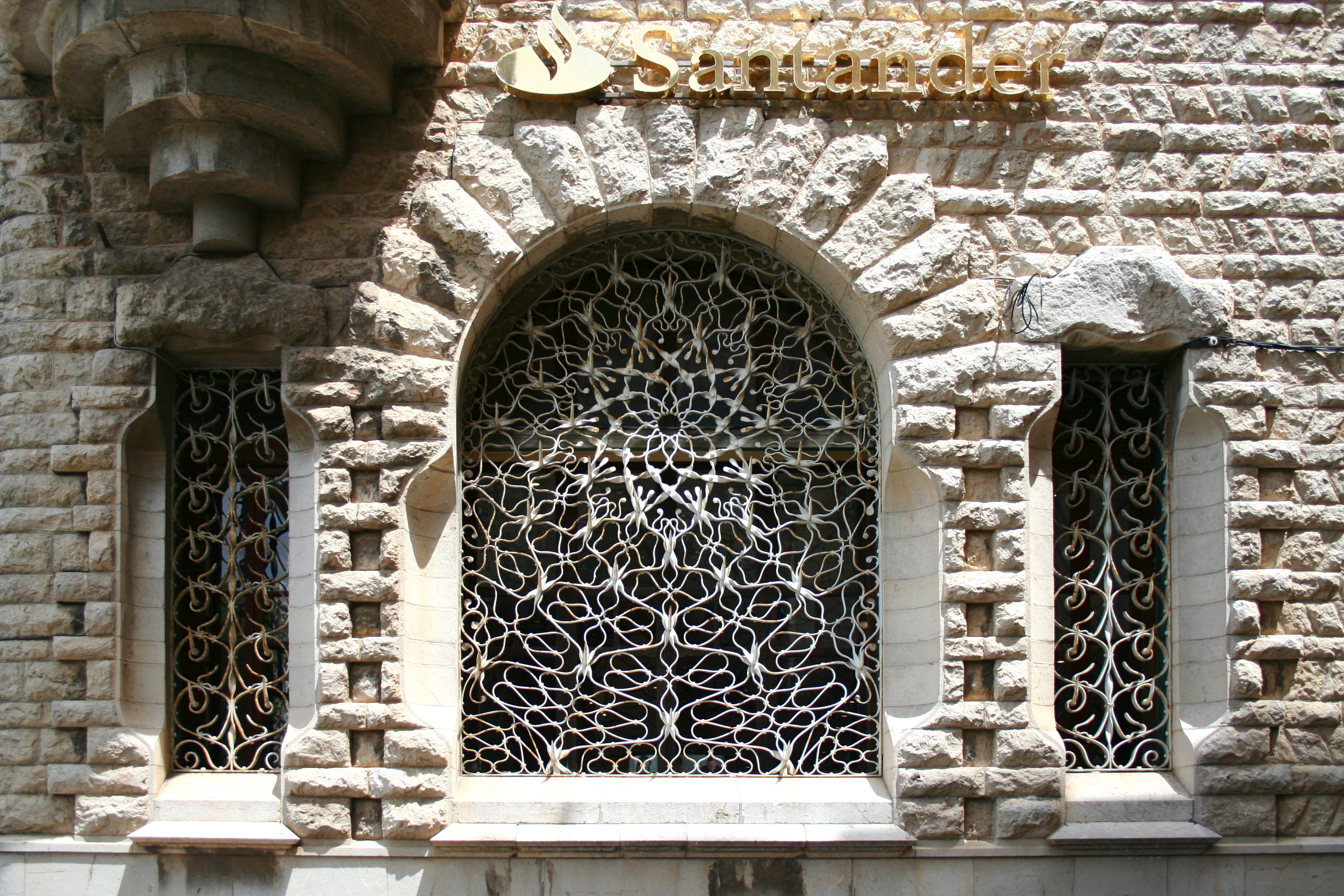
The Banco de Sóller

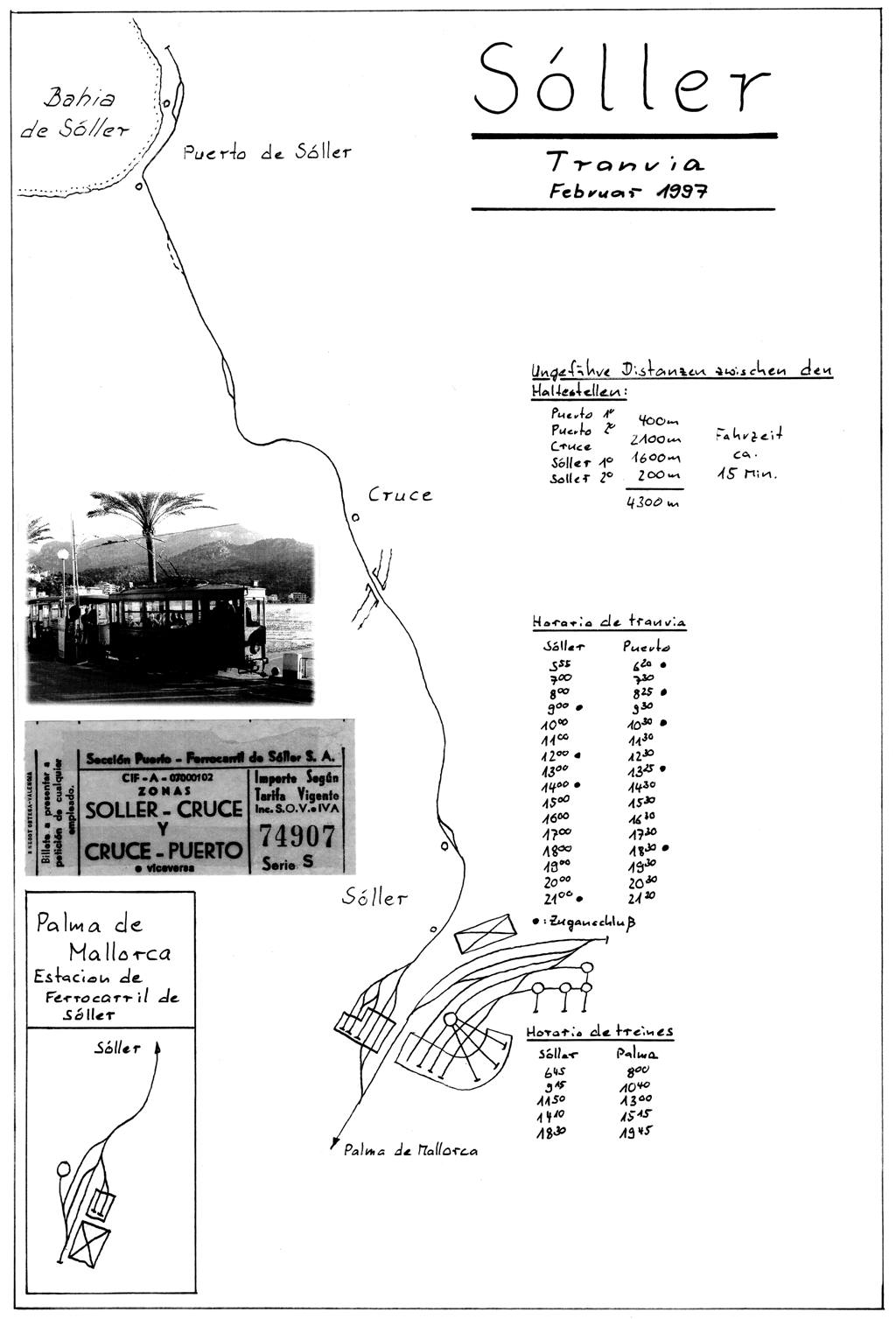
Map of the Sóller Tramway

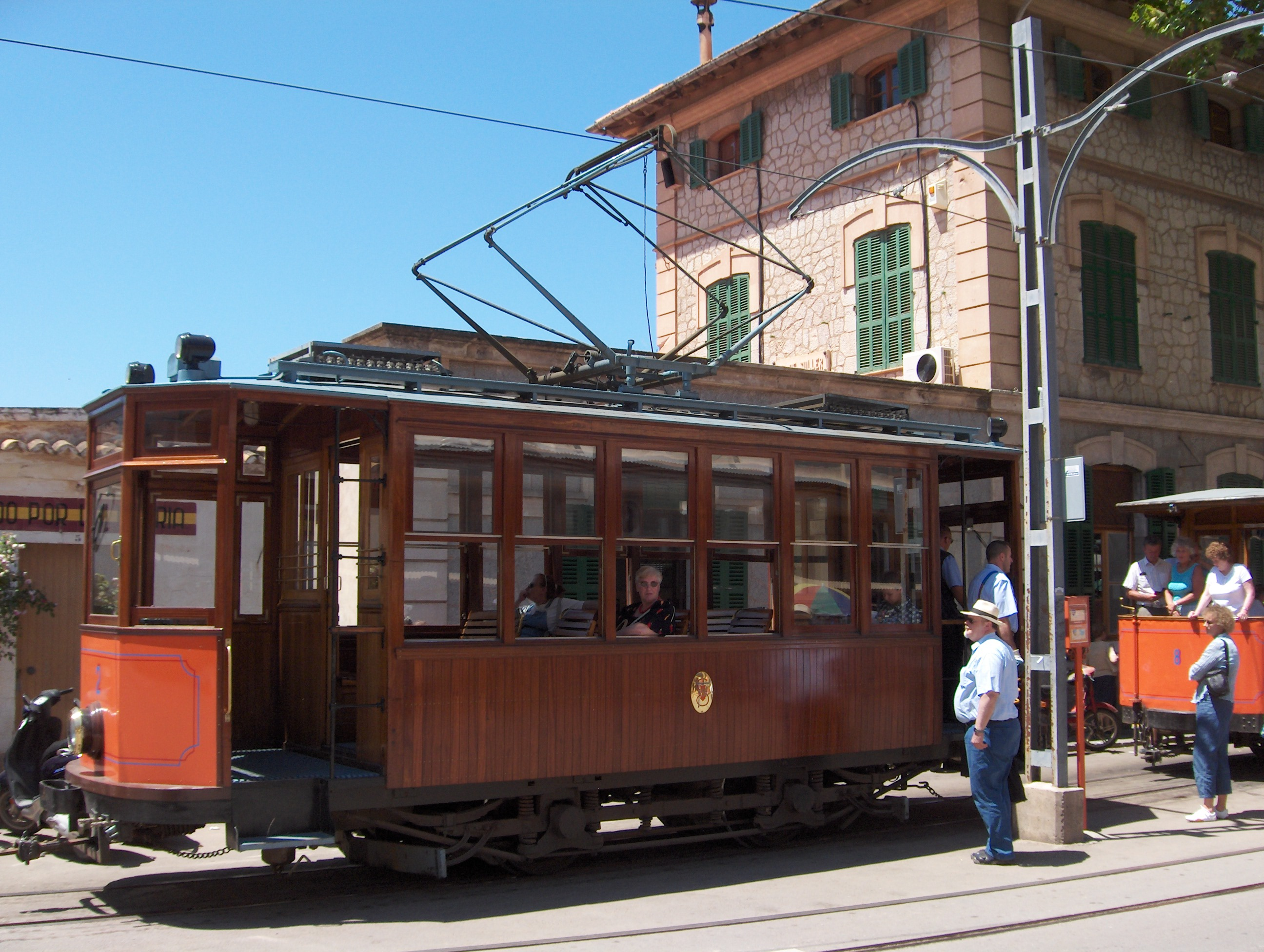
A tramcar in the Port of Sóller

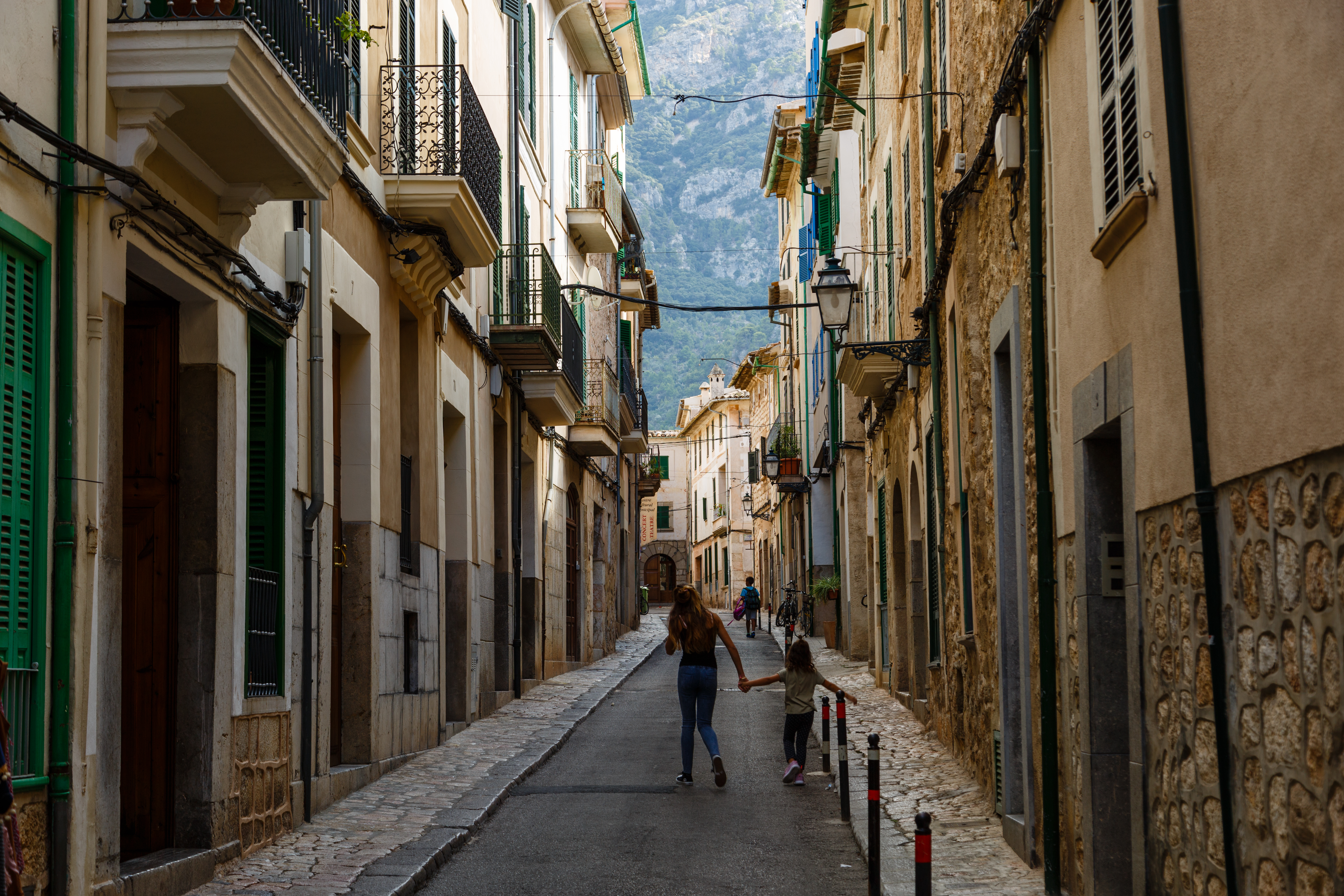
The old town of Sóller

== See also ==
- Cercle Solleric
- CF Sóller
- Els Cornadors
- Ferrocarril de Sóller
- Port de Sóller
- Tranvía de Sóller
