= Fornalutx =

- Municipality
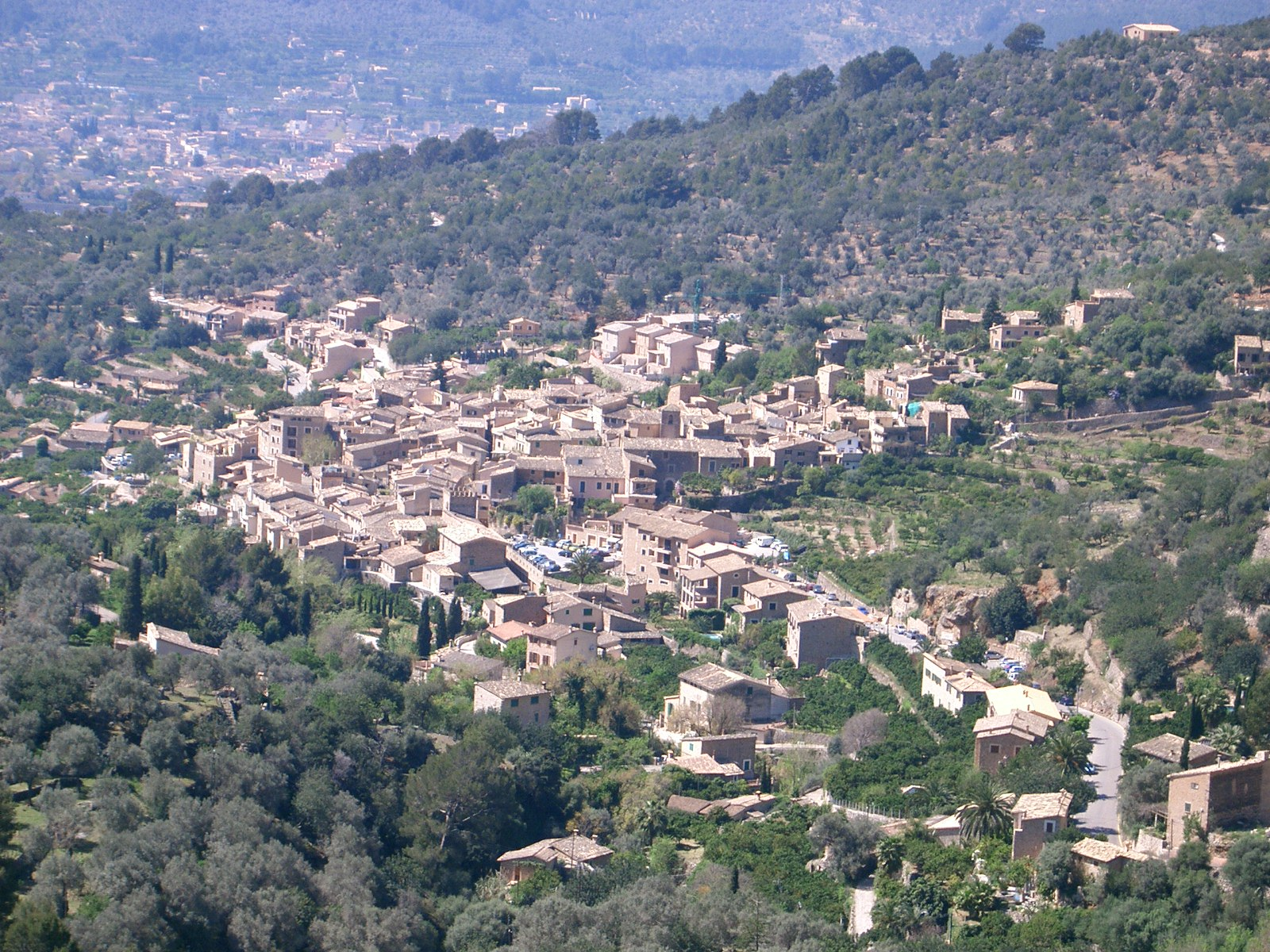
- Fornalutx

- Coat of arms

- Location within Mallorca

- Location in Mallorca Fornalutx (Balearic Islands) Fornalutx (Spain)
- Coordinates: 39°47′N 2°44′E
- Country: Spain
- Autonomous community: Balearic Islands
- Province: Balearic Islands
- Comarca: Serra de Tramuntana

Population (2025-01-01)
  - Total: 743
- Time zone: UTC+1 (CET)
  - Summer (DST): UTC+2 (CEST)

Fornalutx (Balearic Catalan: [foɾnəˈlutʃ]) is a municipality and village on Mallorca, one of the Balearic Islands, in Spain. It covers an area of 19.5 km² and has about 700 inhabitants.

Mallorcan Catalan (mallorquí) is the most popular local language—however, all residents speak Castilian Spanish as well.

== Geography ==
Fornalutx is a mountainous municipality. The nearest town is Sóller. Surrounding mountains include the Alfabia Mountains and the Els Cornadors.

== The village ==
The centre of Fornalutx is the Plaça d'Espanya, surrounded by cafés and a general store. Overlooking the square (on a higher level reached by steps) is the church, which has a large clock on its façade. Just down the street is the Panaderia de Fornalutx (the local bakery), and on the road leading out of the town several restaurants. The old tower at the east side of the village is also used as the ajuntament (town hall), and just a few houses away from it is the public washing house. The latter has an open loggia at its front with a long bath of water (channelled here in open stone culverts alongside the roads coming down from the hills) and a rail above it where locals leave their clothes to be washed or to wash themselves.

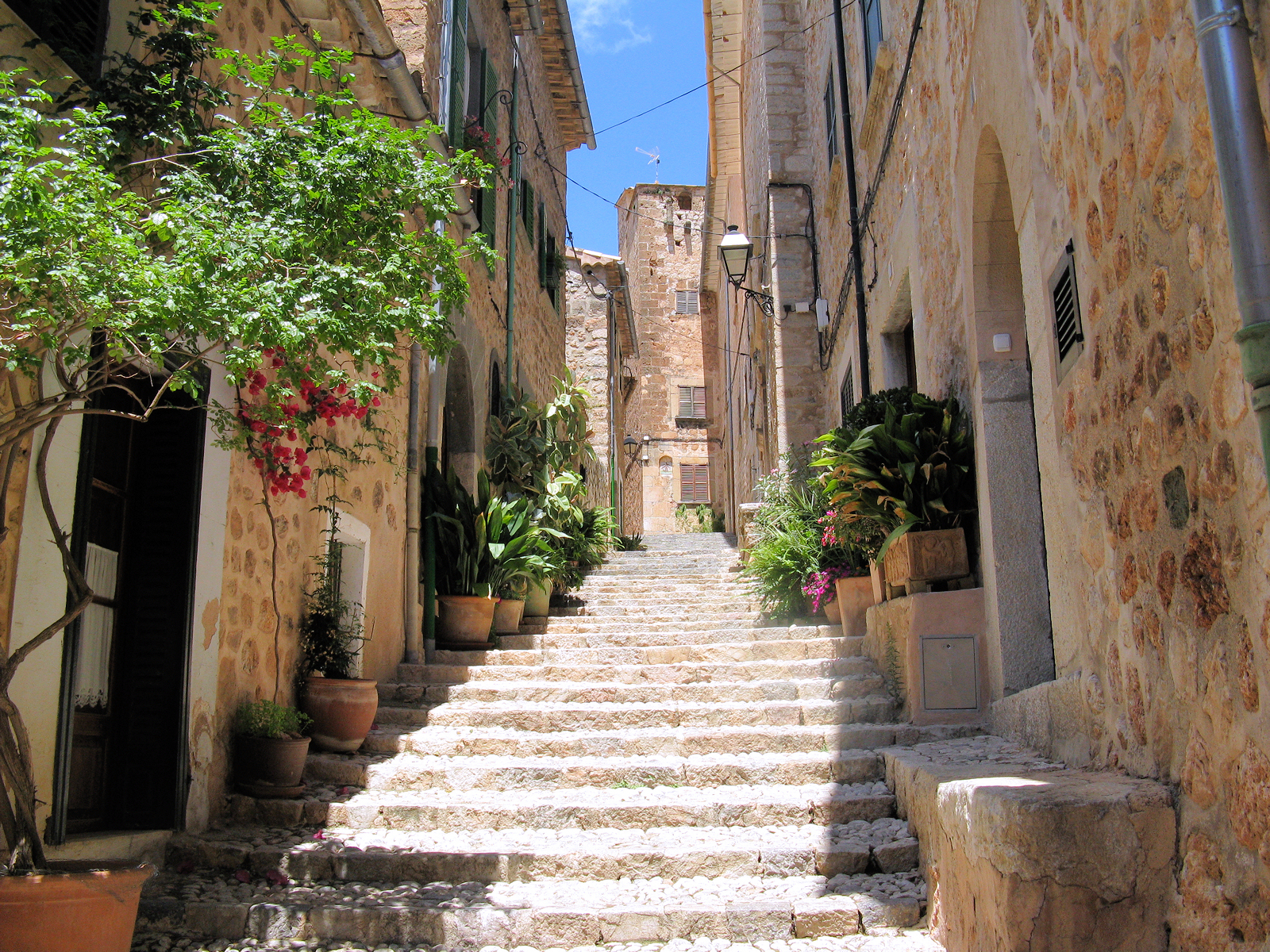
A street in Fornalutx

The architecture of the village is of stone and red roof tiles, with most buildings' windows also having green painted wooden shutters. The stone façades on the majority of these houses have been exposed in recent years by removing the original render to give the buildings a more rustic appearance than was originally the case. Built on different levels, many of the higher streets are pedestrianised and cobbled, with grassy paths leading off into the orchards and farms to the north.

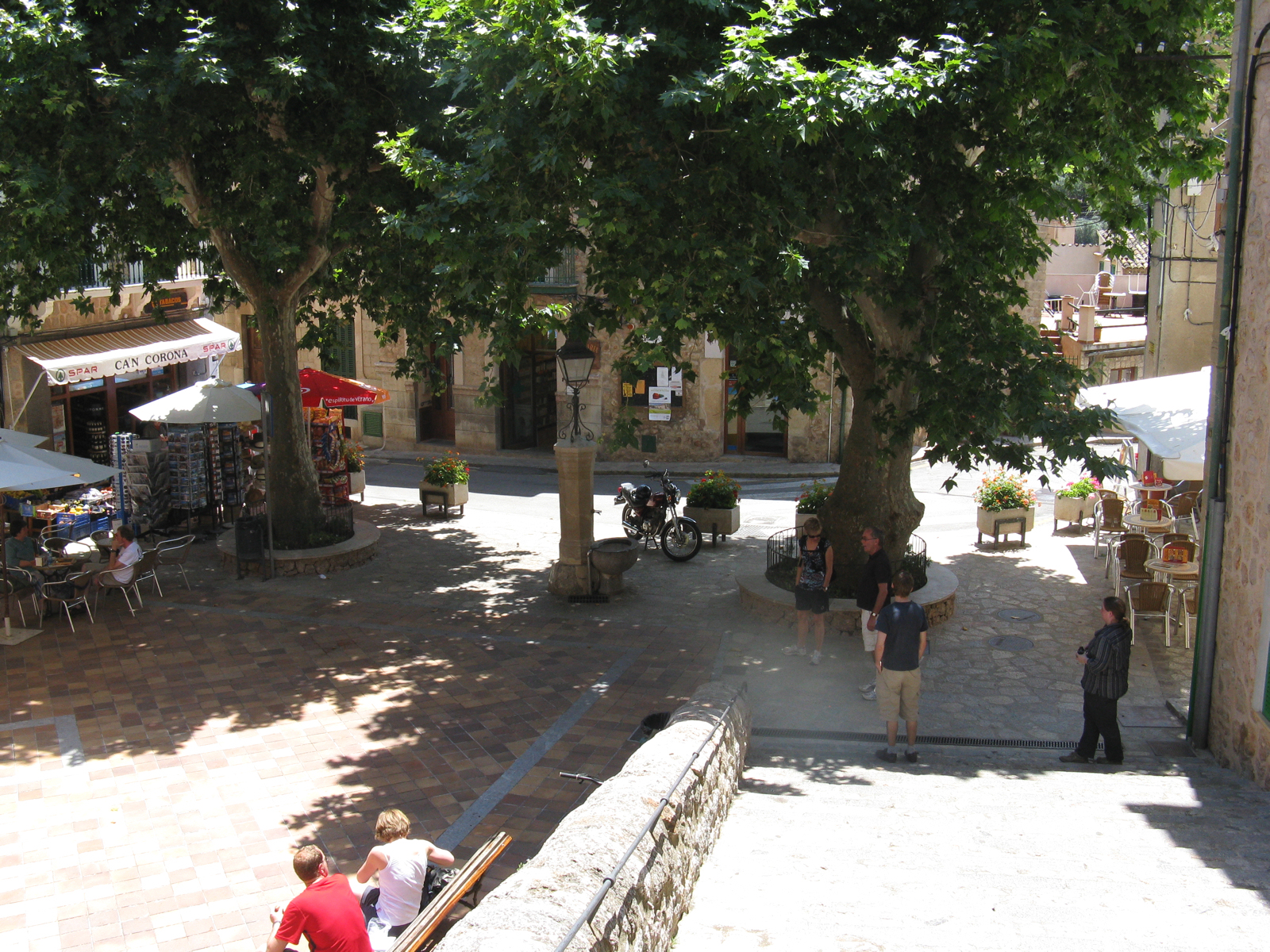
The village centre is Plaça d'Espanya

The dominant large plants in the area are orange trees, lemon trees and cacti. Thousands of house sparrows flit around the area and sheep graze in the surrounding orchards. Higher up, there are stunning olive groves with some trees more than a thousand years old.

Fornalutx has received prizes and recognition for tourism and conservation. In 1983 it was awarded the Mallorcan Tourism Board Silver Plaque for the defence and maintenance of the village. The same year the General Secretary for Tourism gave it the Second National Price for Towns embellished and maintained in Spain. In 1985 it received the Premi Alzina from the Grup Balear d'Ornitologia i Defensa de la Naturalesa.

The village is well supplied with public parking, there being three generous municipal car parks. Large vehicles are discouraged from passing through the centre by a weight limit and the need to negotiate a narrow bottleneck near the square. To help with this a turning place for lorries and coaches has been provided to the north.

There are a number of restaurants, bars, banks and shops.

A half hour a day free wireless internet access is provided by the town council in the main square.
