= Alfabia Mountains =

Mountain range in the Serra de Tramuntana mountains of Mallorca, Balearic Islands

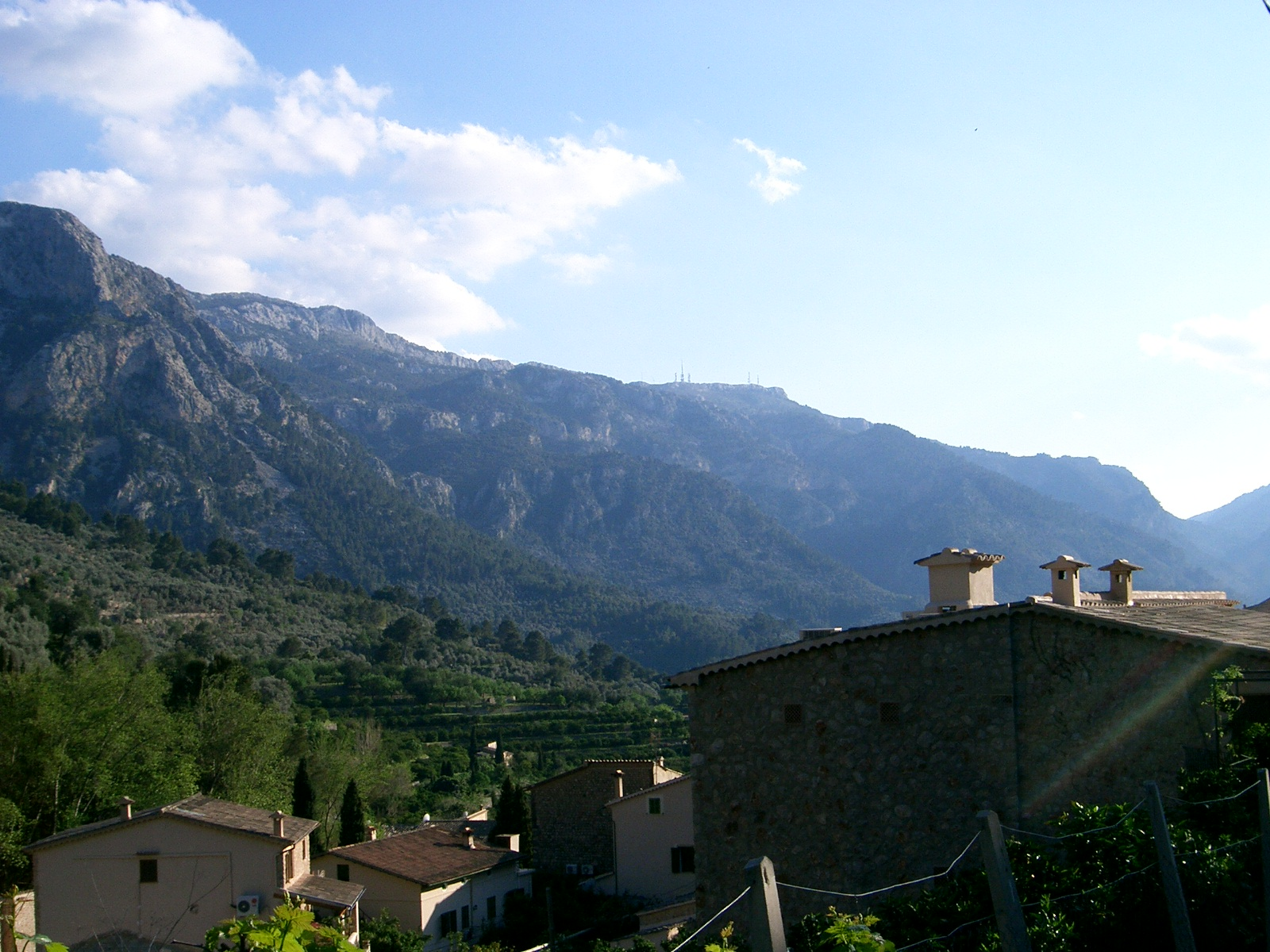

The Alfabia Mountains are a mountain range in Mallorca located in the municipality of Fornalutx.

Water from the Alfabia Mountains nourishes these unique gardens, showcasing a remarkable array of Renaissance and Baroque elements. Notable features include a cistern topped by a semi-circular vault, providing an excellent viewpoint to appreciate the vast landscape, and an expansive pergola adorned with giochi d'acqua (hidden water jets designed to surprise visitors) in traditional Renaissance fashion, leading to the orange grove. Additionally, a 19th-century section boasts a more organic design, complete with a quaint lake teeming with aquatic plants.

== Geography and climate ==
The Alfabia has a warm-summer mediterranean climate (Köppen: Csb; Trewartha: Dobk). Because the peak is 1,067 metres (3,501 ft) (the meteorological station is 1,030 metres (3,380 ft)), the climate is much cool compared to the coastal areas, and the precipitation is about twice the coastal areas.

Climate data for Sierra de Alfabia Climate ID: B248 / 08303; coordinates 39°44′06″N 02°42′47″W; elevation: 1,030 m (3,380 ft); 1991–2020 normals, extremes 1971–present
Month	Jan	Feb	Mar	Apr	May	Jun	Jul	Aug	Sep	Oct	Nov	Dec	Year
Record high °C (°F)	21.6 (70.9)	20.4 (68.7)	31.3 (88.3)	28.0 (82.4)	29.2 (84.6)	32.4 (90.3)	36.2 (97.2)	35.5 (95.9)	31.0 (87.8)	27.1 (80.8)	21.8 (71.2)	21.0 (69.8)	36.2 (97.2)
Mean daily maximum °C (°F)	8.0 (46.4)	8.9 (48.0)	10.9 (51.6)	13.4 (56.1)	17.4 (63.3)	22.4 (72.3)	25.2 (77.4)	25.2 (77.4)	20.0 (68.0)	16.4 (61.5)	11.5 (52.7)	9.1 (48.4)	15.7 (60.3)
Daily mean °C (°F)	5.8 (42.4)	6.3 (43.3)	8.0 (46.4)	10.4 (50.7)	14.1 (57.4)	19.0 (66.2)	21.6 (70.9)	21.6 (70.9)	17.0 (62.6)	13.8 (56.8)	9.3 (48.7)	6.8 (44.2)	12.8 (55.0)
Mean daily minimum °C (°F)	3.5 (38.3)	3.8 (38.8)	5.2 (41.4)	7.3 (45.1)	10.8 (51.4)	15.4 (59.7)	18.0 (64.4)	18.0 (64.4)	14.0 (57.2)	11.2 (52.2)	7.0 (44.6)	4.5 (40.1)	9.9 (49.8)
Record low °C (°F)	−7.9 (17.8)	−5.6 (21.9)	−5.0 (23.0)	−1.6 (29.1)	1.0 (33.8)	6.6 (43.9)	9.4 (48.9)	7.4 (45.3)	3.7 (38.7)	1.0 (33.8)	−2.8 (27.0)	−4.3 (24.3)	−7.9 (17.8)
Average precipitation mm (inches)	85.7 (3.37)	60.8 (2.39)	56.5 (2.22)	84.8 (3.34)	51.9 (2.04)	18.7 (0.74)	6.6 (0.26)	22.9 (0.90)	64.9 (2.56)	87.8 (3.46)	107.3 (4.22)	93.8 (3.69)	741.8 (29.20)
Average precipitation days (≥ 0.1 mm)	10.64	10.23	10.20	10.14	7.13	3.80	2.30	3.22	10.60	11.17	12.20	11.44	103.07
Average relative humidity (%)	75	72	69	65	62	56	55	57	72	77	78	79	68
Source: State Meteorological Agency/AEMET OpenData
