= Gregorio Bausá =

Spanish painter

Gregorio Bausá (1590–1656) was a Spanish painter of the Baroque period.

Born in the island of Mallorca in the village of Sóller to Juan Bausá, he was baptized on August 23 the same year. He was a nephew of Simón Bausá Sales who became bishop of Mallorca in 1607. He was the pupil of Francisco Ribalta, and painted devotional paintings. He died in Valencia.
