= Cercle Solleric =

Library in Spain

- Abbreviation: Es Círcul, es Centro
- Formation: March 25, 1899; 127 years ago
- Purpose: Sport and culture
- Headquarters: Sóller, Majorca, Spain
- Location(s): Plaça Constitució, 17; 07100 Sóller, Majorca; Balearic Islands; Spain
- Coordinates: 39.7661°N 2.7156°E
- President: Jaume A. Aguiló Morales
- Secretary: Francesc Rullan
- Affiliations: 580 (2015)
- Website: www.circulosollerense.com

The Cercle Solleric (in Spanish Círculo Sollerense) is a sporting and cultural association. It was founded in 1899 in Sóller (Majorca, Balearic Islands, Spain).

== Facility ==
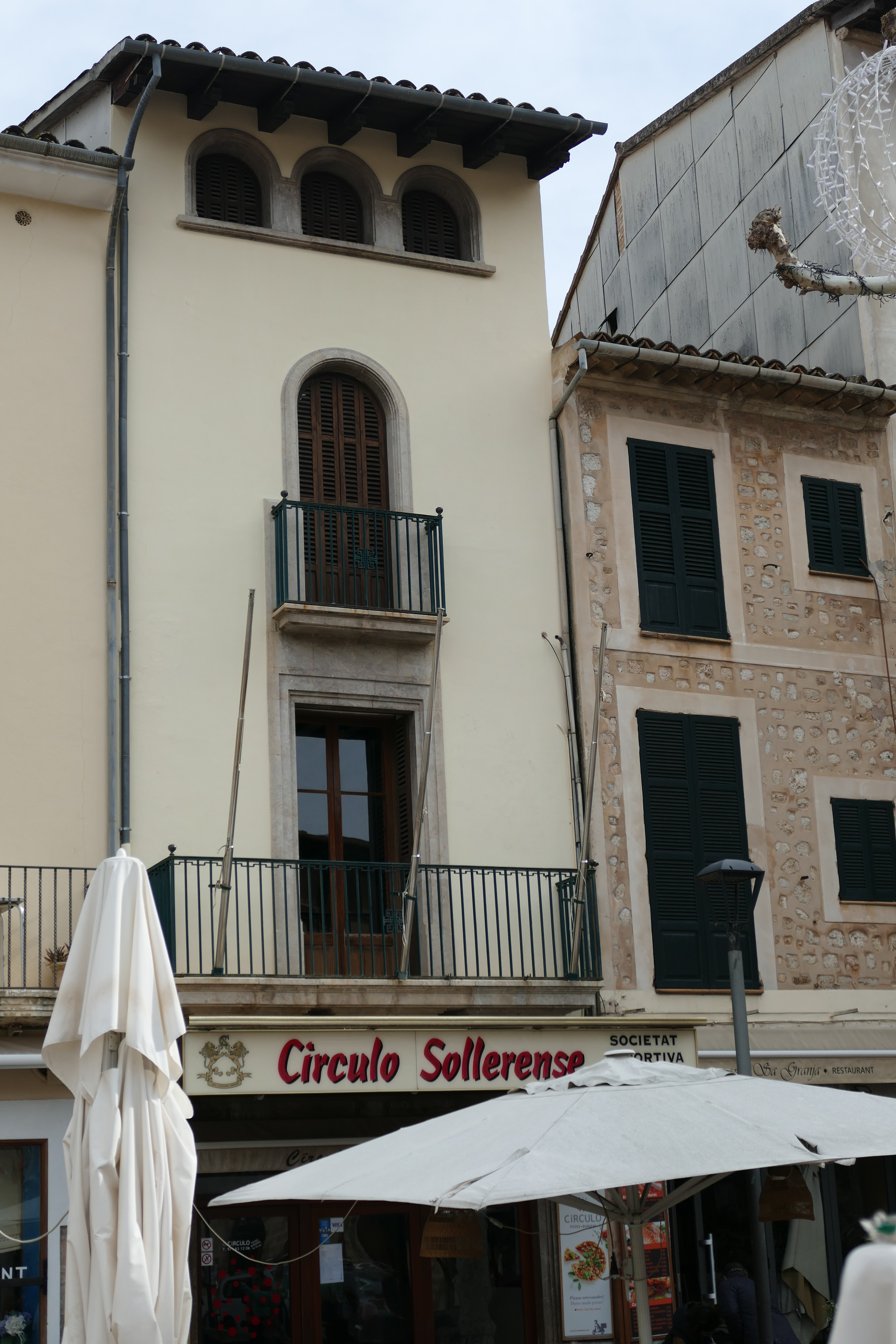
- The building of the Cercle Solleric on the Plaça de la Constitució in Sóller
  Ground floor: cafe and restaurant
- First floor: library room, card playing room
- Second floor: cinema and television room, carom billiards room
- Third floor: chess room

== Sport sections ==
- Athletics
- Chess
- Women's football
- Futsal
- Mountain climbing and hiking
