= Els Cornadors =

Mountain range in Mallorca, Spain

Coordinates: 39.760°N 2.744°E

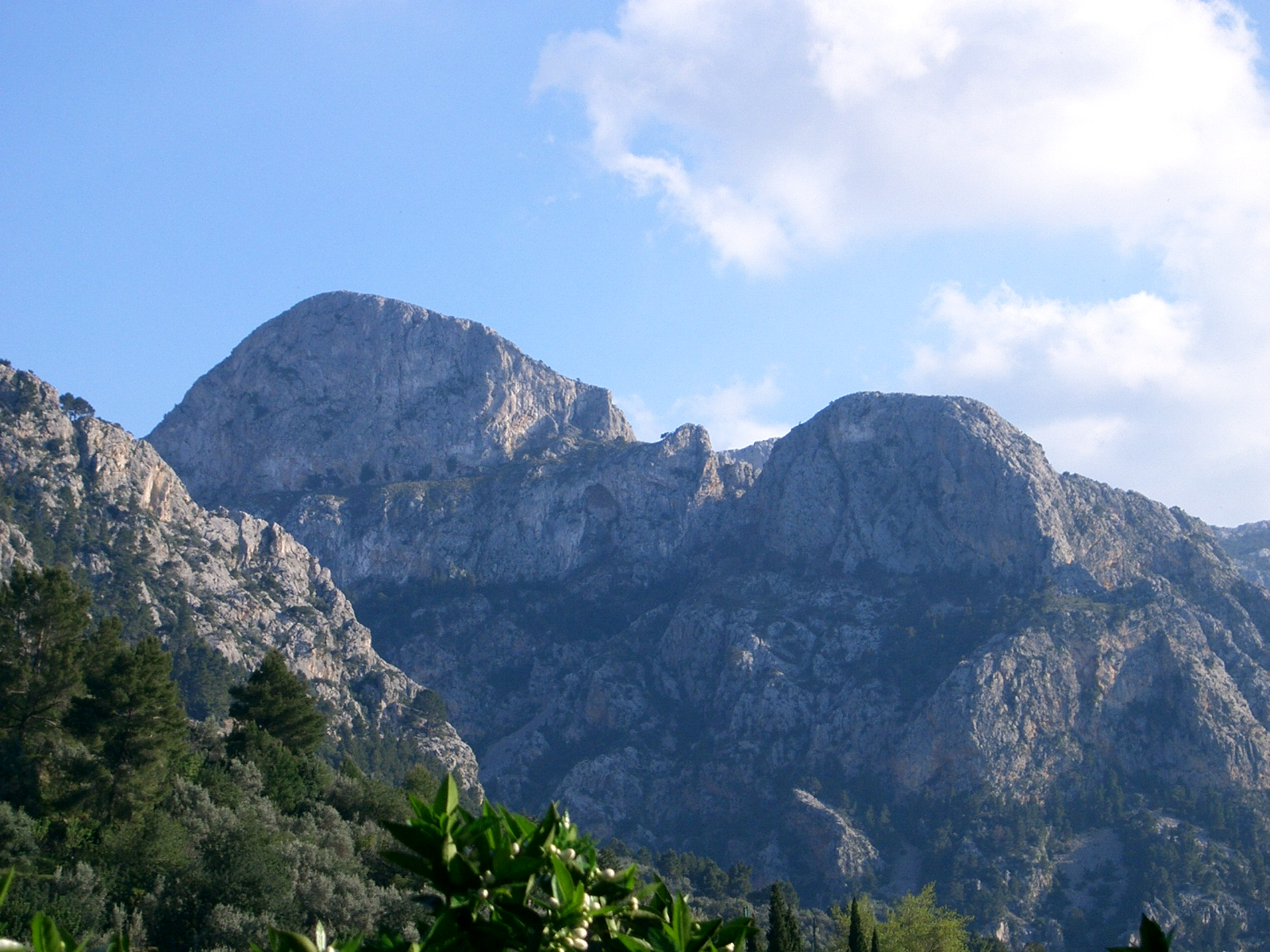
Els Cornadors

Els Cornadors(953m/3 127ft a.s.l.) is a mountain range in Mallorca in the municipality of Sóller.
