= Maley & Taunton =

UK business

- Industry: Rail transport
- Founded: 1926; 100 years ago
- Defunct: 1968
- Fate: Defunct
- Headquarters: Wednesbury, England, UK
- Area served: Worldwide
- Key people: Alfred Walter Maley; Edmund MacKenzie Taunton
- Products: Trams; Tram brakes, motors, trucks, etc.

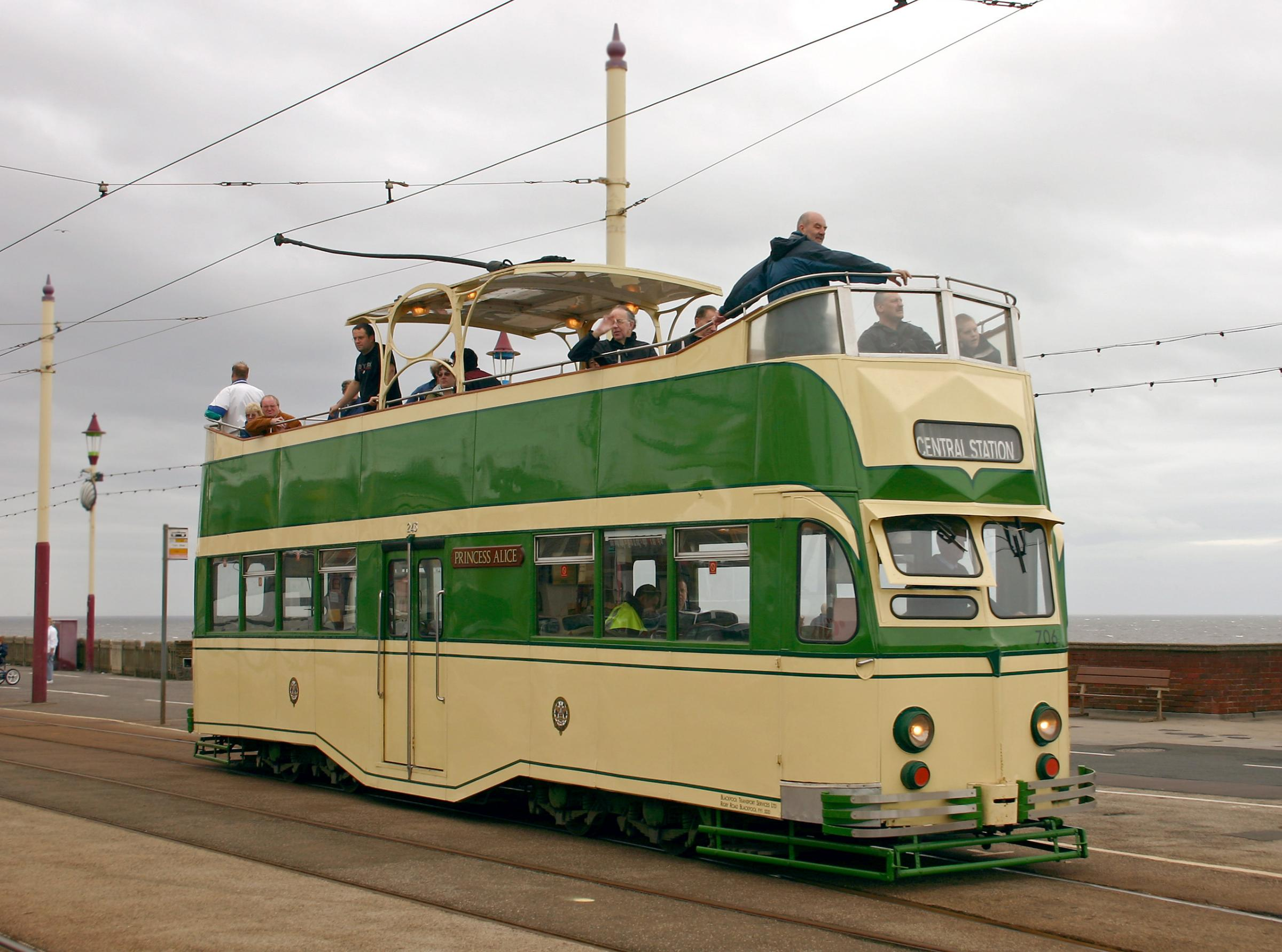
Open-topped Balloon tram 706 "Princess Alice" at Bispham, running on English Electric trucks.

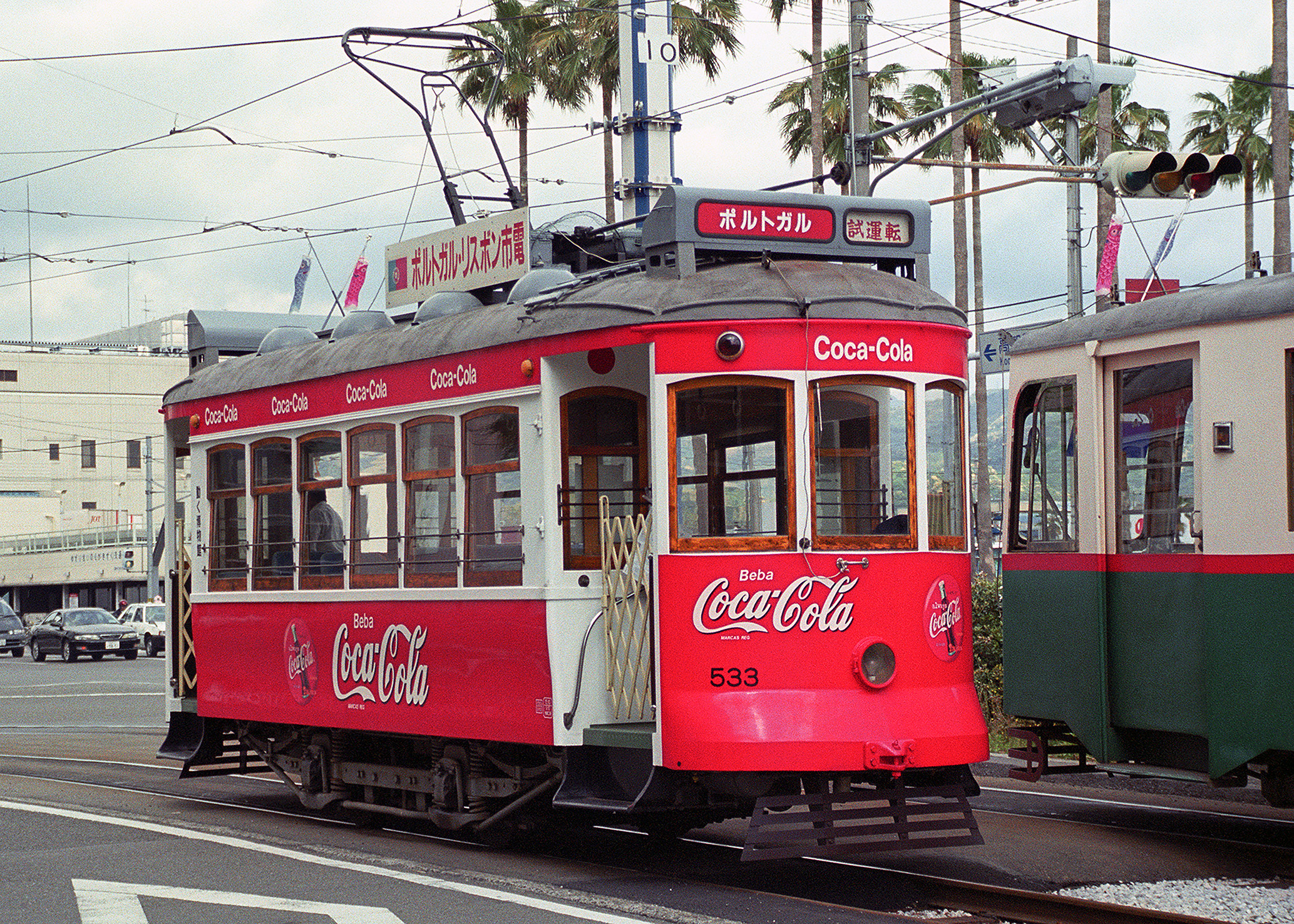
Former CCFL 533, built in 1928 on a Maley & Taunton truck: in heritage operation in Kochi, 1984-2009

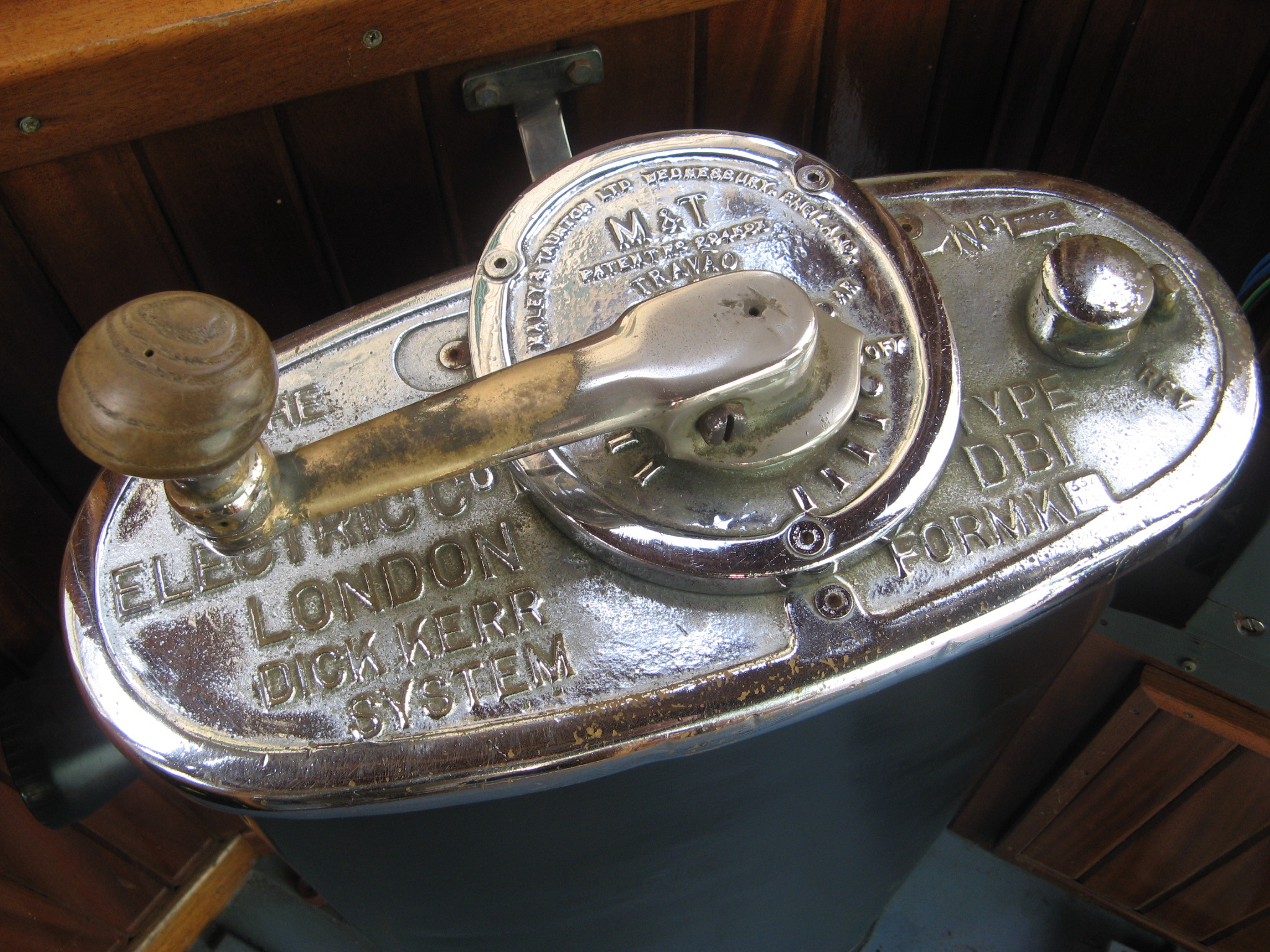
Cast metal faceplate with manufacturer's name and controller settings

Maley & Taunton was a tram and tramway engineering company. It was situated in Wednesbury in Staffordshire, England. The principals, Alfred Walter Maley (1880-1947) and Edmund MacKenzie Taunton (1884-1957) held patents for tram and tramway machinery and equipment. The company exported globally, with its tram trucks used, among others, in Lisbon, Johannesburg, and Hong Kong, and locally – to the Blackpool tramway, Sheffield Corporation, Liverpool Corporation, Glasgow Corporation, and the Manx Electric Railway.

== See also ==
- List of tram builders
